= Pankhurst =

Pankhurst is a surname, and may refer to:

Members of a prominent family of suffragettes:

- Emmeline Pankhurst (1858–1928), one of the founders of the British suffragette movement.
- Richard Pankhurst (1834–1898), member of the Independent Labour Party, and husband of Emmeline.
- Christabel Pankhurst (1880–1958), suffragette and daughter of Emmeline and Richard.
- Adela Pankhurst (1886–1961), suffragette and political activist who moved to Australia. Daughter of Emmeline and Richard.
- Sylvia Pankhurst (1882–1960), suffragette, artist, and political activist. Daughter of Emmeline and Richard.
- Richard K.P. Pankhurst (1927–2017), Ethiopian scholar and son of Sylvia.
- Rita Pankhurst (1927–2019), linguist, reporter and librarian who married into the Pankhurst family.
- Alula Pankhurst, Ethiopian scholar and son of Richard K.P. and Rita.
- Helen Pankhurst, activist and writer and daughter of Richard K.P. and Rita.

Other:

- Henry Pankhurst, a British runner who competed in the 1908 Summer Olympics
- Kate Pankhurst, British illustrator and writer
- Robert John Pankhurst, a British geologist
