= Pankhurst Centre =

Victorian villas in Manchester, England

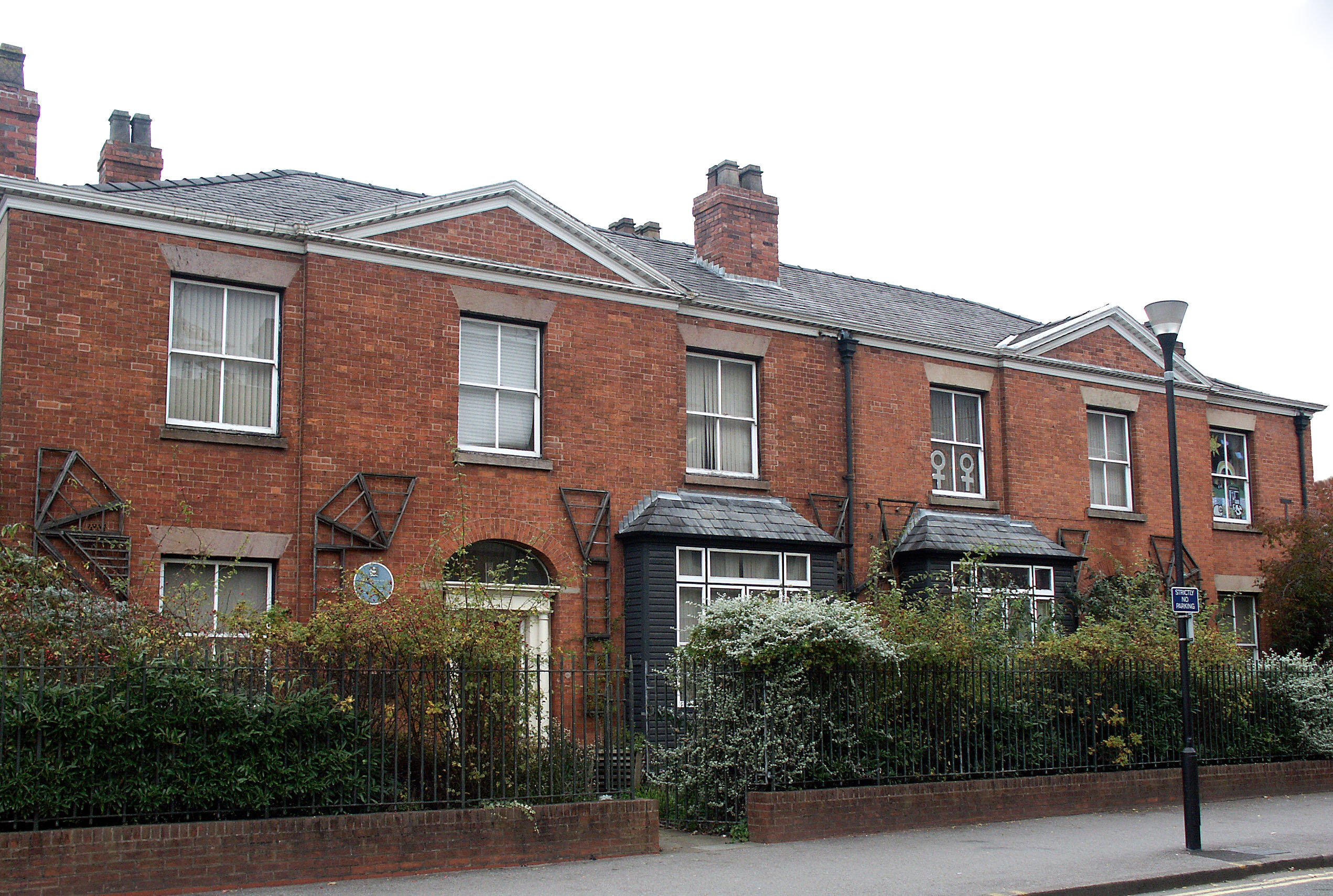
- The Pankhurst Centre
- Interactive map of the Pankhurst Centre area

General information
- Architectural style: Edwardian
- Location: Nelson Street, Manchester, England
- Coordinates: 53°27′47″N 2°13′39″W
- Year built: c. 1840

Design and construction
- Designations

Listed Building – Grade II*
- Official name: The Pankhurst Centre
- Designated: 9 June 1974
- Reference no.: 1197896

Website
- www.pankhursttrust.org

The Pankhurst Centre (also known as The Pankhurst Museum) at 60–62 Nelson Street in Manchester, England, comprises a pair of Victorian villas, of which No. 62 was the home of Emmeline Pankhurst and her daughters Sylvia, Christabel and Adela and the birthplace of the suffragette movement in 1903. The Pankhurst Centre is home to the Pankhurst Trust. The building is currently used as a museum, as well as being the headquarters of Manchester Women's Aid.

== History ==
62 Nelson Street was constructed around 1840 and was the home of Emmeline Pankhurst at the time she founded the Women's Social and Political Union in 1903. She moved there after the death of her husband, Richard Pankhurst, in 1898.

On 9 June 1974, the site became a Grade II* listed building. In 1978 there was an application submitted to demolish the building, sparking a notable protest to keep the building as a museum and centre committed to women's issues.

The parlour was the first room in the Pankhurst Centre to be redecorated and was the centre of attraction when Barbara Castle and Helen Pankhurst opened the centre on 10 October 1987.

The centre would merge with Manchester Women's Aid in 2014 to offer women's charity services.

The Representation of the People Act 1918 gave the vote to all men aged 21 and over and women aged 30 and over who met certain property qualifications. In its centenary year of 2018, calls were made to fund the Pankhurst Centre to make it a major museum that tells the story of women's suffrage and the women's rights movement.

The Pankhurst Centre suffered a break-in on 1 October 2019. Since then, donations have been made to repair the damage, including £10,000 from The Co-operative Group.

The centre reopened on 29 August 2021 after a major redevelopment project in the two galleries and the parlour during 2020.

== Description ==
The Pankhurst's villas provide a women-only space drop-in every Wednesday from 12pm to 2pm which creates an environment for women to learn together, work on projects and socialise.

Part of the centre is a museum, The Pankhurst Parlour, which has become a memorial to the suffragette movement. Its Edwardian style furnishings evoke the home of Pankhurst and her daughters. It is the only museum dedicated to telling the story of women's fight for the right to vote.

The Pankhurst Centre is run by volunteers and receives no public funding, relying solely on donations.

== Pankhurst Centre Garden ==
In September 2018, a newly designed garden by Janet Leigh (a garden designer based in Stockport), was opened at the Pankhurst Centre. The garden marks the centenary of Votes for Women, and acknowledges the work of suffragettes. The garden was funded by an outsourcing campaign, with over 500 people contributing over £24,000 in 2017. The garden also provides a relaxation space for the women and children residents of Manchester Women's Aid.

== Gallery ==
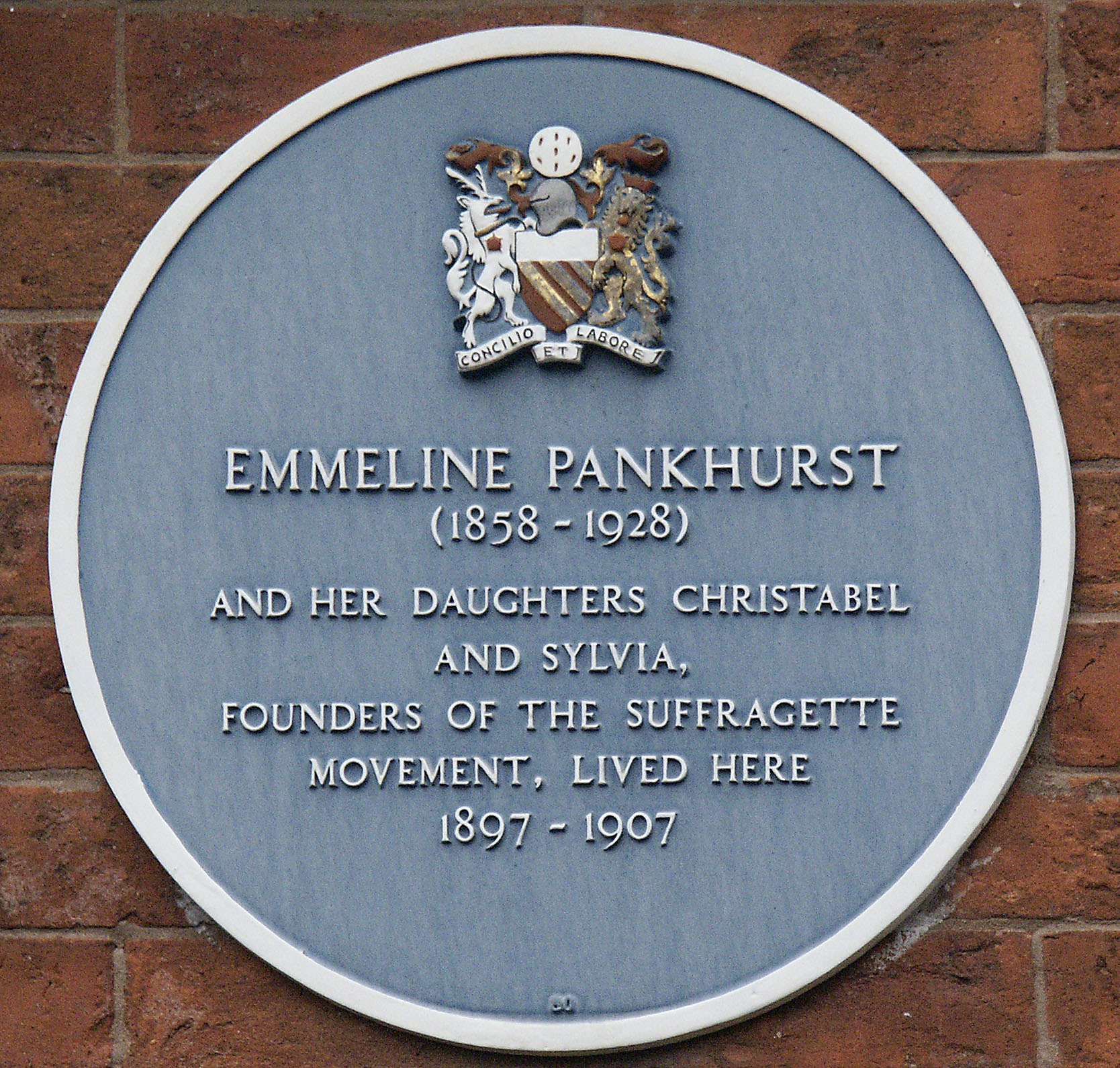
Blue plaque on the wall of The Pankhurst Centre

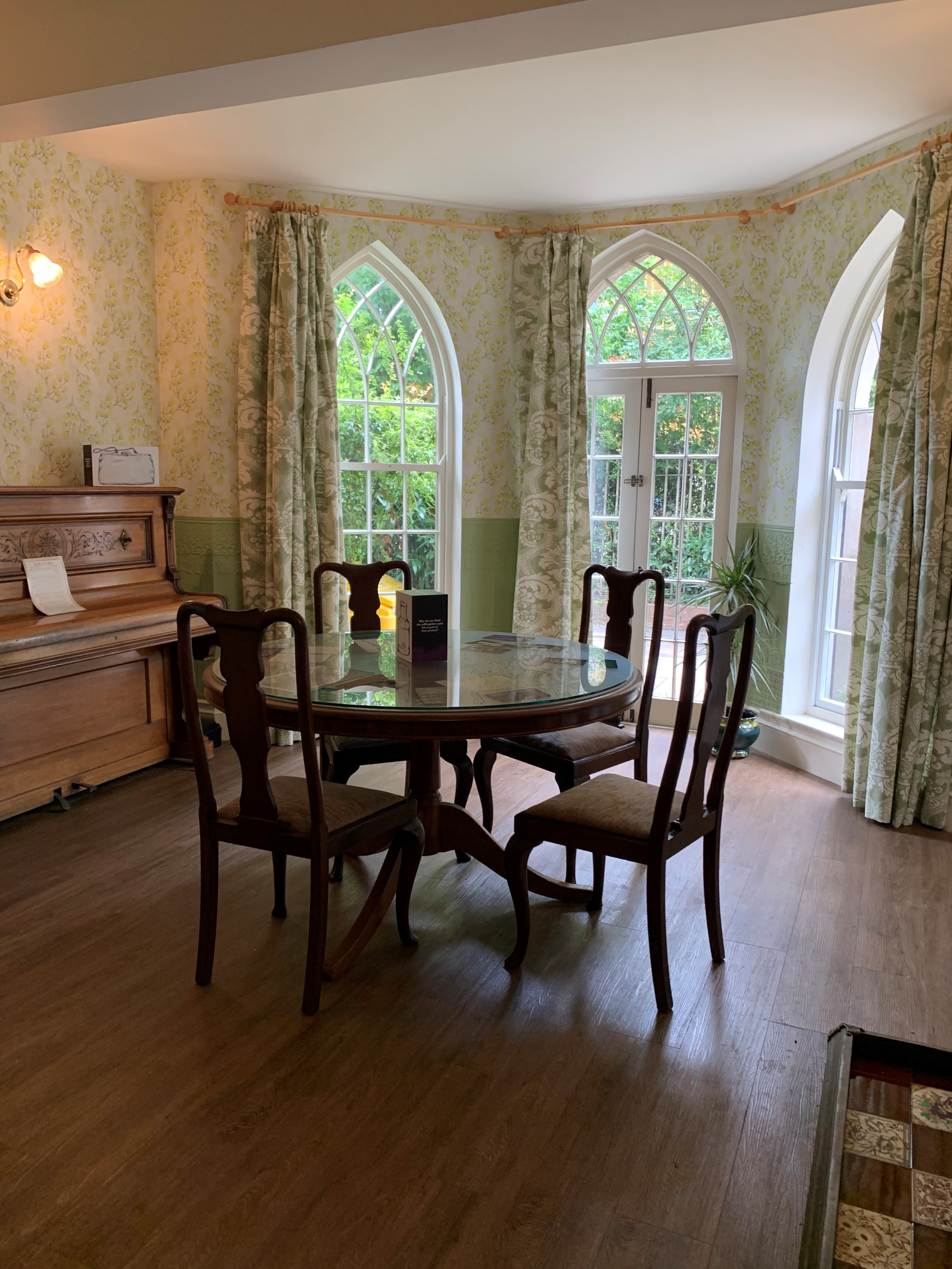
Pankhurst Centre, interior

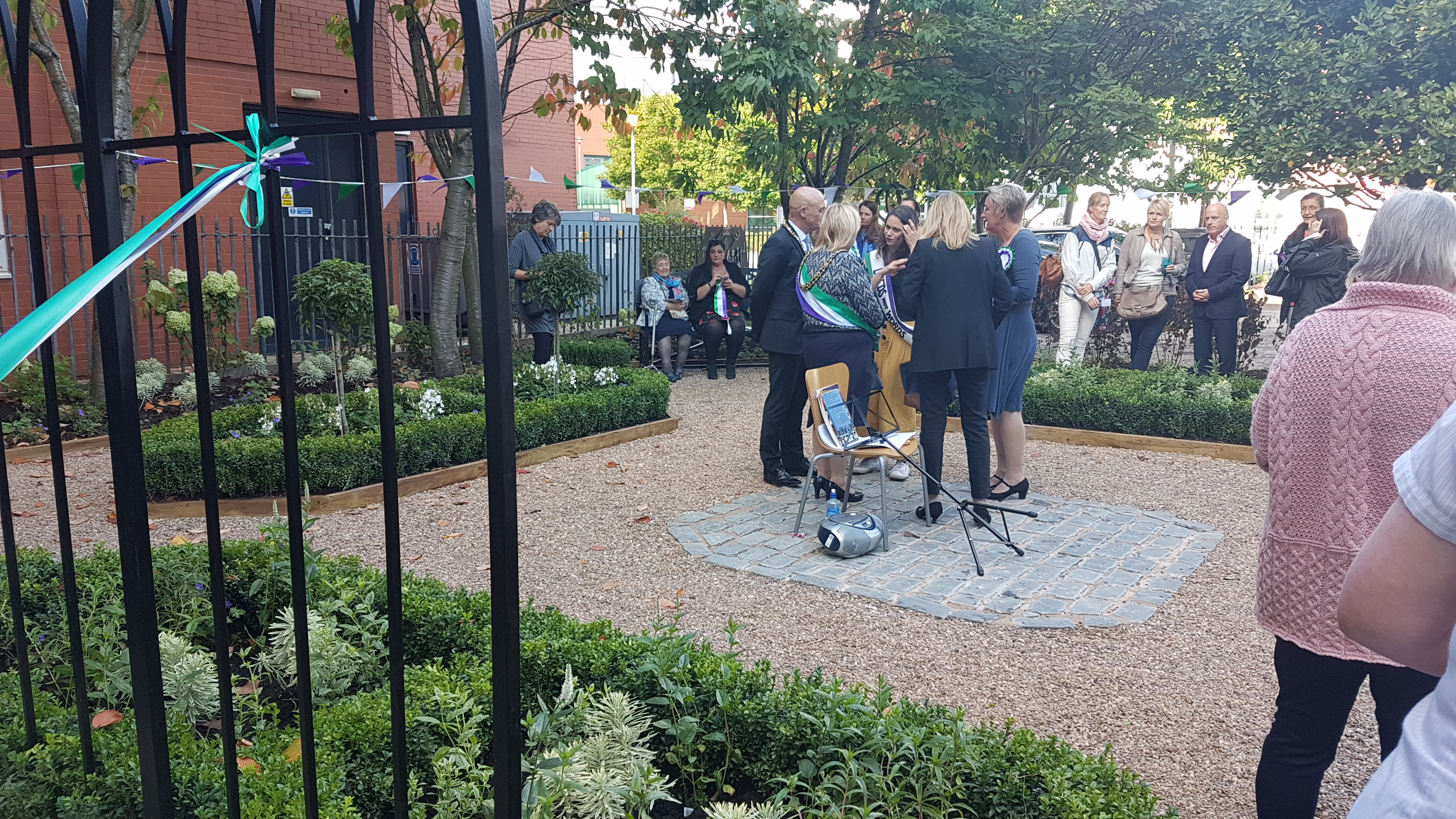
Opening of Pankhurst Centre Garden, September 2018

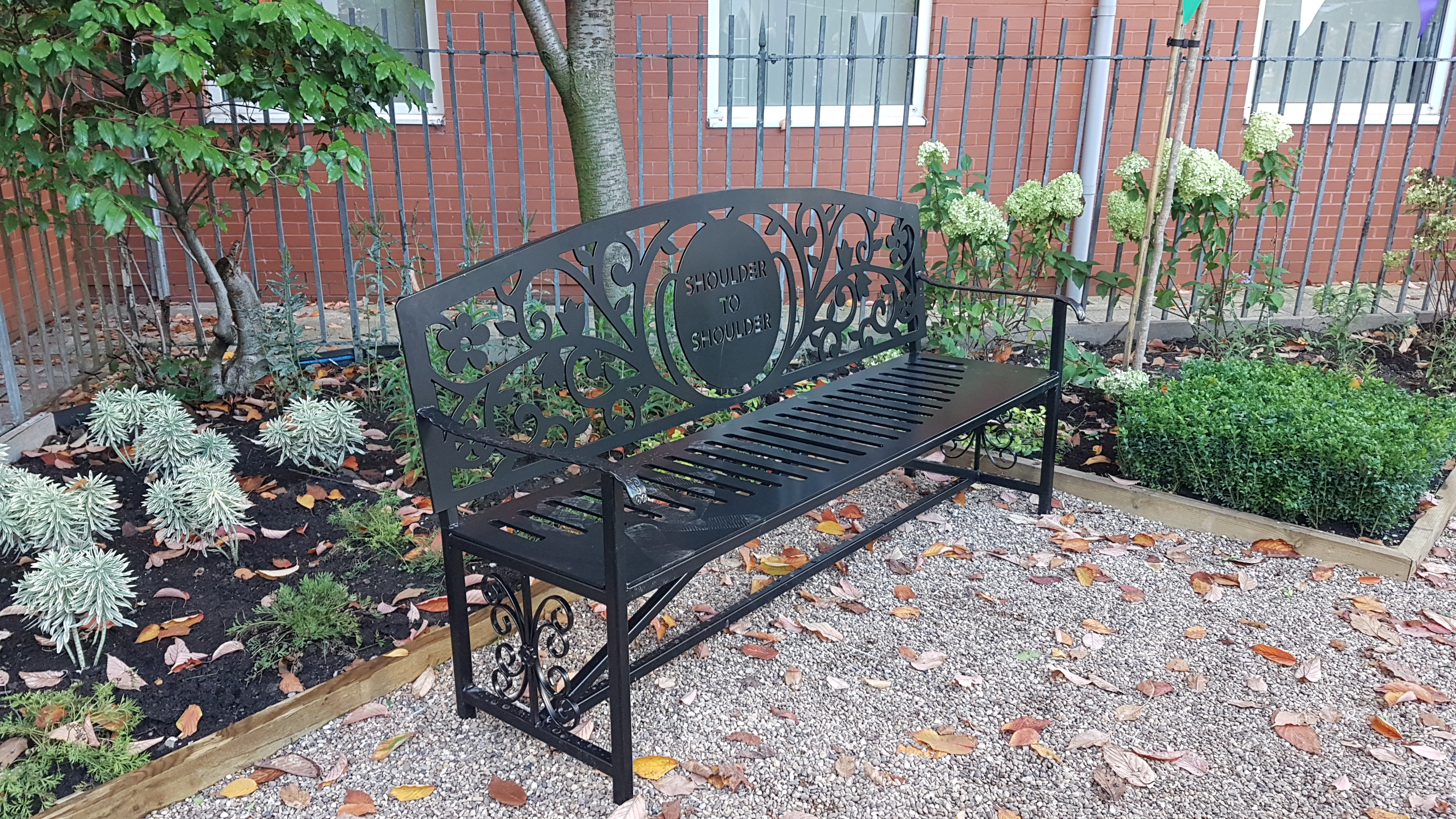
Bench, Pankhurst Centre Garden

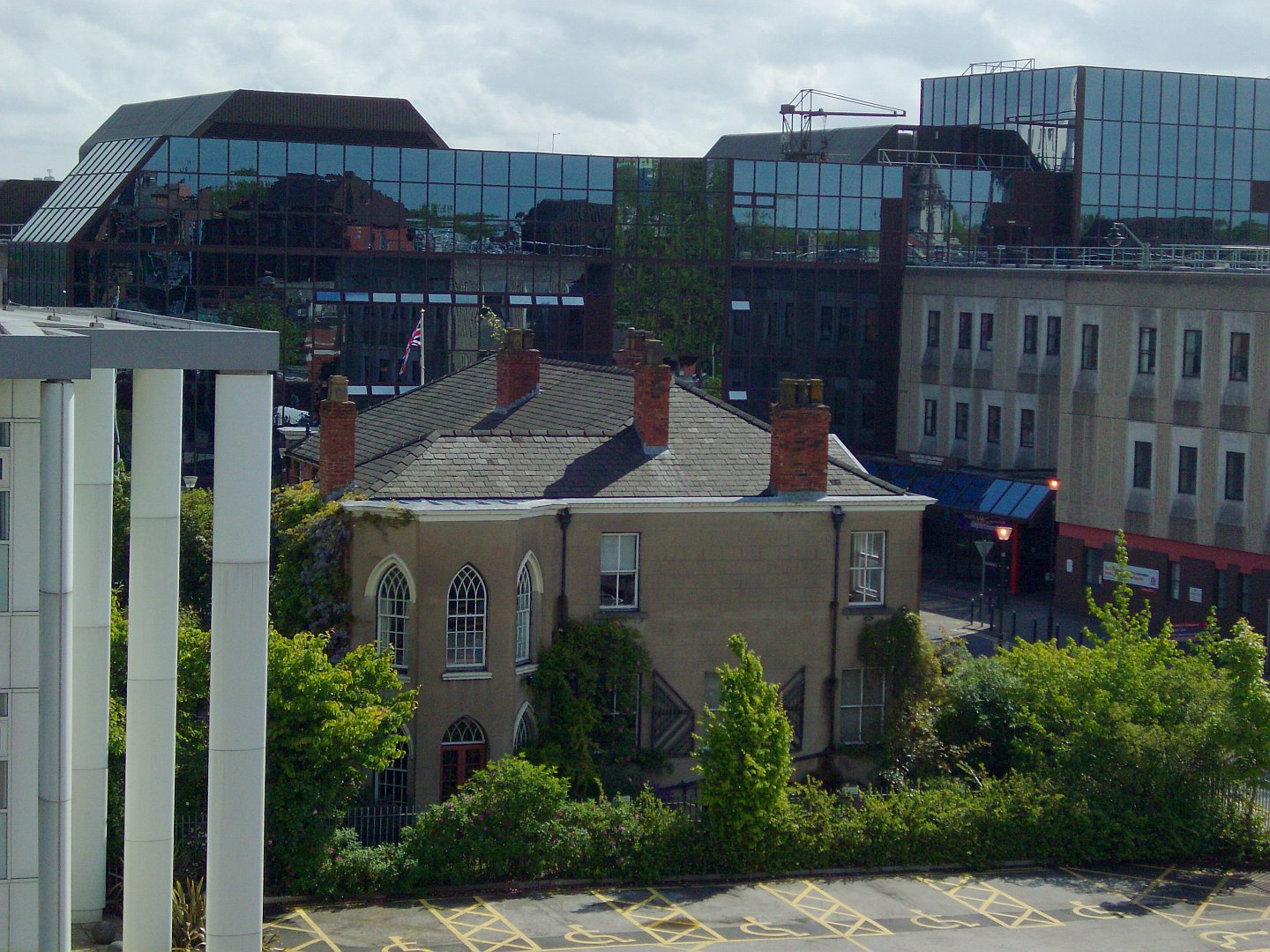
The Pankhurst Centre as seen from the Manchester Royal Infirmary car park

== See also ==
- Grade II* listed buildings in Greater Manchester
- List of monuments and memorials to women's suffrage
- Listed buildings in Manchester-M13
