= Adela Pankhurst =

British-Australian suffragette and political activist (1885–1961)

Adela Walsh
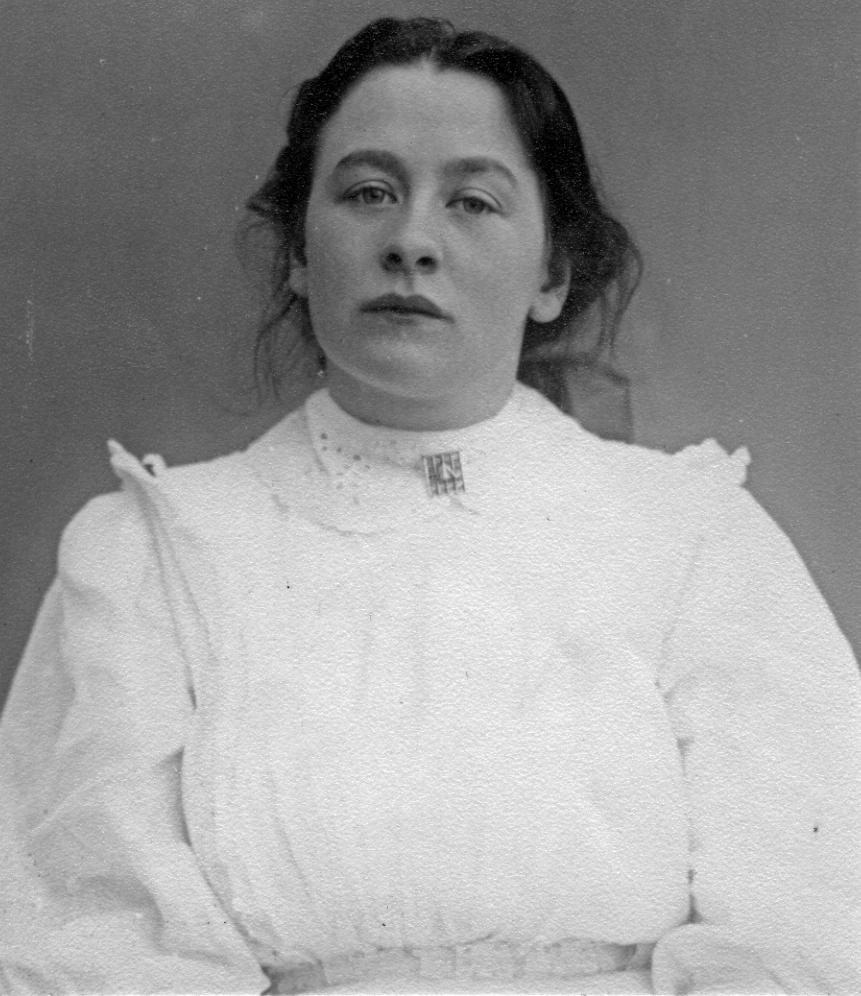
- Adela at the Suffragette's Rest
- Born: Adela Constantia Mary Pankhurst; 19 June 1885; Chorlton upon Medlock, Lancashire, England
- Died: 23 May 1961 (aged 75); Wahroonga, New South Wales, Australia
- Citizenship: Australian
- Education: Studley Horticultural College; Manchester High School for Girls
- Occupations: Suffragette and political organiser
- Organization(s): Women's Social and Political Union (WSPU); Australia First Movement; Australian Women's Guild of Empire
- Political party: Independent Labour Party; Communist Party of Australia
- Spouse: Thomas Walsh (m. 1917; died 1943)
- Children: 5
- Parent(s): Richard Pankhurst; Emmeline Goulden
- Relatives: Christabel Pankhurst (sister); Sylvia Pankhurst (sister); Richard Pankhurst (nephew); Helen Pankhurst (great-niece); Alula Pankhurst (great-nephew)

Adela Constantia Mary Walsh (née Pankhurst /.pæŋkhərst/; 19 June 1885 – 23 May 1961) was a British-born suffragette who worked as a political organiser for the Women's Social and Political Union (WSPU) in Scotland. In 1914, she moved to Australia, where she continued her activism and was co-founder of both the Communist Party of Australia and the Australia First Movement.

== Early life ==
Pankhurst was born on 19 June 1885 in Chorlton upon Medlock, Manchester, Lancashire, England, into a politicised family: her father, Richard Pankhurst, was a socialist and candidate for Parliament, and her mother, Emmeline Pankhurst (née Goulden), and sisters, Sylvia Pankhurst and Christabel Pankhurst, were leaders of the British suffragette movement. She was the youngest of the Pankhurst children. Her mother was of Manx descent.

Pankhurst attended the all-woman Studley Horticultural College near Studley in Warwickshire then Manchester High School for Girls. She also attended a period of teaching training, but did not complete the course. After finishing her education, she accompanied Helen Archdale to Italy.

== UK ==
As a teenager, Pankhurst became involved in the militant Women's Social and Political Union (WSPU), which had been founded by her mother and sisters in 1903.

In June 1906, Pankhurst disrupted a Liberal Party meeting and was sentenced to seven days in prison. Later that year, she was part of a group who entered the House of Commons, wishing to speak with members. Nine women were arrested, including Emmeline Pethick-Lawrence, Anne Cobden-Sanderson, Charlotte Despard, Teresa Billington-Greig, Mary Gawthorpe, Dora Montefiore. Pankhurst and Jessie Kenney formed The Young Hot Bloods in 1907, which was an inner secret branch of the suffragettes involved in "danger duty". She was "recklessly dedicated" to the suffrage movement.

Pankhurst was active in Scarborough, North Yorkshire, from 1908 and protested during the visit of Sir Edward Grey, Foreign Secretary for the Liberal government, who was giving a talk at the Scarborough Liberal Association. She worked with Marion Mackenzie to build a local WSPU branch in Scarborough, and gave talks in York organised by the local WSPU branch secretary Annie Coultate.

In November 1909 Pankhurst joined a protest that interrupted a talk by Winston Churchill at his constituency in Dundee, Scotland. She was arrested for "breaking the peace", along with Helen Archdale, Catherine Corbett and Maud Joachim. Pankhurst had slapped a policeman who was trying to evict her from the building. Although she went on hunger strike there, she was not force-fed as prison governor and medical supervisor assessed her "heart's action as violent and laboured".

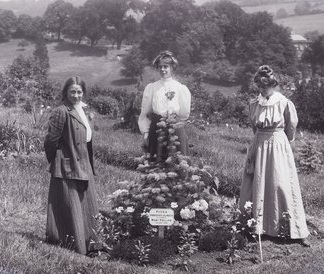
Pankhurst, Jessie and Annie Kenney at Eagle House in 1910

Eagle House near Bath in Somerset had become an important refuge for suffragettes who had been released from prison. Mary Blathwayt's parents planted trees there between April 1909 and July 1911 to commemorate the achievements of suffragettes including Pankhurst's mother and sister, Christabel as well as Annie Kenney, Charlotte Despard, Millicent Fawcett and Lady Lytton. The trees were known as "Annie's Arboreatum" after Annie Kenney. There was also a "Pankhurst Pond" within the grounds. Pankhurst was invited to Eagle House in 1909 and 1910. She planted a Himalayan cedar on 3 July 1910. A plaque was made and her photograph was recorded again by Colonel Linley Blathwayt.

Her mother's favourite child was Christabel and the two of them took the Women's Social and Political Union as their own organisation. They fell out with many of their leading volunteers and supporters and this included Sylvia Pankhurst and Adela Pankhurst. Both of the latter believed in socialism whereas Emmeline and Christabel were pushing for the vote for middle-class women. Sylvia was ejected from the party and she set up her own splinter group in east London. Christabel is reported to have said to Sylvia: "I would not care if you were multiplied by a hundred, but one of Adela is too many." Pankhurst was given £20, a ticket to Australia and a letter introducing her to Australian suffragist and social reformer Vida Goldstein. Pankhurst was among the first group of suffragettes to go on hunger strike when in prison. She was being targeted by the police, as a high-profile activist. Pankhurst was given a Hunger Strike Medal 'for Valour' by the WSPU.

== Australia ==
Pankhurst emigrated to Australia in 1914 following a falling out with her family, estrangement from them and frequent incarceration. She sailed from Southampton to Melbourne aboard the Geelong.

Pankhurst's experience of activism enabled her to be recruited during World War I as an organiser for the Women's Peace Army in Melbourne by Goldstein. Pankhurst wrote a pacifist booklet called Put Up the Sword (1915), penned a number of anti-war pamphlets, and addressed public meetings, speaking against war and conscription. In 1915, With Cecilia John from the Women's Peace Army, she toured Australia, establishing branches of the Women's Peace Army. In 1916 she travelled through New Zealand addressing large crowds, and again toured New South Wales and Queensland arguing the importance of feminist opposition to militarism. On 8 March 1917, her mother Emmeline sent an angry telegram to the Australian Prime Minister, Billy Hughes, in which she condemned her daughter for her opposition to conscription and the war effort, saying that: "I am ashamed of Adela and repudiate her."

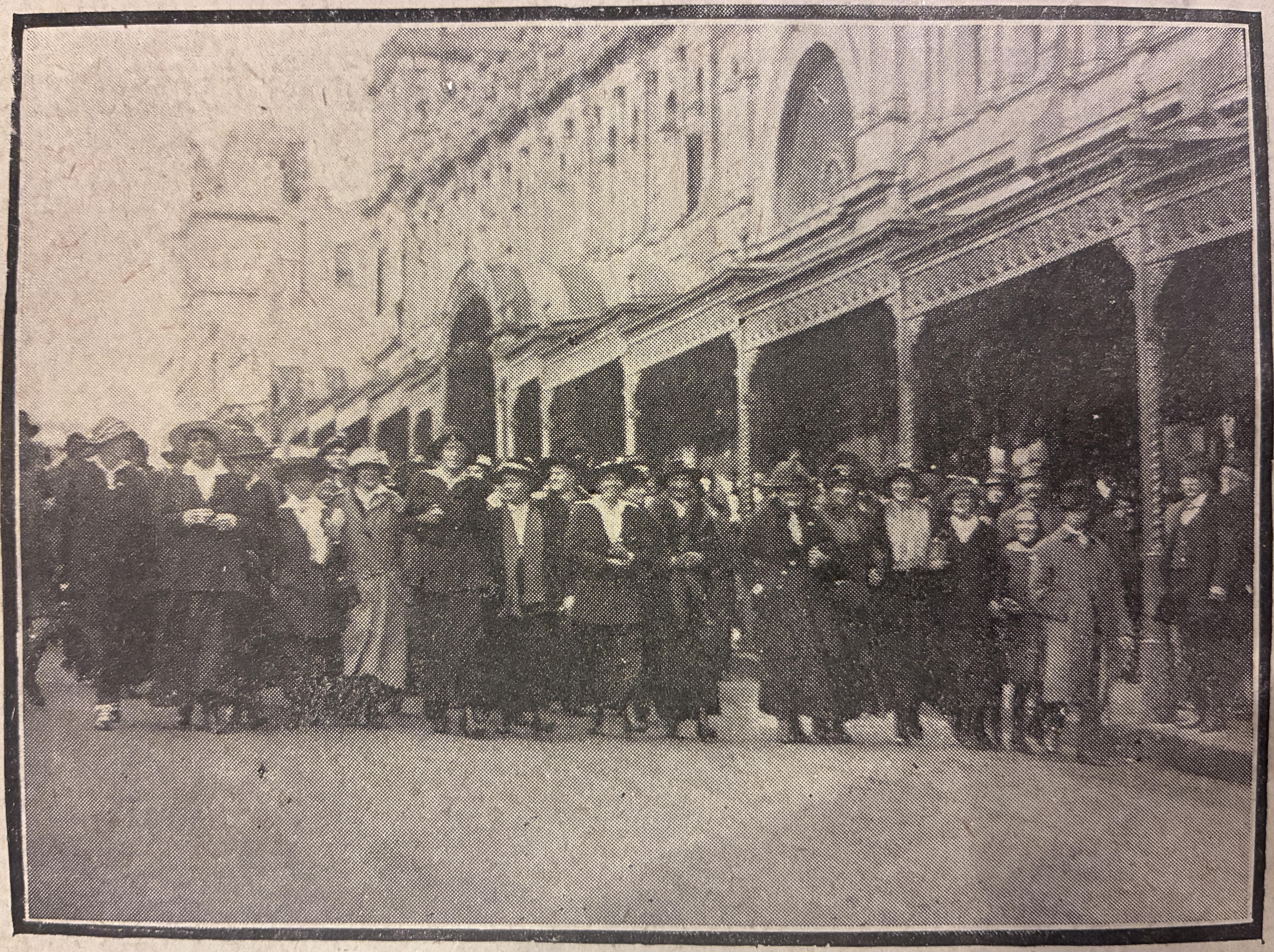
Pankhurst leading the women's protest in Melbourne against rising food prices on 23 August 1917, from The Sydney Mail, 29 August 1917

On 23 August 1917, Pankhurst spearheaded a women's protest in Melbourne against rising food prices. She was arrested for her involvement in the protest but was released on bail until her trial. She was at risk of deportation back to Britain. During this period of remand, she married her husband, trade unionist Tom Walsh. Reverend Fredrick Sinclaire of the Free Religious Fellowship married the couple on 30 September 1917 in Melbourne, with Robert Ross, editor of The Socialist, as best man. Prime Minister Hughes offered to commute her sentence under the condition that she never gave a speech again. Pankhurst refused Hughes' terms and only weeks after being married returned to jail to serve her four-month sentence. A petition was signed by other suffragettes advocating on behalf of her release, but it was ineffective and she served her full sentence.

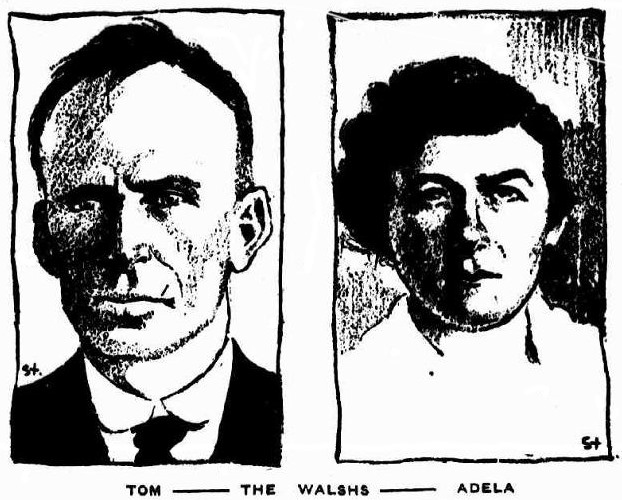
Drawing of The Walshs, Smith's Weekly, 22 April 1922

Upon being released in January 1918, the Walsh family moved from Melbourne to Sydney. In Sydney, Adela gave birth to their son and four daughters: Richard (born 1918), Sylvia (born 1920), Christian (born 1921), Ursula (born 1923), and Faith (born and died 1926). Her husband had three daughters from his previous marriage. In 1920, Pankhurst and her husband became founding members of the Communist Party of Australia, from which she was later expelled. Pankhurst also wrote for the Seamen's Journal (the publication of the Seamen's Union of Australia) and organised for the Social Democratic League.

Pankhurst became disillusioned with communism and founded the anti-communist and right-wing Australian Women's Guild of Empire in 1927. In 1941, Pankhurst became one of the founding members of the far-right nationalistic, Australia First Movement.

When the 1938 Dalfram dispute broke out during the Second Sino-Japanese War (members of the Waterside Workers' Federation of Australia refused to load pig iron onto the steamship SS Dalfram headed for Japan), Pankhurst wrote a report on the situation for Masao Shibusawa, head of a Japanese iron and steel firm. She was a paid Japanese agent.

At the outbreak of World War II, Pankhurst publicly spoke out against forming a trade alliance with America, saying that Japan would be a better trading partner. She visited Japan with her husband in 1939, and was arrested and interned in March 1942, under the Regulation 26 of the National Security Act, for her advocacy of peace with Japan and support for Nazi Germany. She was released in October. Throughout the war, she wrote articles presenting the German point of view and claiming that Japan would help maintain a "White Australia policy" in the Empire Gazette. After the end of the war, Pankhurst felt that fascism "had achieved a great deal," but withdrew from public life and political campaigning.

Pankhurst's husband Tom Walsh died in 1943 and afterwards, she withdrew from public life. In 1960, she converted to Roman Catholicism. She died on 23 May 1961, aged 75, and was buried according to Catholic rites. She was survived by her three children.

== Posthumous recognition ==
Pankhurst's name and picture (and those of 58 other women's suffrage supporters) are on the plinth of the statue of Millicent Fawcett in Parliament Square, London, unveiled in 2018.

Pankhurst Crescent, in the Canberra suburb of Gilmore, is named in her honour.

Helen Fraser wrote her reminiscences of Pankhurst; from when they first met at the time of early suffragette arrests, then in London, again at an Aberdeen by-election and latterly in Australia. Fraser stated that Pankhurst had "humour, the charm of the unexpected and unpredictable", among other qualities.. Fraser's tribute was published in the periodical Calling all women, the newsletter of the Suffragette Fellowship, in July 1961.

Brian Harrison recorded an oral history interview about Adela Pankhurst with her granddaughter, Susan Hogan, as part of the Suffrage Interviews project, titled Oral evidence on the suffragette and suffragist movements: the Brian Harrison interviews. The interview includes details of Pankhurst's family life in Australia and of her later life. The collection also contains an interview about her mother, Emmeline Pankhurst.

== See also ==
- History of feminism
- List of suffragists and suffragettes
- Women's suffrage in the United Kingdom
