= Gebre Kristos Desta =

Ethiopian artist and poet

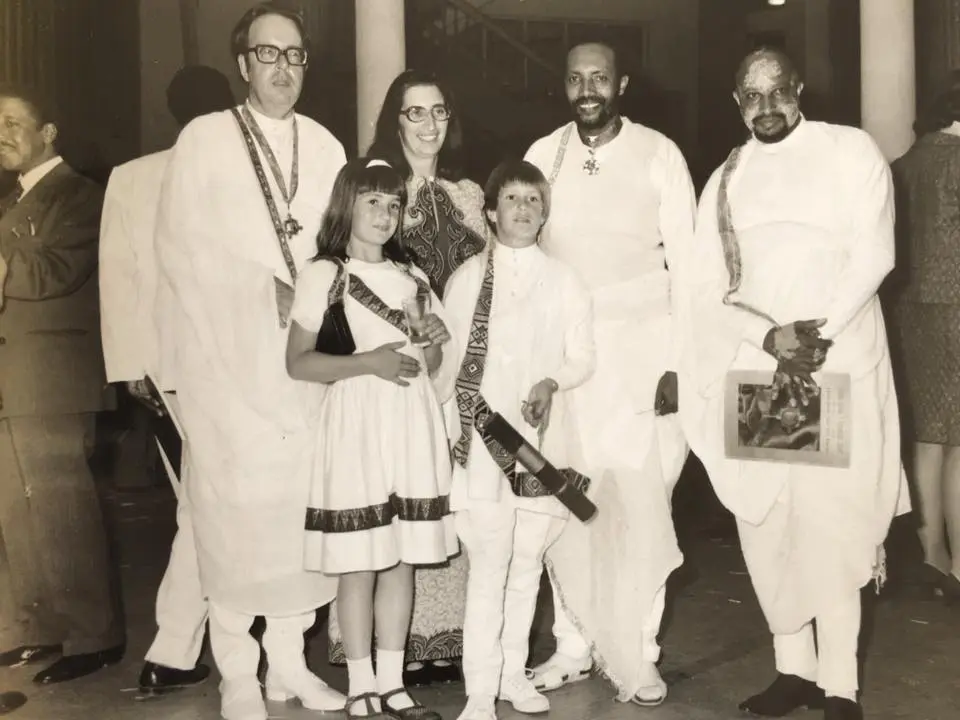
Richard and Rita Pankhurst, Tsegaye Gabre-Medhin, Gebre-Kristos Desta (at right), with Helen and Alula Pankhurst in front

Gebre Kristos Desta (Amharic: ገብረ ክርስቶስ ደስታ; 1932–1981), also known as Gebrekristos Desta, was an Ethiopian painter and poet. He is credited with bringing modern art to Ethiopia Both his paintings and poems stirred controversy among his countryfolk. He died young, at age fifty as a refugee living in the United States, but despite his short life he transformed Ethiopian art influenced many a young artist.

== Early life ==
Gebre Kristos was born in the town of Harar, the son of a high ranking clergyman Aleka Desta Nega, and was the youngest of six siblings. His father worked for Ras Makonnen, the governor of Harrar at the time, and was tutor to his son Ras Tafari Makonnen who was later crowned as Emperor Haile Selassie, the last emperor of Ethiopia.

Gebre Kristos spent his youth on regular activities like playing soccer and volleyball he also spent a great deal of his time under his father's tutelage copying and illustrating religious manuscripts, while assisting his father as an apprentice. His early influence and introduction to art, was the traditional religious art of the Ethiopian Orthodox Church.

He completed his elementary education in Harrar and attended the Haile Sellassie I Secondary School, and graduated from General Wingate High School. Early in his twenties Gebre Kristos developed a skin condition that altered his skin pigmentation. He would spend the rest of his life searching for a cure but would ultimately be unsuccessful. 90 percent of Ethiopia's population is in agriculture, so naturally he was encouraged by his family to become a professional farmer. Gebre chose not to pursue a career in agriculture but instead spent his personal time reading about art and painting when and where he could. Gebre was a self taught artist until his sophomore year in college when he left his studied to pursue becoming a professional full time artist. In 1957 he earned a scholarship to study art in Cologne, West Germany. He graduated top of his class. He was awarded with a private studio for his achievements. After his graduation he held his first exhibition at the Gallery Kuppers, Cologne, it encompassed a year's work and made an extensive six-month tour of Western Europe.

== Career ==
In 1962 Gebre Kristos returned to Ethiopia and introduced his newly adopted style, abstract expressionism. Initially his work was criticized for abandoning more conventional styles, at the time the art scene in Ethiopia was steeped in traditionalism. Despite frequent criticism he continued to create and refine his style, at the time he was also a faculty member of the Fine Arts school at Addis Ababa University, where he taught poetry and art. His art was displayed in many further exhibitions, both in Ethiopia and abroad. He held exhibitions in various countries such as West Germany, Greece, Senegal, Russia, India, Yugoslavia, Brazil and Ghana in an ambassadorial capacity.

== Reception ==
Gebre Kristos was criticized for including European techniques in his artwork, rather than staying with traditional local methods. However, he was also among the artists that enjoyed the patronage of Emperor Haile Selassie, who was trying to advance modernization of Ethiopia by promoting progressive ideas in education, art, and industry. In 1965 he received the Haile Selassie I Prize Trust Award for Fine Arts. The citation for this award praised him as an artist with outstanding creative and interpretive abilities and as the one who was largely responsible for introducing non-figurative art into his country.

In and around 1974 Gebre Kristos faced challenges especially with the new military government, the Derg, as his artistic expression was constantly being restricted. He was increasingly being asked to create propaganda material for political purposes. In 1978 while on an exhibition campaign to Kenya he defected and soon fled to Germany seeking asylum. The German government did not grant his request, but in 1980 the United States granted him political asylum and he settled in Lawton, Oklahoma. He only had one solo exhibition in Lawton before he died in 1981 at the age of 50.

The Gebre-Kristos Desta Modern Art Museum was established in 2009 in Addis Ababa and houses 30 of his works.
