= Christabel Pankhurst =

Suffragette, co-founder of Women's Social and Political Union, editor (1880–1958)

Dame Christabel Pankhurst DBE
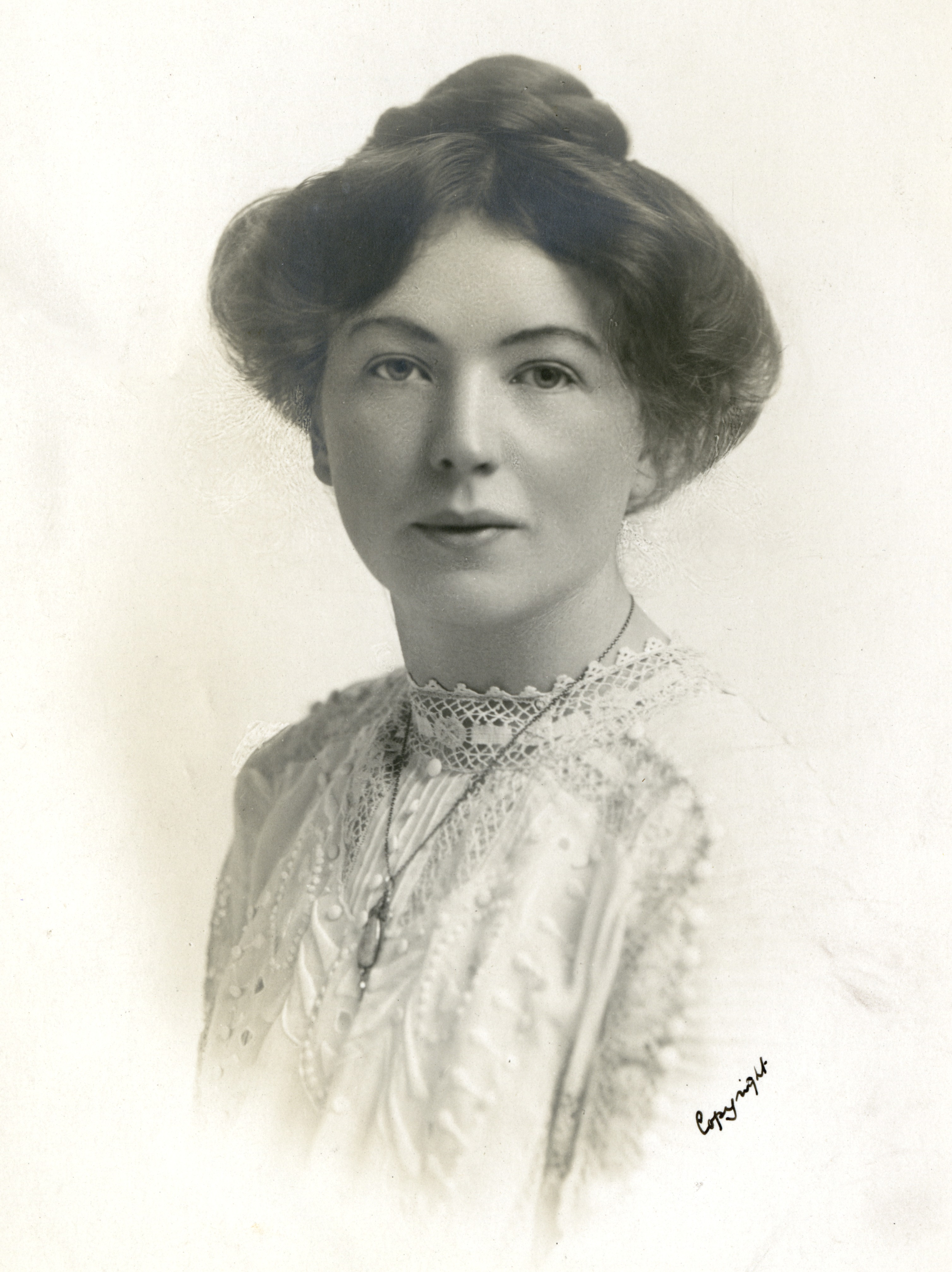
- Pankhurst, c. 1910
- Born: Christabel Harriette Pankhurst; 22 September 1880; Old Trafford, Manchester, England
- Died: 13 February 1958 (aged 77); Santa Monica, California, US
- Resting place: Woodlawn Memorial Cemetery
- Monuments: Emmeline and Christabel Pankhurst Memorial
- Education: Manchester High School for Girls; University of Manchester
- Occupations: Political activist and suffragette
- Employer: The Suffragette
- Political party: Labour Party
- Movement: Women's Social and Political Union
- Parent(s): Richard Pankhurst; Emmeline Goulden
- Relatives: Sophia Craine (maternal grandmother); Sylvia Pankhurst (sister); Adela Pankhurst (sister); Richard Pankhurst (nephew); Helen Pankhurst (great-niece); Alula Pankhurst (great-nephew)

Dame Christabel Harriette Pankhurst DBE (/ˈpæŋkhərst/; 22 September 1880 – 13 February 1958) was a British suffragette and Royalist born in Manchester, England. A co-founder of the Women's Social and Political Union (WSPU) and founder of The Suffragette newspaper, she directed militant actions from exile in France from 1912 to 1913. In 1914, she supported the war against Germany. After the war, she moved to the United States, where she worked as an evangelist for the Second Adventist movement.

== Early life ==
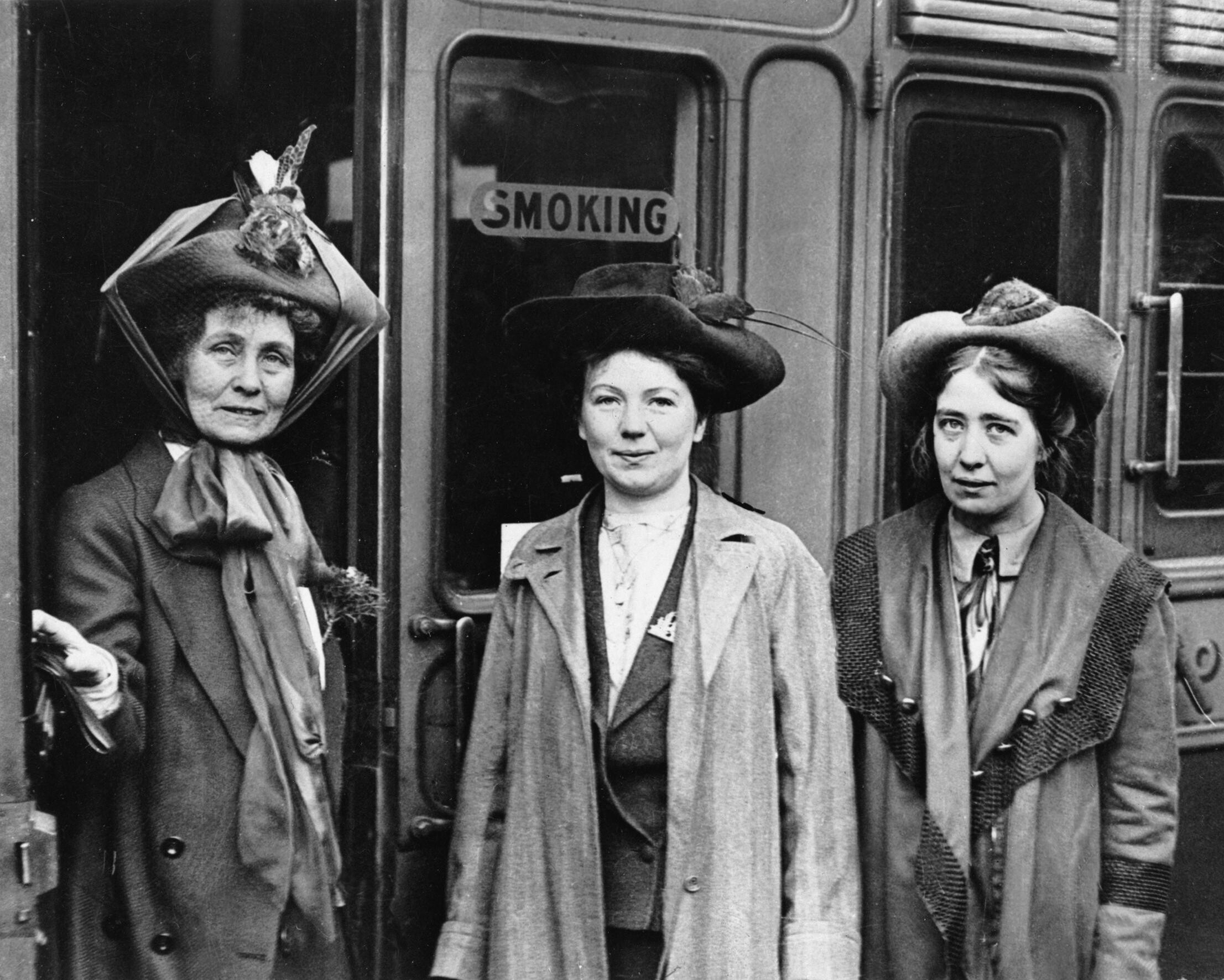
Emmeline Pankhurst (left), Christabel Pankhurst (centre) and Sylvia Pankhurst (right) at Waterloo Station, London, in 1911

Christabel Pankhurst was born on 22 September 1880 in Trafford, Manchester, England. She was the daughter of women's suffrage movement leader Emmeline Pankhurst and radical socialist barrister Richard Pankhurst, and sister to Sylvia Pankhurst and Adela Pankhurst. Her father was a barrister and her mother owned a small shop. Christabel assisted her mother, who worked as the Registrar of Births and Deaths in Manchester. Despite financial struggles, her family had always been encouraged by their firm belief in their devotion to causes rather than comforts. As a child, Christabel said: "how long you women have been trying for the vote. For my part, I mean to get it."

Nancy Ellen Rupprecht wrote, "She was almost a textbook illustration of the first child born to a middle-class family. In childhood as well as adulthood, she was beautiful, intelligent, graceful, confident, charming, and charismatic." Christabel enjoyed a special relationship with both her mother and father, who had named her after "Christabel", the poem by Samuel Taylor Coleridge ("The lovely lady Christabel / Whom her father loves so well"). Her mother's death in 1928 had a devastating impact on Christabel.

== Education ==
Pankhurst learned to read at her home on her own before she went to school. She and her two sisters attended Manchester High School for Girls. She obtained a law degree from the University of Manchester, and received honours on her LL.B. exam but, as a woman, was not permitted to join an Inn and practise law.

Pankhurst moved to Geneva to live with a family friend, but, when her father died in 1898, returned home to help her mother raise the rest of the children.

Pankhurst and her mother were members of the Labour Party.

== Activism ==
=== Suffrage ===
Pankhurst was a founder member of the Women's Social and Political Union (WSPU) with her mother on 10 October 1903. The WSPU aimed to campaign for the parliamentary vote for women on the same terms as it was given to men.

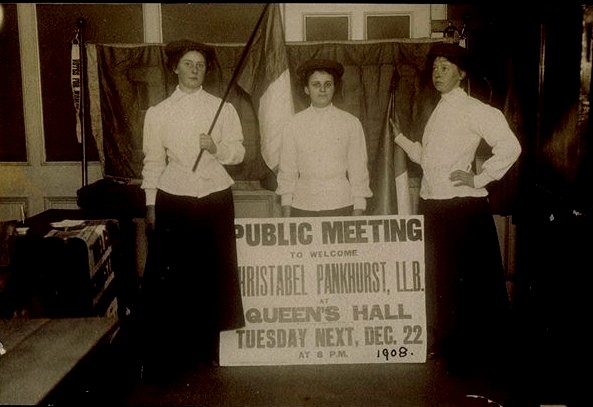
Charlotte Marsh, Dorothy Radcliffe and Elsa Gye in December 1908 organising a welcome for Christabel Pankhurst after she left prison

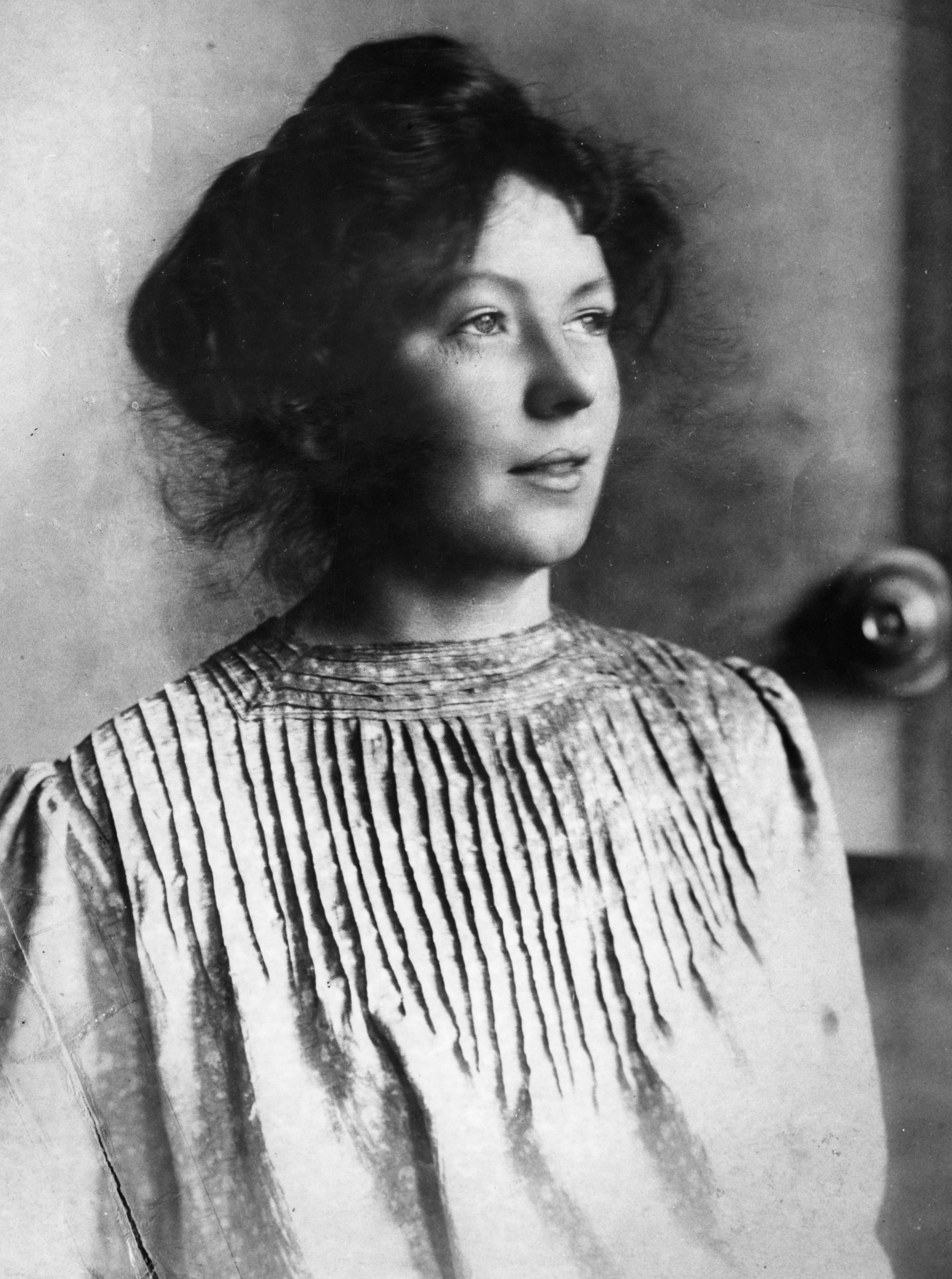
Pankhurst c. 1905–1910

On 25 July 1904 Pankhurst published an article in the Daily Dispatch newspaper covering a visit to Manchester by Susan B. Anthony, titled "Woman's Rights: An American reformer in Manchester." In November 1904, Pankhurst was a North of England Society for Women's Suffrage delegate to the National Union of Women's Suffrage Societies (NUWSS) convention in London.

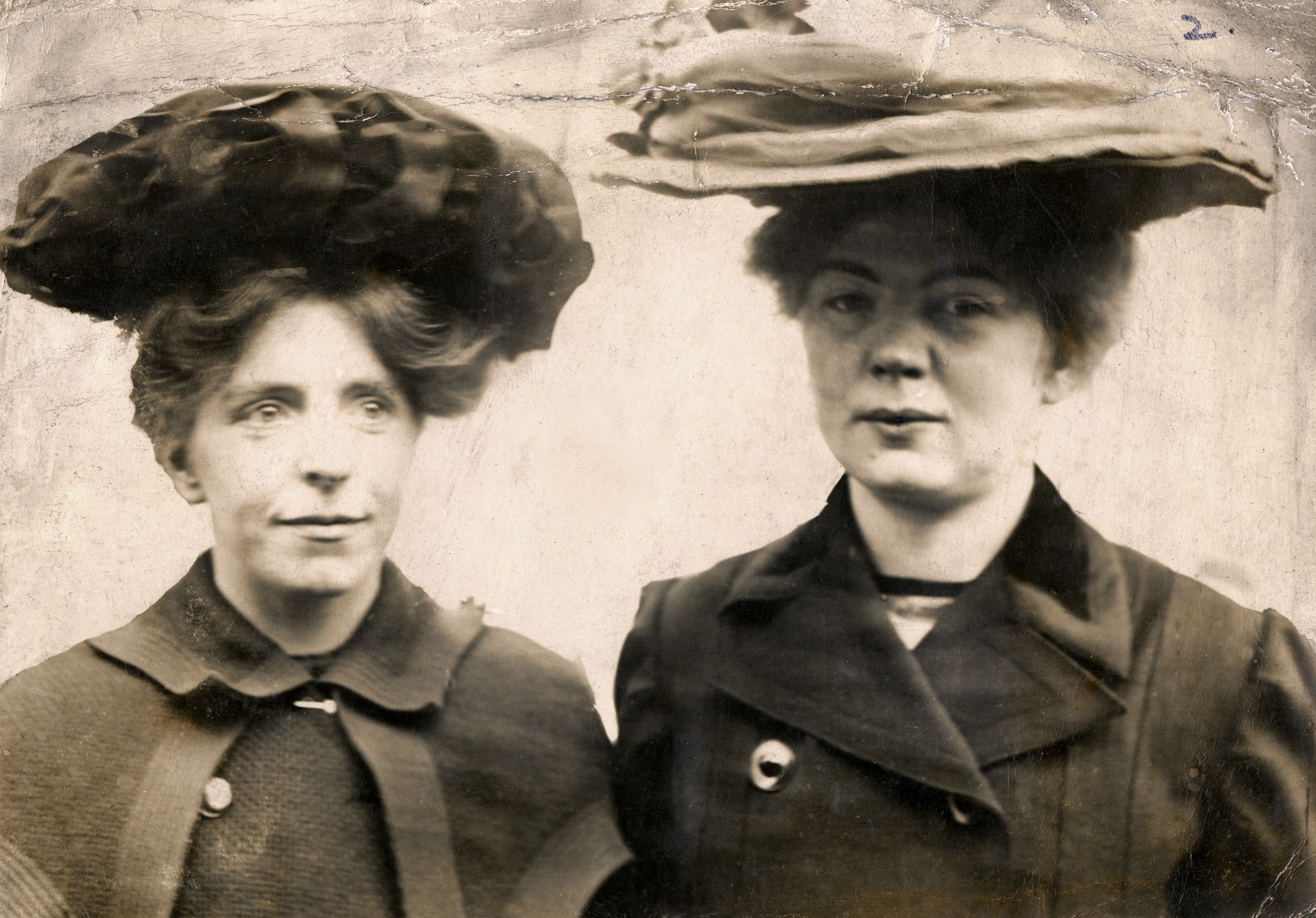
Annie Kenney and Christabel Pankhurst, c.1905–1912

In 1905, Pankhurst interrupted a Liberal Party meeting at Manchester's Free Trade Hall by unfurling a Votes For Women banner hidden in her blouse and shouting demands for voting rights for women. She spat in the policeman's face and was arrested. At Manchester Police Court, along with fellow suffragette Annie Kenney, she was sentenced to a week in prison for obstruction, rather than pay a fine. They were the first suffragettes to be imprisoned, their case gained much media interest and the ranks of the WSPU swelled following their trial. For example, after reading an article about the arrest while in South Africa, Emmeline Pethick-Lawrence joined the WSPU on returning to England. Helena Swanwick also joined the WSPU after reading of the arrest and later wrote that her "heart rose up in support of their revolt." Her mother Emmeline began to take more militant action for the women's suffrage cause after her daughter's arrest and was herself imprisoned on many occasions for her principles.

After obtaining her law degree in 1906, Christabel moved to the nearby London headquarters of the WSPU, where she was appointed its organising secretary. She lodged with Emmeline and Frederick Pethick-Lawrence in London and in Surrey.

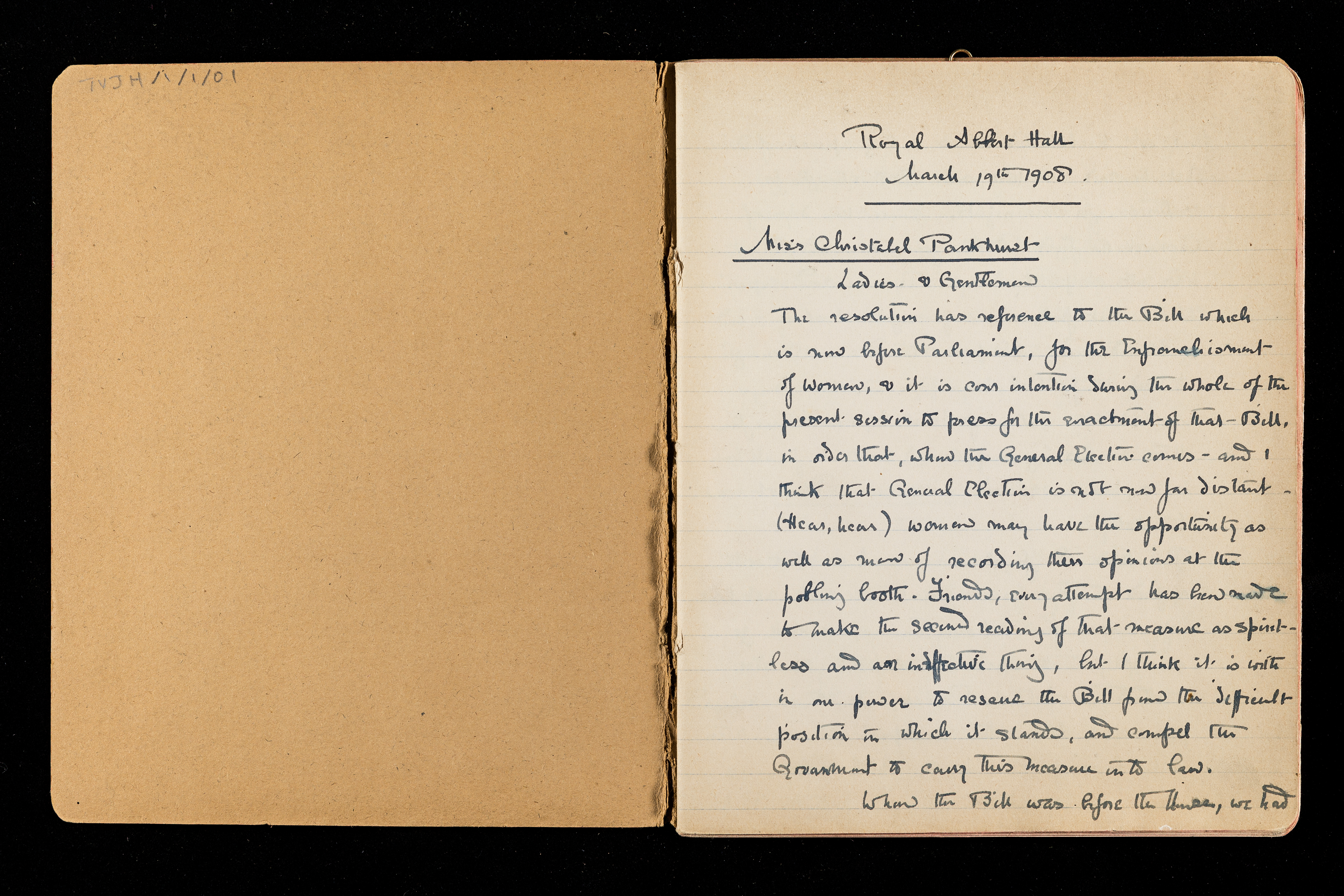
Vera Holme's transcript of speeches made by Pankhurst and her mother at the Royal Albert Hall on 19 March 1908

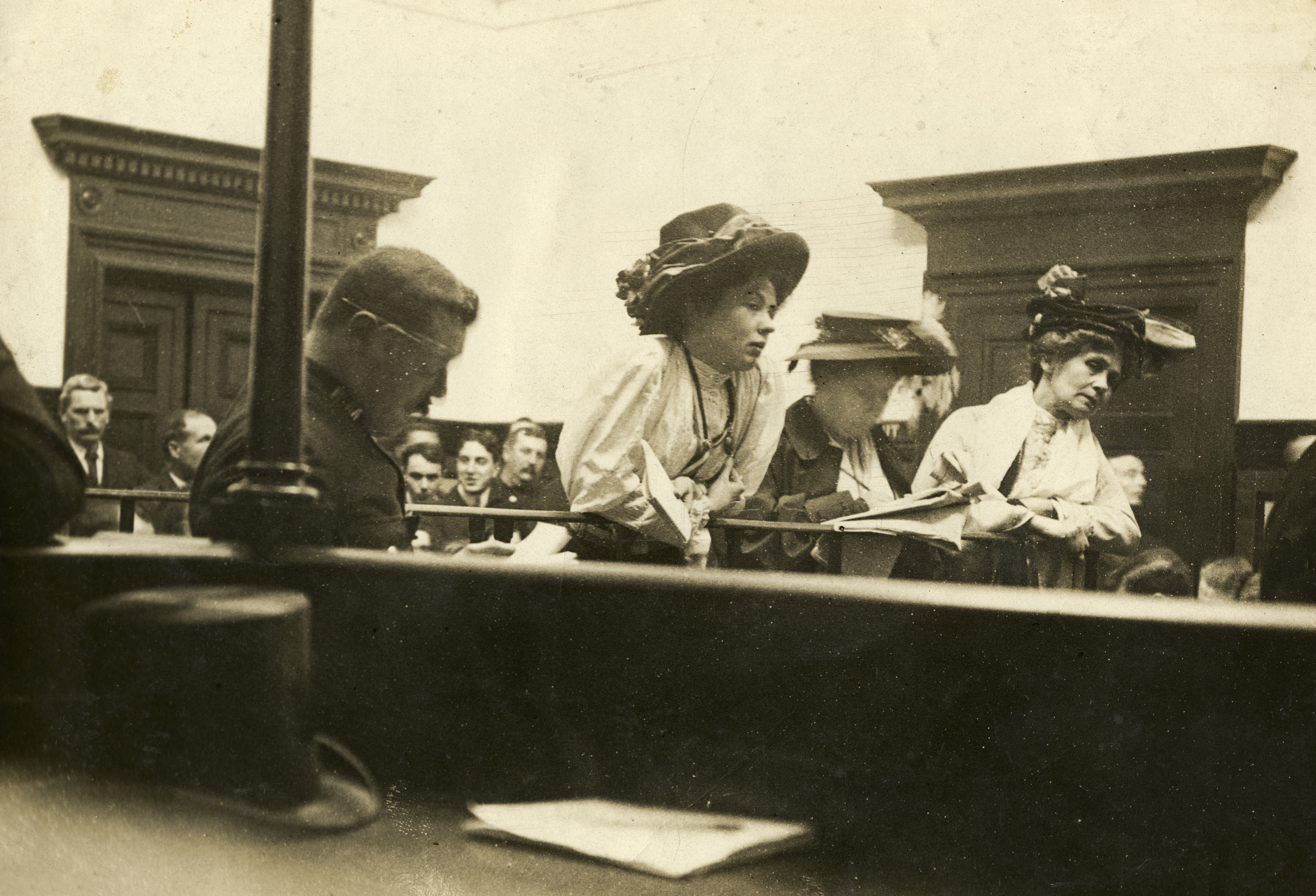
Pankhurst, Flora Drummond and Pankhurst's mother Emmeline in court after their arrest over inciting a "rush" on Parliament in October 1908

Nicknamed "Queen of the Mob", Pankhurst was jailed again in 1907 after an arrest in Parliament Square. Pankhurst gave a speech at the Nottingham Mechanics Institute in December 1907, which inspired Helen Watts to join the cause. Pankhurst and her mother Emmeline gave speeches at the Royal Albert Hall on 19 March 1908, which were recorded as transcripts by the actress, chauffeur and suffragette Vera Holme.

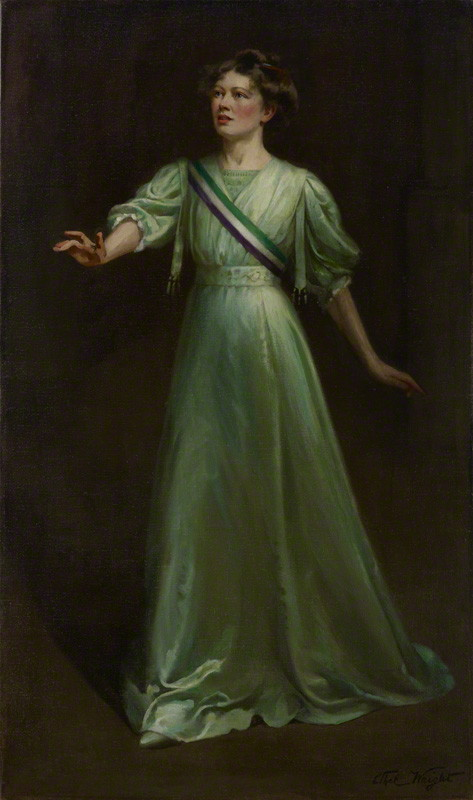
Pankhurst by Ethel Wright, 1909

Pankhurst, her mother Emmeline and "The General" Flora Drummond were arrested for inciting a "rush" on Parliament when speaking to a mass meeting from the plinth of Nelson's Column, Trafalgar Square, London, on 11 October 1908. They were tried in 1909 at the "Rush Trial" at Bow Street Magistrates' Court, with Pankhurst using her law education for their defence and even cross examining David Lloyd George (then Chancellor of the Exchequer) and Herbert Gladstone. During the trial, she highlighted that one of Lloyd George's daughters had been in attendance at the mass meeting. Following a successful defence, the three were "bound over" by the court to keep the peace with accompanying fines, but refused to pay the fines and were sentenced to imprisonment. Pankhurst was sentenced to ten weeks in the second division.

Pankhurst was painted wearing a sash in the suffragette colours of green, white and purple by society portraitist and suffragist Ethel Wright, for the WSPU's Women's Exhibition held in London in 1909. The portrait is now held in the collection of the National Portrait Gallery in London. She was a speaker at WSPU meetings, including to a mass gathering at the Savoy Theatre on 15 February 1912.

In October 1912, The Suffragette newspaper was established as WSPU's official newspaper, replacing Votes for Women, with Pankhurst as editor and Agnes Lake as business manager. In 1912, she wrote that: "Militant methods have been good for the souls of women ... they have swept away the evils of ‘ladyism’, of timid gentility, of early Victorian effeminacy as distinct from womanliness."

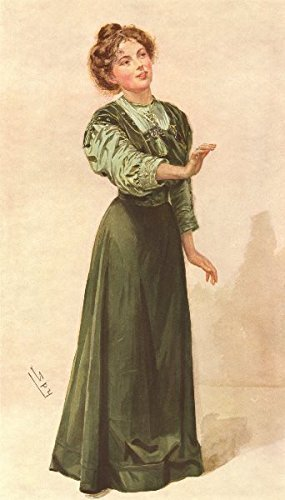
Illustration of Pankhurst in the London magazine Vanity Fair, 15 June 1910

Between 1913 and 1914 Pankhurst lived at a secret location in Paris, France, to escape imprisonment under the terms of the Prisoners (Temporary Discharge for Ill-Health) Act, better known as the "Cat and Mouse Act." Other campaigners visited Paris to have Christmas dinner with her in 1912; these included Irene Dallas, Hilda Dallas, Blanche Edwards and Alice Morgan Wright.

While in France, Pankhurst continued to provide the editorial lead to The Suffragette through her contact with visitors, such as Annie Kenney and Ida Wylie, who crossed the Channel for her advice. She also wrote an article for New Statesman in October 1913, calling to women for a militant approach in the fight for a female vote.

Pankhurst was influential in the WSPU's "anti-male" phase after the failure of the Conciliation Bills. She wrote a book called The Great Scourge and How to End It on the subject of sexually transmitted diseases and how sexual equality (votes for women) would help the fight against these diseases. In 1921, she wrote an article explaining why she never married, saying that the suffrage cause took all of her primary attention.

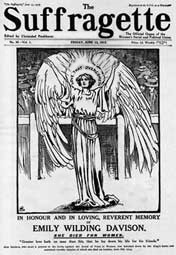
The Suffragette, the newspaper edited by Pankhurst, Emily Wilding Davison memorial issue

Pankhurst and her sister Sylvia did not get along. Sylvia was against turning the WSPU towards solely upper-class and middle-class women and using militant tactics, while Christabel thought it was essential. Christabel felt that suffrage was a cause that should not be tied to any causes trying to help working-class women with their other issues. She felt that it would only drag the suffrage movement down and that all of the other issues could be solved once women had the right to vote.

=== Wartime activities ===
At the outbreak of World War I, Pankhurst and her mother were in St Malo, France. On 8 September 1914, Pankhurst re-appeared at London's Royal Opera House after her long exile. She was again arrested. She engaged in a hunger strike, ultimately serving only 30 days of a three-year sentence. She began campaigning for the war effort, uttering a declaration on "The German Peril", in campaign led by the former General Secretary of the WSPU, Norah Dacre Fox in conjunction with the British Empire Union and the National Party. Along with Dacre Fox (later known as Norah Elam), Pankhurst toured the country making patriotic recruiting speeches. Her sister Sylvia's memoir included a reference to some of Christabel's supporters handing the white feather to every young man they encountered wearing civilian dress.

The Suffragette appeared again on 16 April 1915 as a war paper and on 15 October changed its name to Britannia, with this new name aiming to communicate "patriotic and imperialist intent." In Britannia's weekly pages, Pankhurst called for the military conscription of men and the industrial conscription of women into national service and advocated to pause the campaign for women's suffrage for the duration of the war. It also published articles covering the skills of "women munition makers" and encouraging women to study science and engineering.

Throughout the war, Pankhurst gave regular speeches with a peace only after victory stance. She called for the internment of all people of enemy nationality, including both men and women, young and old. Her supporters attended Hyde Park meetings with placards reading: "Intern Them All". Pankhurst also championed a more complete and thorough enforcement of the blockade of enemy and neutral nations, arguing that this must be "a war of attrition". She demanded the resignation of Sir Edward Grey, Lord Robert Cecil, General William Robertson and Sir Eyre Crowe, whom she considered too mild and dilatory in method. Britannia was many times raided by the police and experienced greater difficulty in appearing than had befallen The Suffragette. Indeed, although occasionally Norah Dacre Fox's father, John Doherty, who owned a printing firm, was drafted in to print campaign posters, Britannia was compelled at last to set up its own printing press.

=== 1918 General Election campaign in Smethwick ===
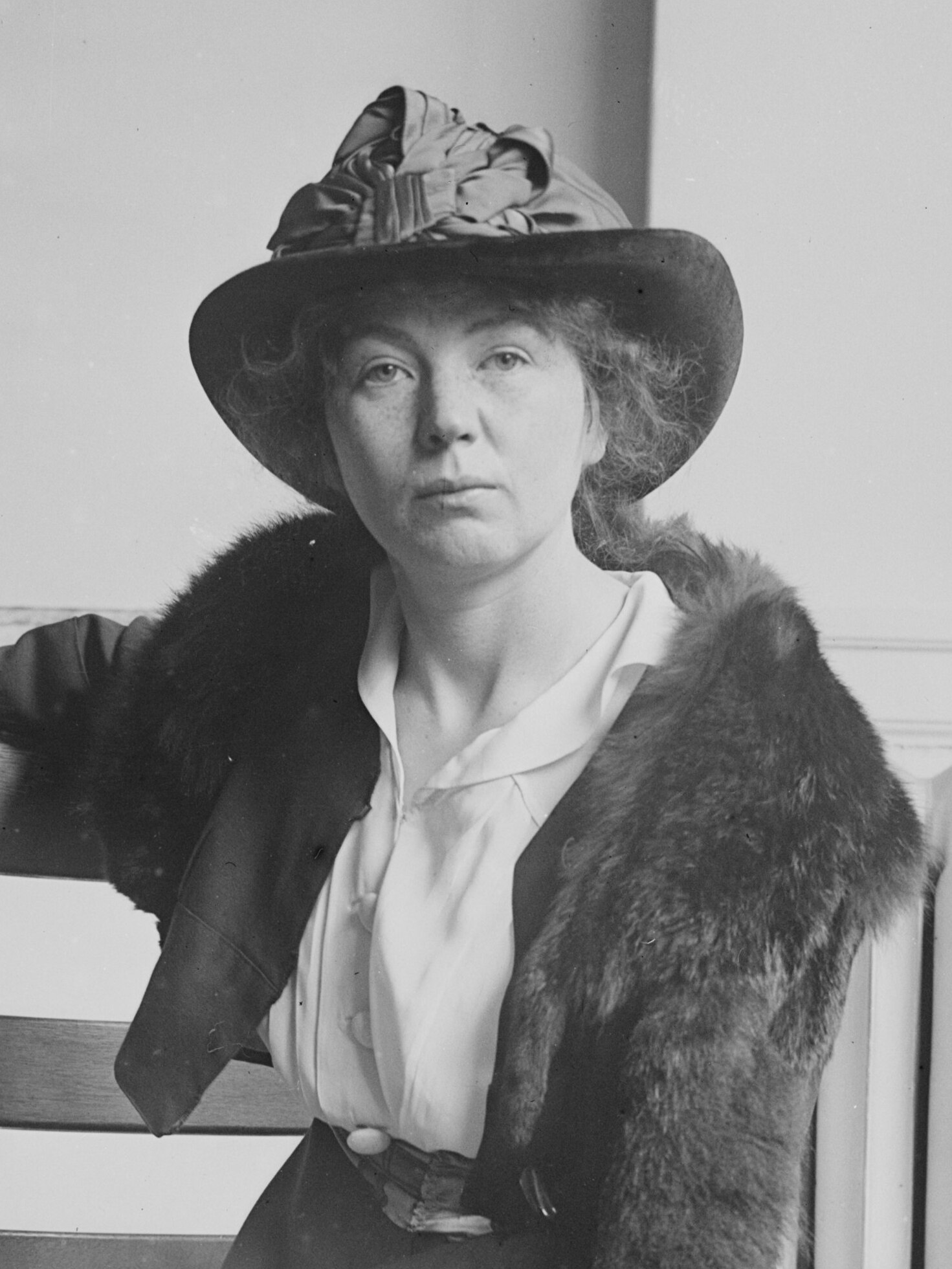
Pankhurst on 6 December 1918

After some British women were granted the right to vote at the end of World War I, Pankhurst announced that she would stand in the 1918 general election. At first she said she would contest Westbury in Wiltshire but at the last minute stood as a Women's Party candidate, in the Smethwick constituency in alliance with the Lloyd George/Conservative Coalition. She was issued with the "Coalition Coupon" letter, signed by both Liberal and Unionist leaders. Her campaign focussed on a "Victorious Peace", "the Germans must pay for the War" and "Britain for the British". She gained 8,614 votes and was narrowly defeated, by only 775 votes, by the Labour Party candidate, local trade union leader John Davison. Some scholars believe that Pankhurst would have won if women under thirty had been enfranchised, as most of her followers were from this demographic.

=== Move to California ===
Leaving England in 1921, Pankhurst moved to the United States where she became an Evangelical Christian with the Plymouth Brethren and a prominent member of Second Adventist movement. She was critical of "The Red Dean of Canterbury," Hewlett Johnson, and those who she felt diluted the Word of God. Her evangelism further exacerbated her relationship with her sister Sylvia, but she was appreciated for her Bible teaching by the Christian movement.

==== Prophetic interests ====
Marshall, Morgan, and Scott published Pankhurst's works on subjects related to her prophetic outlook, which took its character from John Nelson Darby's perspectives. Pankhurst lectured and wrote books on the Second Coming and wrote a regular column in The Christian newspaper. Pankhurst was engaged by the Bible Testimony Fellowship as a speaker and was a frequent guest on television shows in the 1950s and had a reputation for being an odd combination of "former suffragist revolutionary, evangelical Christian, and almost stereotypically proper 'English Lady' who always was in demand as a lecturer". While living in California, she adopted her daughter Betty, finally having recovered from her mother's death.

=== Damehood ===
Pankhurst returned to Britain for a period in the 1930s and gave lectures on current world events at Aeolian Hall in London. She was appointed a Dame Commander of the Order of the British Empire "for public and social services" in the 1936 New Year Honours. At the onset of World War II, she again left for the United States, to live in Los Angeles, California.

== Death ==
Pankhurst died on 13 February 1958 in Santa Monica, California, aged 77. She died of a heart attack sitting in a straight-backed chair and was buried in the Woodlawn Memorial Cemetery in Santa Monica.

== In popular culture ==
Pankhurst was played by Patricia Quinn in the BBC television series Shoulder to Shoulder (1974).

Pankhurst features in the Sylvia (musical) and was played by Whitney White.

== Posthumous recognition ==
A profile bust of Christabel Pankhurst (left picture) on the right pylon of the Emmeline and Christabel Pankhurst Memorial in Victoria Tower Gardens was added to the memorial in 1959; it was unveiled on 13 July 1959 by Viscount Kilmuir. Her name and image (and those of 58 other women's suffrage supporters) are etched on the plinth of the statue of Millicent Fawcett in Parliament Square, London, that was unveiled in 2018.

In 2006, a blue plaque (right picture) for Christabel and her mother was placed by English Heritage at 50, Clarendon Road, Notting Hill, London W11 3AD, where they had lived. Another blue plaque was erected on 19 October 2018 by the Marchmont Association at 8 Russell Square, London, WC1B 5BE.

In 2023, the Christabel Pankhurst Institute for Health Technology and Innovation was opened at the University of Manchester.

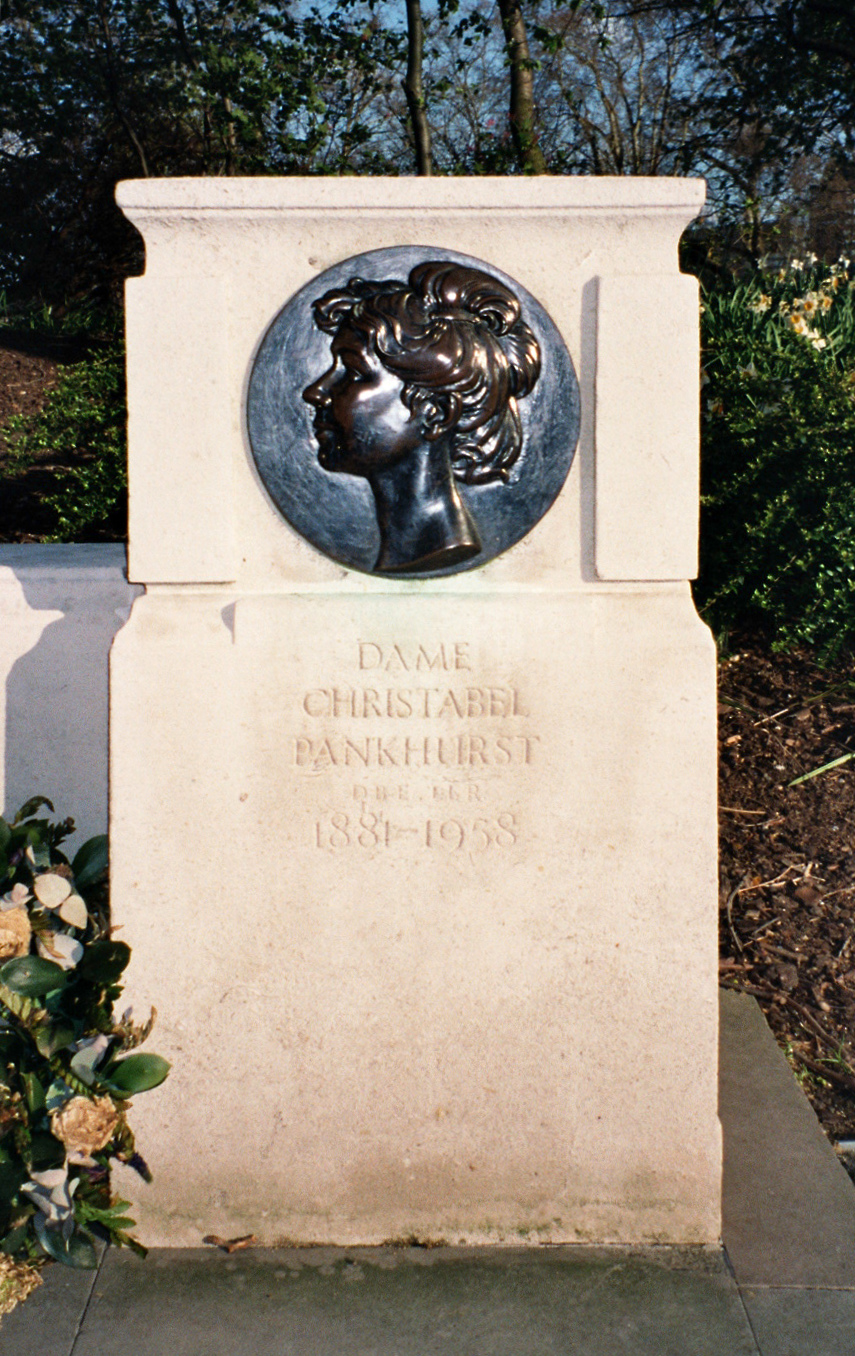
A profile bust of Christabel Pankhurst

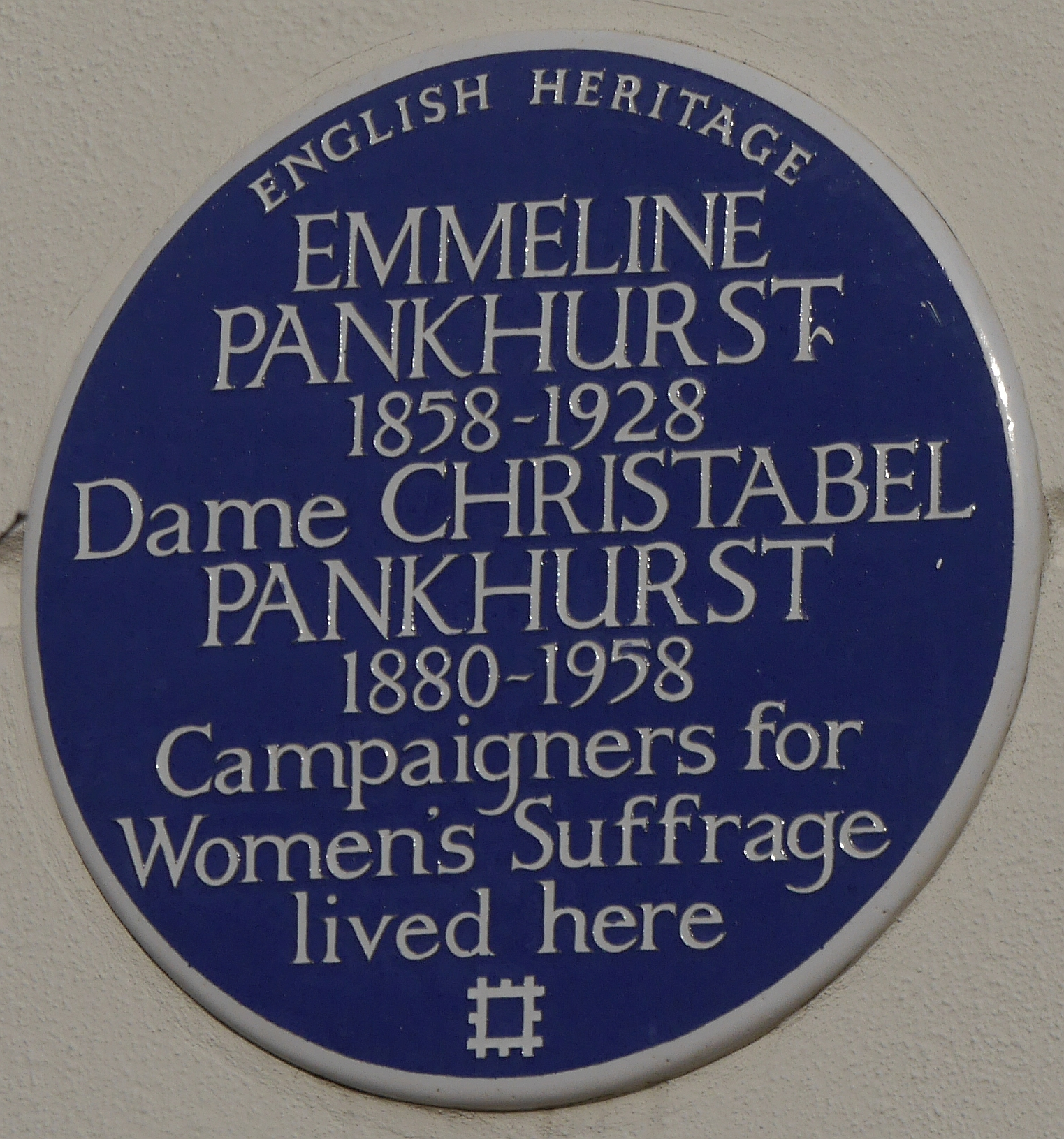
English Heritage blue plaque for Christabel & Emmeline Pankhurst

== Works ==
- Pankhurst, Christabel (1907). "The Legal Disabilities of Women". The Case for Women's Suffrage: 84–98. Wikidata Q107183571.

== See also ==
- History of feminism
- List of suffragists and suffragettes
- Suffragette bombing and arson campaign
- List of women's rights activists
- Pankhurst Centre in Manchester
- Timeline of women's suffrage
- Women's suffrage in the United Kingdom
- Women's suffrage organisations
