= Jill Rubery =

Researcher of gender equality

Jill Rubery (born 4 November 1951) is a Professor of Comparative Employment Systems at Alliance Manchester Business School (AMBS) at the University of Manchester. Her research focuses on comparative analyses of employment systems with a specialisation in gender and labour market structure. She was made a fellow of the British Academy in 2006.

== Education and work ==
Rubery was born in Newcastle upon Tyne on 4 November 1951 to Austin and Gladys Rubery. She attended Wintringham Grammar School for Girls. Rubery obtained her Bachelor of Arts in Economics and Politics from the University of Cambridge at Newnham College in 1973. She received her Master of Arts from the University of Cambridge in 1978 and completed her doctorate at New Hall (now Murray Edwards College) at the University of Cambridge in 1987.

Rubery worked as a researcher in labour economics, women's employment and low pay at the Department of Applied Economics at the University of Cambridge from 1976 to 1991. She became a lecture at the Manchester School of Management in 1989 and was made a professor there in 1995. She joined Alliance Manchester Business School at the University of Manchester in 2004. She was deputy director of AMBS from 2007 to 2013 and is the executive director of the Work and Equalities Institute at the University of Manchester.

Rubery has acted as an advisor to the Equal Opportunities Commission, ILO, UNECE, OECD and ETUC. She has conducted major research projects with the EU, including Minimum Wages and Social Dialogue and Public Sector Pay and Social Dialogue. She coordinated the European Commission's expert group on gender and social inclusion and employment for fourteen years. She is the associate editor of the Cambridge Journal of Economics, Gender, Work and Organisation.

Rubery sits on the steering committee of GM4Women2028 which is a registered charity creating change for the women on Manchester. Other committee members include Prof Francesca Gains and Dr Helen Pankhurst.

== Scholarship ==
=== Structured Labour Markets: Worker Organisation and Low Pay (1978) ===
Rubery published this article in the Cambridge Journal of Economics. In the article she seeks to explain the continued presence of low paid sectors in developed capitalist economies. She studies the relationship between the development of the economic structure and the growth of segmentation in labour markets.

Rubery rejects the American model which is used to explain labour market segmentation. She argues that the model doesn't make sense outside of the US because the lack of attention paid to role of trade unions in process of labour market development. She criticises the model's focus on the end of the 19th century and early 20th century, arguing that it isn't applicable to the present day.

Rubery argues for the need to see the role of workers and work organisations as central to the development of the labour market structure. She sees the developments occurring in the context of a continuous struggle between capitalists and workers over wages and means of production.

Rubery uses the dual labour market and radical theories to assess the emergence of low paid sectors in successful economies. Dual labour market theory attributes segmentation to technical change and radical theory blames capitalists’ aim of dividing and conquering the labour force. She argues that the main progression both theories need to make is to recognise that segmentation has its roots in the development in the capitalist system. She also calls for more weight to be given to the role of worker organisations.

Rubery blames the development of monopoly capitalism as the main reason for segmentation in the labour market. She argues that monopoly capitalism is not conducive to industrial organisation and that the process of its development destroys jobs and makes certain skills redundant. Competition reduces bargaining power and workers struggle to get and keep a job. The structure is dominated by low skilled jobs and the proportion of labour in high productivity industries decline over time.

Rubery also details the role of trade unions and how they have changed over time. She argues that the growth trade union organisation increases primary sector employment, job security and wages.

Rubery concludes that the stratification process is more complex than any previous theories have allowed for. She highlights all the continuous forces at play in the uneven development of monopoly capitalism. She recognises the complicated role that trade unions have played, both shaping the labour market structure as well as being shaped by the labour market themselves. She calls for future analysis to take into account the continuous nature of segmentation, the role of trade unions and to look at different patterns across different sectors over time to understand the process of labour market segmentation.

=== Women and Recession (1988) ===
In this book edited by Rubery, she brought together eight essays that examine patterns of women's participation in the labour market in Britain, Italy, France and the US since World War II, and the impact of the 1980s recession. The book draws on case studies done by the Cambridge Labour Studies Group, and works to explain the process of resegregation in the contemporary labour market.

The first section of the book looks at how business cycles and restructuring determined the demand for female labour in each place. The second section exams the ways that the supply side of the economy relates to demand in the labour market and creates patterns of gendered employment.

The first section finds a number of similarities between the countries despite their varying circumstances. The authors of the essays find that the business cycle shaped demand for female labour. They recognise that the rise in married women's labour after the war played a big role in post war recovery in each country studied. They study the impact of recession in the post war decades too. Female participation in the labour force kept increasing while men's employment in industry fell. Female participation led to a rise in part-time and temporary work. They find that recession prompted a move from labour-intensive production to capital intensive production and ended the use of women as a supplementary supply in the labour market. These outcomes combined meant that increased female participation led a restructuring of the labour market and of the working class.

The authors found a continuance of the gender segregation in every country from World War II onwards. In 1988, most women were still in feminised jobs. These jobs remain low paid, perceived as unskilled and unprotected even though women were increasing their training, education and workforce participation.

In the second section, women's integration of the workplace was found to have had impacts on the family form and household. Dual income households had become much more common as a way of keeping up living standards. This had increased the inequality between single wage earning and multiple wage earning households.

The authors explored the varying impacts the state had on women's experience of employment in the four countries. They found that the state had an overall negative impact on employed women's wellbeing but in different ways. In Britain and the US, state policies had sought to exploit and increase female unpaid labour in the face of a recession and debt crisis. In France and Italy, women were faced with underfunded programs and ill focused policies. Regardless of state policy, every country saw an increase in dual income households, single parent households and on average lower levels of compensation and protection for women in employment.

In the third section, the authors made recommendations for the improvement of women's positions as permanent labour force. They argued that, while women can seek to improve their individual positions through training and education, macro level changes are needed for any major improvements. These include an improvement in social welfare services, income support and regulation of the labour market. The authors also highlighted the need for women workers to participate in labour movements to address the growing disparity of interests between working class and professional women, single and dual income households and white women and women of colour. Overall, the book illuminates the process of women's integration into the labour force in the four countries and shows the significant role that gender has played in the economies of post war France, Italy, Britain and US.

=== Women’s Employment in Europe: Trends and Prospects (1999) ===
Rubery co authored this book with Mark Smith and Colette Fagan. The authors identified the involvement of women in wage work as one of the most important changes in European society. In light of this, the book focuses on the fifteen member states of EU at the time of its publication. The authors found notable differences between the countries, focusing on four areas of inequality: care and wage work, occupational segregation, pay and working time.

The book has two aims. This first is to analyse recent employment trends and conclude whether progress has actually been made. The second is to come up with indicators for the future of female employment in Europe, using current trends and restructuring. The authors argue for the continued need to consider and study women's employment as separate from men's employment, as female integration into the workforce varies greatly across countries, and continues to be marked by the differences between men and women in a professional environment.

Part I looks at women's employment in a changing Europe. The authors found that women continued to grow as a share of employment in the face of recessions, showing that women were forming a permanent part of the labour market and no longer were a labour reserve. Falls in fertility rates and investment in education is taken as evidence of women's determination to remain in the labour market. The authors also found that women were having fewer children, having children at an older age, marrying later, remaining single or not having children at all. There was also an increase in single mothers and unmarried couples with children. They found this change was instigated by both men and women, brought about by changes in social values as well as changes in women's participation in the labour market. There was variation across Europe, however. In southern Europe and Ireland, the male breadwinner model was much more common while Nordic countries had moved furthest away from this model while maintaining high birth rates. The last finding was an increase in the dependency ratio as a result of fertility decline and rising life expectancy. They authors found that the burden falls on women to look after ageing relatives, and were more at risk at being in poverty when they aged themselves because of longer life expectancies and lower average earnings.

Part II looked at the indicators of women's employment in the 1990s. The authors studied the increase in flexible employment during the 1990s which came about as labour markets were deregulated. One phenomenon that appeared was increases in part-time and temporary work. Men tended to participate in this at the beginning and end of their careers, but women participated in it for their whole careers. The authors argued that further deregulation could make gender disparities greater. Longer part-time hours in the service sector would likely be worked by women and see a growth in the gender gap.

Part III is a reflection on trends and future prospects of women in the labour market. The authors found the 1997 Part Time Workers Directive as one of the few indicators that the position of women in the labour market would be protected by the EU. They also comment on the decision to include equal opportunities as a pillar of European employment policy. They conclude that labour market policy needs to evolve to a level that embraces interests of both men and women and supports the reduction of inequality, and only then can employment policy claim to have truly integrated equal opportunity.

=== Women and Recession Revisited (2013) ===
In this article, Rubery revisited her 1988 book Women and Recession with Anthony Rafferty. Rubery recalled her findings that the extent to which women act as a labour reserve depends on the gender segregation, female commitment to the labour market and state policies regarding female employment. The authors then looked at the role these factors in the 2008 financial crisis and austerity policies that followed. They explored how demand affected women's labour market participation, gender segregation and the outcome of austerity policies for the future of women in the labour market.

The authors found that the trends in women's employment during and after the recession are evidence that gender segregation is the key factor in influencing women's position in the work force. They argued that women are more likely to lose their jobs than men, but that women were still becoming more permanent members of the workforce. They also found that the vulnerability of sectors changed over time. For example, the banking sector was hit the hardest in the crisis when it had been seen as a source of prosperity, and then the public sector suffered when it had been seen as a source of stability. Outsourcing became a main way to replace female labour in the public sector.

The authors also found that women were committed to becoming permanent members of the workforce and avoided acting as a part of flexible labour supply, calling themselves unemployed rather than inactive. This was supported by tax and benefit policies that assisted working parents and women, but these policies were drawn back in the face of the economic downturn. Policies then sought to move women back to being flexible labour. These trends might improve as the economy improves, but it did not bode well for policies with regards to female employment in future recessions.

The authors examined the costs and benefits of economic case for gender equality. The occurrence of the recession goes against the EU's employment strategy that work is available for everyone. Overall, the economic case provides evidence that women are beneficial to the workforce, but these business case policies need to support equal rights in order to gain the full benefits of female employment. The public sector has been successful in this area, suggesting that their policies are also influenced by social justice. Meanwhile, the private sector has yet to accept that the business case needs to be accompanied by support for gender equality.

The authors concluded that the recession had different but negative impacts on women in all sectors, with states reducing support for working mothers and not accompanying the pursuance of the business case for female employment with support for female workers. The emergence of the business case for female employment, however, has helped to commit women to the workforce and remain participants in the face of recessions. They concluded that this development would affect the UK government's plans to reduce unemployment figures by encouraging women to leave the labour force after the financial and debt crises.

=== The Triumph of Instrumental Over Equality Policy in European Employment Policy (2017) ===
In this article, Rubery analysed European Union gender equality policies the 1990s. She found that instrumental grounds were used to justify movements toward gender equality more and more. This was especially true in 2008, when all policy was justified by efficiency arguments, which resulted in public sector wage cuts.

Rubery examined the efficiency and equity arguments for gender equality. She recognised that gender equality policies justified by efficiency have had long lasting upsides, but have the danger of legitimising flexible labour markets, which can exploit female employment. Rubery highlighted the need for gender mainstreaming, which calls for the consideration of outcomes of policies for people of all genders. She argued that the EU needs to bear this in mind as it follows fiscal austerity and promotes flexibility in labour markets.

Rubery classified the motivations behind gender equality policies in three ways: adaptive, social justice and instrumental. Adaptive policies can either support women in the workplace by improving health and safety and maternity leave policies or work to change social norms in a way to benefit female workers. Social justice policies seek to improve women's position relative to men and in absolute terms. Instrumental policies work toward gender equality but are justified by other aims such as efficiency or higher employment.

Overall, Rubery found that the EU was not a consistent supporter of gender equality. Its support of lowering the minimum wage of its member states, cuts to public sector pay and neoliberal approaches to labour market policy. Rubery viewed the proposal to make gender equality a pillar of European social rights as a possible sign of a new age in terms of gender equality under the EU. She argued, however, that as long as the EU supports making labour markets more flexible to the detriment of female workers and lowering minimum wage, the EU cannot claim to be supporting gender equality. Rubery called feminists to come together and work against neoliberal and austerity policies to bring about a new type of labour market that will combine efficiency, equity and productivity.

== Awards ==
- Fellow of the British Academy (2006)
- Emeritus fellow, Murray Edwards College, University of Cambridge (2006)
- Researcher of the Year, Faculty of Humanities, University of Manchester (2014)
- Emerald best paper award, Employee Relations (2016)

== Selected works ==
- Marchington, Mick; Rubery, Jill; Grimshaw, Damian (2011). "Alignment, integration, and consistency in HRM across multi-employer networks". Human Resource Management. 50 (3): 313–339. doi:10.1002/hrm.20424.
- Rubery, Jill; Grimshaw, Damian (2003). "Multinationals and the organization of employment". The organization of employment. pp. 198–221. doi:10.1007/978-1-137-10224-9_8 (inactive 1 July 2025). ISBN 978-0-333-80236-6.
- Bosch, G.; Lehndorff, S.; Rubery, J. (2009). European Employment Models in Flux. doi:10.1057/9780230237001. ISBN 978-1-349-30859-0.
- Beynon, Huw; Grimshaw, Damian; Rubery, Jill; Ward, Kevin (2002). Managing Employment Change. doi:10.1093/acprof:oso/9780199248698.001.0001. ISBN 9780199248698.
- Marchington, Mick; Grimshaw, Damien; Rubery, Jill; Wilmott, Hugh (2004). Fragmenting Work. doi:10.1093/acprof:oso/9780199262236.001.0001. ISBN 9780199262236.
- Rubery, J. (2011). "Towards a gendering of the labour market regulation debate". Cambridge Journal of Economics. 35 (6): 1103–1126. doi:10.1093/cje/ber001.
- Grimshaw, D.; Rubery, J. (2012). "The end of the UK's liberal collectivist social model? The implications of the coalition government's policy during the austerity crisis". Cambridge Journal of Economics. 36: 105–126. doi:10.1093/cje/ber033.
- Rubery, Jill; Earnshaw, Jill; Marchington, Mick; Cooke, Fang Lee; Vincent, Steven (2002). "Changing Organizational Forms and the Employment Relationship". Journal of Management Studies. 39 (5): 645–672. doi:10.1111/1467-6486.00306.
- Rubery, Jill; Cooke, Fang Lee; Earnshaw, Jill; Marchington, Mick (2003). "Inter-organizational Relations and Employment in a Multi-employer Environment". British Journal of Industrial Relations. 41 (2): 265–289. doi:10.1111/1467-8543.00272. S2CID 154590996.
- Grimshaw, Damian; Beynon, Huw; Rubery, Jill; Ward, Kevin (2002). "The Restructuring of Career Paths in Large Service Sector Organizations: 'Delayering', Upskilling and Polarisation". The Sociological Review. 50: 89–115. doi:10.1111/1467-954X.00356. S2CID 110281098.
- Rubery, Jill (2002). "Gender mainstreaming and gender equality in the EU: The impact of the EU employment strategy". Industrial Relations Journal. 33 (5): 500–522. doi:10.1111/1468-2338.00250. S2CID 153515752.
- Rubery, Jill; Grimshaw, Damian; Figueiredo, Hugo (2005). "How to close the gender pay gap in Europe: Towards the gender mainstreaming of pay policy". Industrial Relations Journal. 36 (3): 184–213. doi:10.1111/j.1468-2338.2005.00353.x. S2CID 153582004.
- Ward, Kevin; Grimshaw, Damian; Rubery, Jill; Beynon, Huw (2001). "Dilemmas in the management of temporary work agency staff". Human Resource Management Journal. 11 (4): 3–21. doi:10.1111/j.1748-8583.2001.tb00048.x.
- Rubery, Jill; Urwin, Peter (2011). "Bringing the employer back in: Why social care needs a standard employment relationship". Human Resource Management Journal. 21 (2): 122–137. doi:10.1111/j.1748-8583.2010.00138.x.
- Grimshaw, Damian; Rubery, Jill; Marchington, Mick (2010). "Managing people across hospital networks in the UK: Multiple employers and the shaping of HRM". Human Resource Management Journal. 20 (4): 407–423. doi:10.1111/j.1748-8583.2010.00144.x.
- Rubery, Jill (2011). "Reconstruction amid deconstruction: Or why we need more of the social in European social models". Work, Employment and Society. 25 (4): 658–674. doi:10.1177/0950017011419718. S2CID 154812918.
- Grimshaw, Damian; Ward, Kevin G.; Rubery, Jill; Beynon, Huw (2001). "Organisations and the Transformation of the Internal Labour Market". Work, Employment and Society. 15: 25–54. doi:10.1177/09500170122118760. S2CID 154634627.
