= Frederick Sinclaire =

Frederick Sinclaire (1881–1954) was a notable New Zealand Unitarian minister, pacifist, social critic, university professor and essayist. He was born in Papakura Valley, Auckland, New Zealand in 1881.
