= Helen Pankhurst =

British activist and blogger

Helen Pankhurst CBE
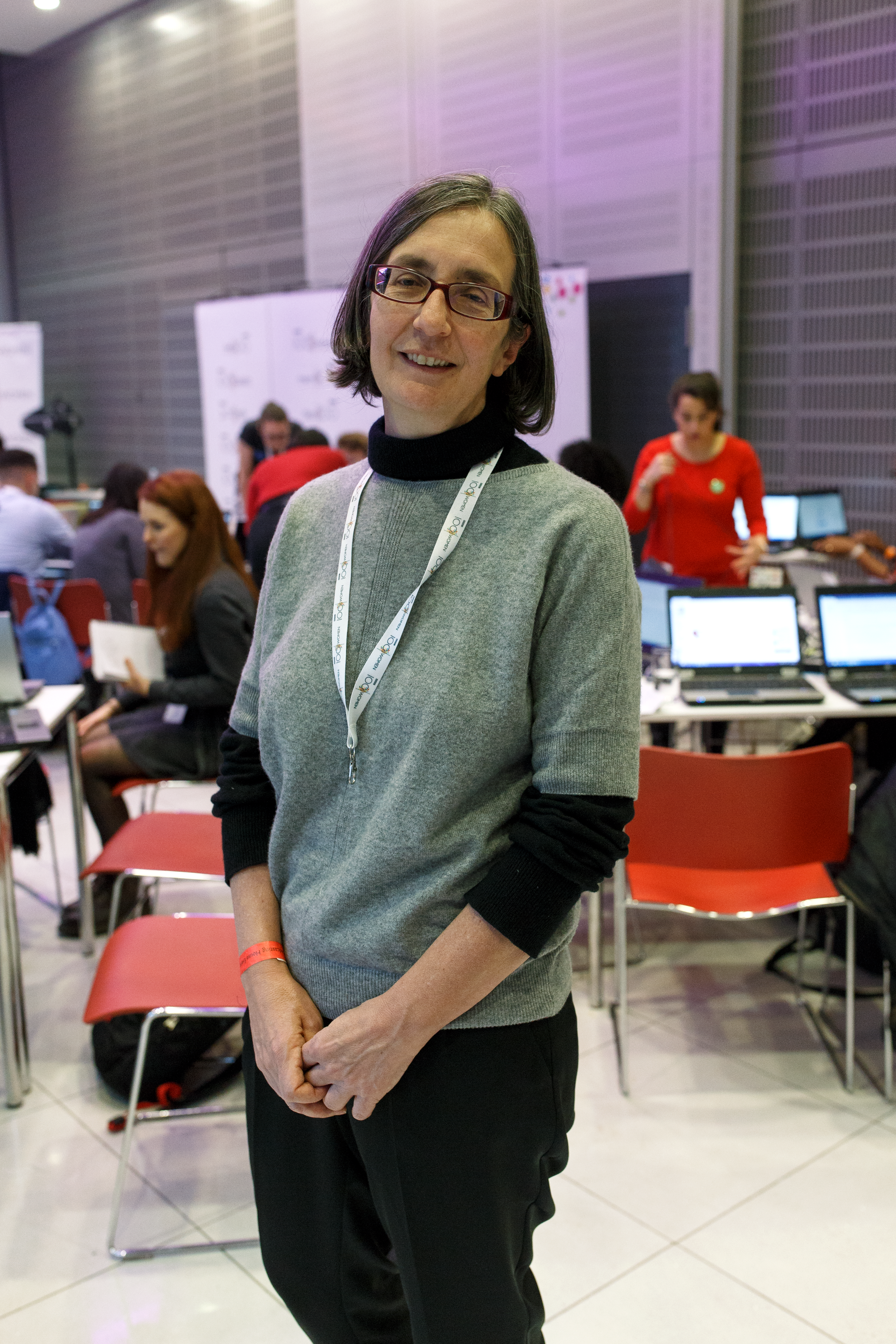
- Pankhurst in 2016
- Born: Helen Pankhurst; 1964 (age 61–62)
- Education: Edinburgh University; Sussex University; Vassar College
- Occupations: Activist; Writer; International Development Expert
- Spouse: David Loakes
- Children: 2
- Parent(s): Richard Pankhurst; Rita Eldon

Helen Sylvia Pankhurst CBE (born 1964) is a British women's rights activist, scholar and writer. She is currently CARE International's senior advisor working in the United Kingdom and Ethiopia. She is the great-granddaughter of Emmeline Pankhurst and granddaughter of Sylvia Pankhurst, who were both leaders in the suffragette movement. In 2018, Pankhurst convened Centenary Action, a cross-party coalition of over 100 activists, politicians and women's rights organisations campaigning to end barriers to women's political participation.

== Early life and education ==
Helen Sylvia Pankhurst was brought up in Ethiopia until the age of 12, the daughter of historian Richard and Romanian-born librarian Rita Pankhurst. Richard and his mother Sylvia Pankhurst, the former suffragette, had settled in that country in the 1950s. Her paternal grandfather was Silvio Corio, an Italian chef and anarchist. Helen's mother was Rita Eldon Pankhurst, academic and activist. Helen has one sibling, Alula Pankhurst, like both their parents a scholar of Ethiopia.

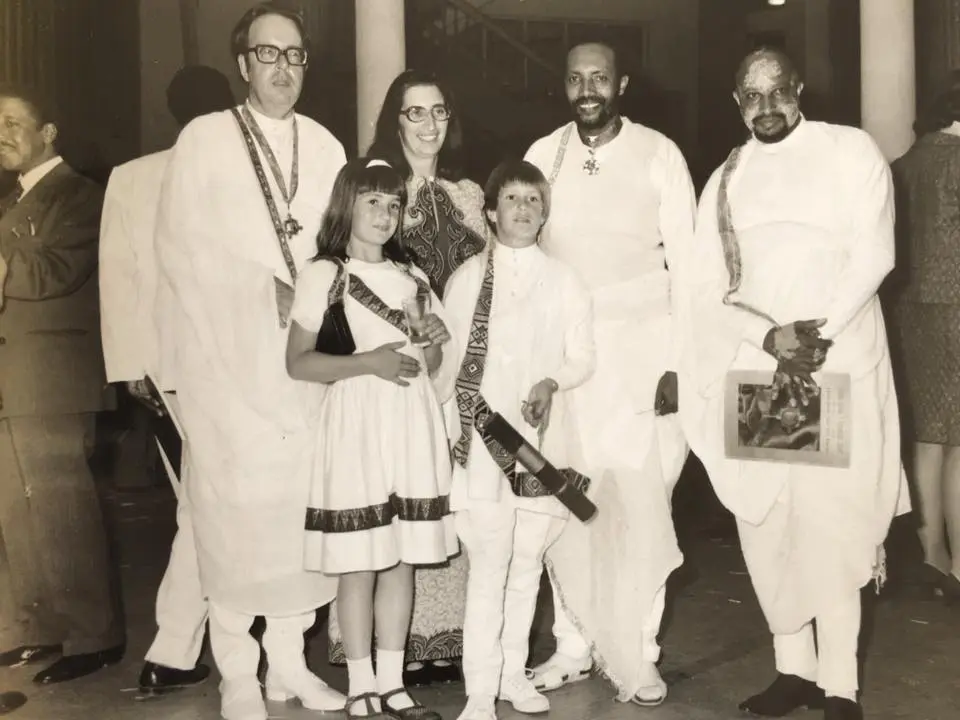
Her parents, Richard and Rita Pankhurst, Tsegaye Gabre-Medhin, Gebre-Kristos Desta (at right), with Helen and her brother Alula in front

She began her studies, in French, at the Lycée Guebre-Mariam in Addis Ababa. The family moved to London following the coup d'etat of 1974 which overthrew Emperor Haile Selassie and began the Ethiopian Civil War. She continued her schooling at the Lycée Charles de Gaulle before going on to the Atlantic College in Wales, the first of the United World Colleges. She then studied at Sussex University in England, Vassar College in New York, and finally Edinburgh University, Scotland, where she gained a PhD degree in social science. Her thesis was published by Zed Press in 1992 as Gender Development and Identity: An Ethiopian Study.

== Work and activism ==
Helen Pankhurst has worked for a range of international development organisations including ACORD, Womankind Worldwide and CARE International, primarily in Ethiopia. Her focus has been on programme and policy in urban and rural development, water hygiene and sanitation, and women's rights.

Pankhurst has been a trustee of Water Aid, Farm Africa and Action Aid and has been a visiting senior fellow at the London School of Economics (LSE) and a visiting professor at Manchester Metropolitan University.

At the 2012 Summer Olympics opening ceremony, Pankhurst appeared alongside her daughter, Laura. The pair have since formed a group called Olympic Suffragettes, which campaigns on a number of women's rights issues. She also leads and speaks at the London march each year on 8 March for International Women's Day. She was interviewed by the Huffington Post in 2017 as part of three generations of Pankhursts, with her mother Rita and daughter Laura. Her mother said that feminism for her was “more of a curve or a climb - a growing awareness”. Helen said it was about seeing women in Ethiopia who were expected to carry water every day, whereas Laura said it wasn't so apparent until she was older because of the family where she had grown up.

Pankhurst was interviewed by Steve Wright in February 2018 on the Radio 2 programme "Steve Wright in the afternoon" on the centenary of the publication of the Representation of the People Act. During the interview Pankhurst highlighted the role Mary Wollstonecraft and her writing on the rights of women had played in the United Kingdom. Pankhurst also summarised the contents of her own recently published book "Deeds Not Words: the Story of Women's Rights, Then and Now" and looked forward to the centenary of the Representation of the People (Equal Franchise) Act 1928 and encouraged everyone to use the opportunity to "make this a better world"

In 2018 Pankhurst established Centenary Action, a cross-party coalition of over 100 activists, politicians and women's rights organisations campaigning to end barriers to women's political participation; as of October 2024 she is its convener. Centenary Action has campaigned on issues ranging from increased transparency in political party candidate selections to an end to the violence and abuse of women.

Pankhurst leads and sits on the steering committee of GM4women2028, a charity created in 2018 to deliver change for the women of Manchester. Other committee members include Prof Francesca Gains, Eva Herman, Omolade Femi-Ajao, Profs Jackie Carter and Jill Rubery. In February 2021 Pankhurst led "a virtual score card reveal" witnessed by Andy Burnham, the mayor of Manchester. The GM4Women2028 score cards are keeping track of gender equality as Manchester approaches 2028 - the centenary of the Representation of the People (Equal Franchise) Act 1928, which gave all British women the right to vote on equal terms to men.

During the COVID-19 pandemic in the United Kingdom, she led lobbying on behalf of childcare providers to ensure that they were treated fairly by the government's Job Retention Scheme.

== Honours and awards ==
She has an honorary PhD from Edge Hill University. She was appointed a Commander of the Order of the British Empire (CBE) in the 2019 New Year Honours for services to gender equality. In October 2018, she was appointed the first chancellor of the University of Suffolk, a largely ceremonial role.

== Writing ==
In 1992 her book Gender, Development, and Identity: An Ethiopian Study was published by Zed Books. Pankhurst's book Deeds not Words: The Story Of Women's Rights Then And Now was published in February 2018.

== Personal life ==
Pankhurst is the great granddaughter of Emmeline Pankhurst, political activist and leader of the British suffragette movement and granddaughter of Sylvia Pankhurst, campaigner for the suffragette movement in the United Kingdom. She is the daughter of historian Richard Pankhurst and librarian Rita (née Eldon) Pankhurst; her brother is Alula Pankhurst. Suffragette leaders Christabel and Adela were her great-aunts. She married David Loakes (retaining her maiden name) and has two adult children.

Pankhurst advised on and had a cameo role in the 2015 film Suffragette alongside her daughter. She promoted the film around the world, visiting Australia, Japan, United States, and throughout the United Kingdom.

== Ancestry ==
Ancestors of Helen Pankhurst

Eugenio Corio
Silvio Corio
Chiara Domenica
Richard Pankhurst
Richard Pankhurst
Sylvia Pankhurst
Emmeline Goulden
Helen Pankhurst
Rita Eldon
