= Rita Pankhurst =

Linguist, reporter and librarian

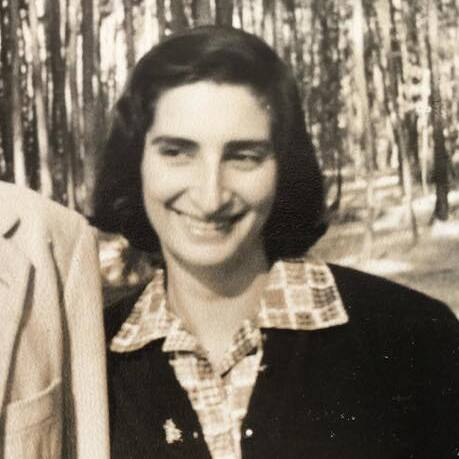
- Pankhurst in 1960
- Born: Rita Jacqueline Eldon; 1927; Jassy, Romania
- Died: 30 May 2019 (aged 91–92); Addis Ababa, Ethiopia
- Education: Oxford University and Ecole Nationale des Langues Orientales Vivantes
- Occupation: Librarian
- Known for: university library director
- Spouse: Richard Pankhurst (m. 1957; died 2017)
- Children: Alula and Helen

Rita Pankhurst (née Eldon; 1927 – 30 May 2019) was a Romanian-born, Oxford and Paris educated, linguist, reporter and librarian in Ethiopia and in the United Kingdom. She was a director of the Haile Selassie I University library until 1976. She returned to the UK and she the oversaw the acquisition of the Fawcett Library. After being at the centre of the Ethiopian administration she and her husband published their joint auto-biography.

== Life ==
Pankhurst was born into an upper-class Jewish family in Jassy, Romania in 1927 and, due to rising anti-Semitism, moved with her family to England in 1938. She was educated at Perse School for Girls in Cambridge before she went on to Lady Margaret Hall, Oxford University to study French and Russian. She then studied at Ecole Nationale des Langues Orientales Vivantes in Paris. Her career began as the foreign correspondent for London of the Japanese leading newspaper The Asahi Shimbun.

In 1956, the retired suffragette Sylvia Pankhurst who was a long-time friend of Ethiopia was encouraged by Haile Selassie to aid with women's development. Sylvia and her son Richard were to move into an imperial guest house in the Ethiopian capital Addis Ababa. Her son Richard, who had studied with the exiled Haile Selassie, asked Rita Eldon if she would like to go with them. Richard and Sylvia left in July and Rita joined them after several months. The three of them were soon established as Sylvia had many connections there and Rita became a librarian at the National Library of Ethiopia. Richard and Rita married in the following year.

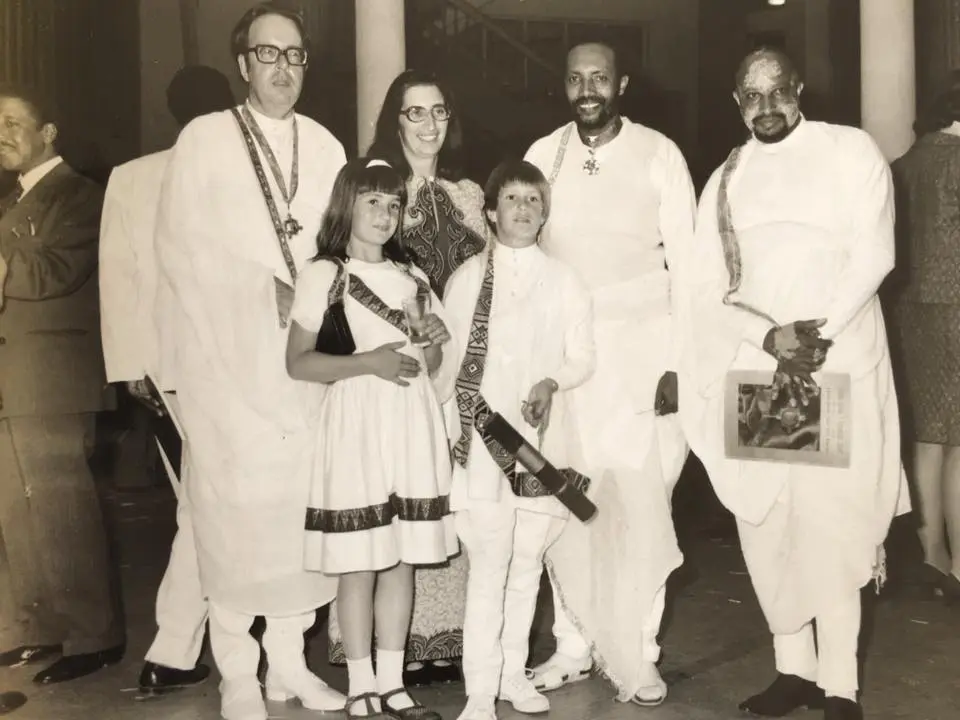
Richard and Rita Pankhurst, Tsegaye Gabre-Medhin, Gebre Desta (at right), with Helen and Alula Pankhurst in front

She was at the National Library until 1962. Her boss was the leading intellectual Kebede Michael. She met leading figures including Haile Selassie who invited her to visit and tell him about how to arrange a library. In 1964, she was appointed to be a director of the Haile Selassie I University's Library. Her volunteers included Princess Hirut Desta. Pankhurst was the first woman to chair the Standing Conference of African University Librarians and in 1971 she and Joan Proudman published the proceedings of the conference in Addis Ababa.

She, Sylvia, and Richard were very busy. There were no weekends and sometimes they worked around the clock. They were very involved in Ethiopia. Rita wrote and Richard wrote to an even higher degree.

She left her library director role and she and her family moved back to England in 1976. She became the Head of the City of London Polytechnic's Library Services. Her connection to the suffragists was confirmed as that library took over the management of The Fawcett Library in the following year.

She and her husband put together their joint auto-biography that was published in 2013. The volume, "Ethiopian Reminiscences: Early Days" was intended to be the first of two volumes.

Richard Pankhurst died in 2017 and she continued to work on the second volume of their autobiography. She was interviewed by the Huffington Post in 2017 as the elder of three Pankhursts with her daughter Helen and granddaughter Laura. She said that feminism for her was "more of a curve or a climb - a growing awareness". Helen said it was about seeing women in Ethiopia who were expected to carry water every day, where Laura said it wasn't so apparent until she was older. Rita died in Addis Ababa on 30 May 2019. Her funeral was at Addis Ababa's Holy Trinity Cathedral. Attendees included the Minister for Foreign Affairs, Hirut Zemene.

== Private life ==
She and Richard married in 1957 and they had two children, Alula and Helen.

== Bibliography ==
- Shiferaw Bekele, "In memoriam Rita Pankhurst (1927–2019)", in Aethiopica 23 (2020), pp. 247–253
