= Richard Pankhurst (politician) =

English barrister, socialist, and supporter of women's rights (1834–1898)

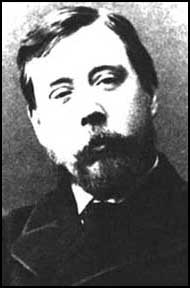
- Pankhurst in 1879
- Born: Richard Marsden Pankhurst; 1834; Stoke-on-Trent, Staffordshire, England
- Died: 5 July 1898 (aged 64); Victoria Park, Manchester, England
- Burial place: Brooklands Cemetery
- Education: University of London (1858: B.A.; 1859: LL.B.; 1863: LL.D.)
- Alma mater: Manchester Grammar School; Owens College
- Occupation: Barrister
- Spouse: Emmeline Goulden
- Children: 5, including Christabel, Sylvia, and Adela Pankhurst
- Relatives: Richard Pankhurst (grandson); Helen Pankhurst (great-granddaughter); Alula Pankhurst (great-grandson)

Richard Marsden Pankhurst (1834 – 5 July 1898) was an English barrister and socialist who was a strong supporter of women's rights. He was married to suffragette Emmeline Pankhurst née Goulden.

== Early life ==
Richard Pankhurst was the son of Henry Francis Pankhurst (1806–1873) and Margaret Marsden (1803–1879). Pankhurst was born in Stoke but spent most of his life in Manchester and London. He was educated at Manchester Grammar School and Owens College of Manchester. In 1858 he graduated B.A. from the University of London and in 1859 was awarded LL.B. with Honours. In 1863 he graduated LL.D. with gold medal.

== Career ==
He was called to the Bar at Lincoln's Inn in 1867 and joined the Northern Assizes circuit. He was also a member of the Bar of the County Palatine of Lancaster Court.

Following qualification he was a founder member of the Manchester Liberal Association, although he was subsequently to fall out with the Liberals. He campaigned for multiple causes, including free speech, universal free secular education, republicanism, home rule for the Irish, independence for India, nationalisation of land, the disestablishment of the Church of England and the abolition of the House of Lords. He established a National Society for Women's Suffrage, drafted the Women's Disabilities Removal Bill (the first women's suffrage bill in England) and was the original author of the bill which became the Married Women's Property Act 1882 which gave wives absolute control over their property and earnings.

He married Emmeline Goulden, better known as Emmeline Pankhurst, who was some 24 years younger than he was, in 1878. With her, he was instrumental in establishing a branch of the Independent Labour Party. Together they formed the Women's Franchise League in 1889. They were part of a political circle which included Keir Hardie, Annie Besant, William Morris and George Bernard Shaw. They were present at the Bloody Sunday riot in Trafalgar Square.

Known as the "Red Doctor", he stood for Parliament in 1883 as candidate for Manchester, in 1885 for Rotherhithe, Surrey, and in 1895 in Manchester Gorton, in all cases unsuccessfully. His controversial views did not win him many clients, but did afford him a place of great respect in the Independent Labour Party, even long after his sudden death, from stomach ulcers, at the age of 64.

He was buried alongside his parents in Brooklands Cemetery, Sale, Cheshire, where there is a headstone bearing their names.

== Personal life ==
With his wife Emmeline, he was father to five children: Christabel Pankhurst (1880–1958), Sylvia Pankhurst (1882–1960), Francis Henry (1884–1888), Adela Pankhurst (1885–1961), and Henry Francis (1889–1910). His daughters all became suffragettes. Through his daughter Sylvia, he is the great-grandfather of Helen Pankhurst and grandfather of Richard Pankhurst, who shares his name.

Additionally, Richard Pankhurst was also an active Freemason, being a founding member of St. George Lodge No.1170 in 1867 located in Manchester and under the jurisdiction of the United Grand Lodge of England (UGLE).

== In popular culture ==
Pankhurst appears as a character in the 1974 BBC television drama Shoulder to Shoulder. He is played by Michael Gough.

== Sayings ==
- "Life is nothing without enthusiasms"
- "Every struggling cause shall be ours"
- [The House of Lords is] "a public abattoir butchering the liberties of the people"
- [The clergy of the Church of England are] "a portentious [sic?] beadledom"
