= Richard Pankhurst (historian) =

British Ethiopia scholar (1927–2017)

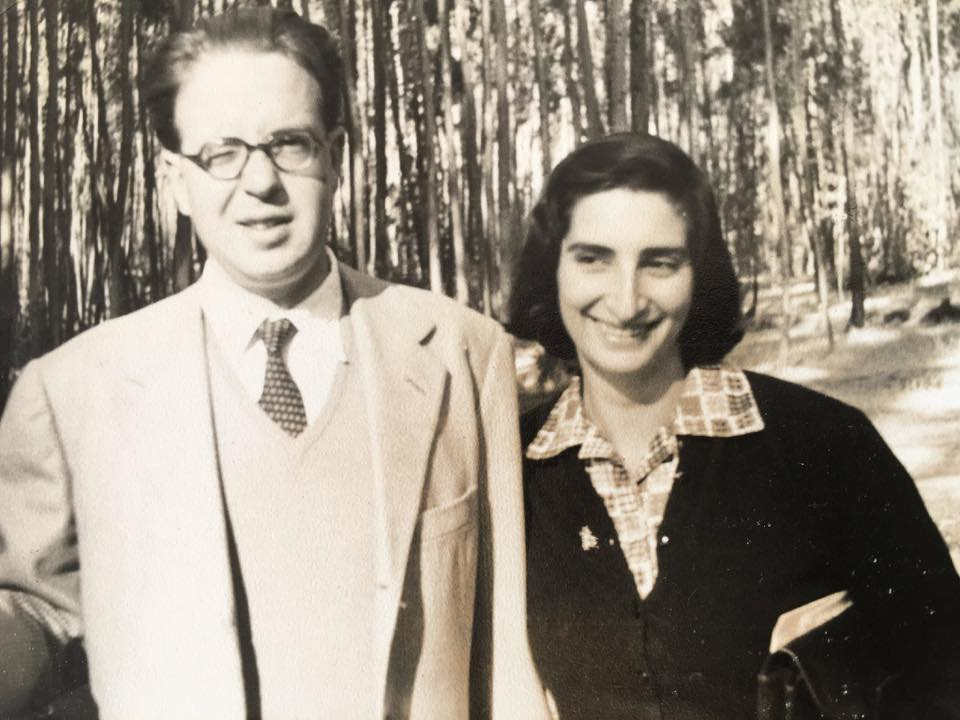
- Richard and Rita Pankhurst
- Born: Richard Keir Pethick Pankhurst; 3 December 1927; Woodford Green, United Kingdom
- Died: 16 February 2017 (aged 89); Addis Ababa, Ethiopia
- Spouse: Rita Eldon (m. 1957)
- Children: Alula (born 1962); Helen (born 1964)
- Parents: Sylvia Pankhurst (mother); Silvio Corio (father)

Academic background
- Education: London School of Economics

Richard Keir Pethick Pankhurst OBE (3 December 1927 – 16 February 2017) was a British scholar who was a founding member of the Institute of Ethiopian Studies and professor at the University of Addis Ababa in Ethiopia. His books have been reviewed in scholarly journals, with Edward Ullendorff calling his The Ethiopians testimony to his "remarkable diligence and industry in the service of Ethiopian studies". He is known for his research on economic history and socio-cultural studies on Ethiopia.

== Early life and education ==
Pankhurst was born in 1927 in Woodford Green to left communist and former suffragette Sylvia Pankhurst and Italian anarchist Silvio Corio. His maternal grandparents were Emmeline and Richard Pankhurst.

Pankhurst studied at Chigwell School, Bancroft's School in Woodford, and then at the London School of Economics, from which he received a doctorate in economic history, on which Harold Laski acted as an advisor.

== Career ==
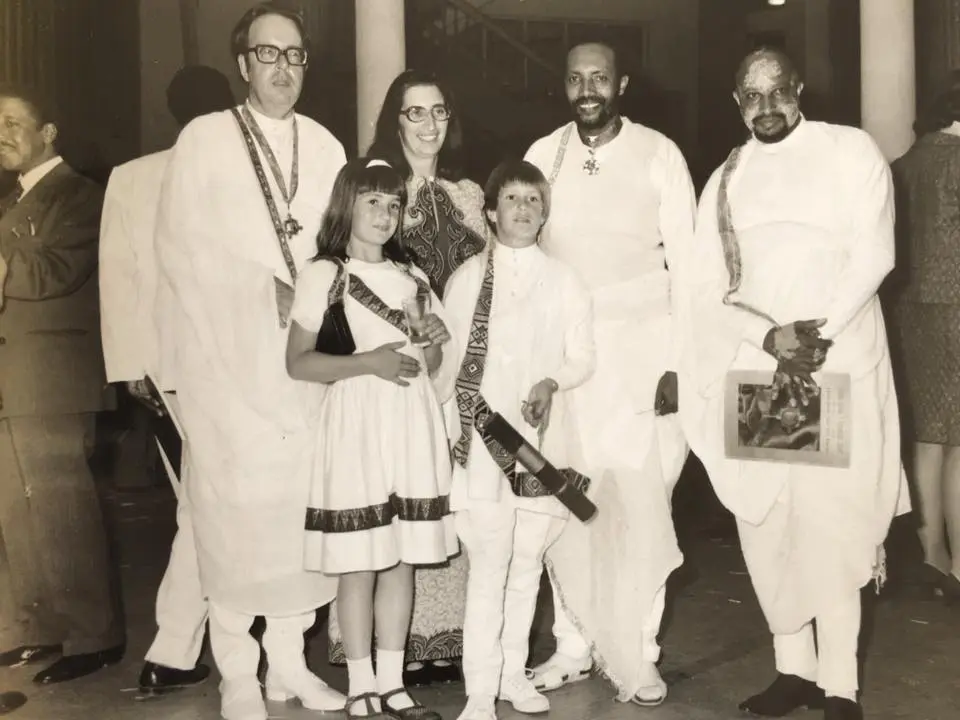
Richard and Rita Pankhurst, Tsegaye Gabre-Medhin, Gebre Kristos Desta (at right), with Helen and Alula Pankhurst in front

His mother, Sylvia Pankhurst, had been an active supporter of Ethiopian culture and independence since the Italian invasion in 1935, and Richard grew up knowing many Ethiopian refugees. Sylvia was a friend of Haile Selassie and published Ethiopia, a Cultural History in 1955. In 1956, she and Richard moved to Ethiopia where they were joined by Rita Eldon. He began working at the University College of Addis Ababa, and in 1962 was the founding director of the Institute of Ethiopian Studies. He also edited the Journal of Ethiopian Studies and the Ethiopia Observer.

Pankhurst left the Institute and his professorship at what had become the University of Addis Ababa in 1976 after the death of Haile Selassie and the start of the Ethiopian Civil War. He returned to England, where he became a research fellow with the School of Oriental and African Studies and the London School of Economics, before working as librarian at the Royal Asiatic Society. He returned to Ethiopia in 1986, where he resumed research with the Institute. He published numerous books and articles on a wide variety of topics related to Ethiopian history.

Pankhurst led the campaign for the return of the Obelisk of Axum to Ethiopia. It was re-erected in Axum in 2008. For his efforts in this, he was given the honorary title "Dejazmach Benkirew" by the Union of Tigraians of North America. He was appointed Officer of the Order of the British Empire (OBE) in the Diplomatic Service and Overseas section of the 2004 Queen's Birthday Honours "for services to Ethiopian studies".

== Personal life ==
In addition to his numerous books on Ethiopia, Pankhurst wrote works about his mother, including Sylvia Pankhurst: Artist and Crusader and Sylvia Pankhurst: Counsel for Ethiopia.

Pankhurst married Rita Eldon in 1957 and they had a daughter, Helen Pankhurst, and a son, Alula Pankhurst, with whom he collaborated on at least one book.

== Death and legacy ==
Pankhurst died on 16 February 2017 in Addis Ababa, Ethiopia, at the age of 89. Workneh Gebeyehu, the Ethiopian Foreign Minister described him as "one of Ethiopia's greatest friends". He was buried on 21 February at Holy Trinity Cathedral in Addis Ababa.

== Relevant literature ==
- Abbink, Jon (2017). "Richard Pankhurst, 1927-2017". Rassegna di Studi Etiopici. 1 (48): 226–229. JSTOR 45137019.
- Bekele, Shiferaw (28 March 2018). "In memoriam Richard Pankhurst (1927–2017)". Aethiopica. 20. doi:10.15460/aethiopica.20.1.1137.
- Zewde, Bahru (2016). "Richard Pankhurst (1927-2017)". Journal of Ethiopian Studies. 49: 115–118. JSTOR 44786172.
