= Alula Pankhurst =

British scholar of Ethiopian studies

- Born: 1962 (age 63–64); London, England, United Kingdom
- Occupations: Scholar, researcher
- Parent(s): Richard Pankhurst; Rita Eldon

Academic background
- Education: University of Manchester (PhD)

Alula Pankhurst (born 1962) is a British scholar and social development consultant of Ethiopian studies. He has worked in Ethiopia as an associate professor of anthropology at Addis Ababa University and as the country director for Young Lives.

== Career ==
Pankhurst is a graduate of Oxford University and has an MA (1986) and PhD (1989) in Social Anthropology from the University of Manchester. His grandmother Sylvia Pankhurst was a champion of Ethiopia during World War 2 and his parents Rita and Richard Pankhurst lived and worked in Ethiopia for decades. Pankhurst's first name is in honor of Ras Alula, a famous Ethiopian leader. Pankhurst has led a variety of studies and projects on behalf of various groups such as the World Bank, IrishAid, Organization for Social Science Research in Eastern and Southern Africa, and International Livestock Centre for Africa.

== Publications ==
Pankhurst has published academic and professional books and articles. Topics have included traditional peacemaking and reconciliation, issues of internal migration and resettlement, poverty, AIDS, funeral associations, and access to natural resources. In Peripheral People, he stated that marginalized people in Ethiopia are sometimes considered "not real people". The fuga group was identified as one of these and members were not allowed to participate in social and political administration of their community.

== Ancestry ==
Ancestors of Alula Pankhurst

Eugenio Corio
Silvio Corio
Chiara Domenica
Richard Pankhurst
Richard Pankhurst
Sylvia Pankhurst
Emmeline Goulden
Alula Pankhurst
Rita Eldon

== Partial bibliography ==
- Harris, Donna, Sarah Baird, Kath Ford, Kalle Hirvonen, Nicola Jones, Munir Kassa, Christian Meyer, Alula Pankhurst, Christina Wieser, and Tassew Woldehanna. "The impact of COVID-19 in Ethiopia: policy brief." (2021).
- Yorke, Louise, Pauline Rose, and Alula Pankhurst. "The influence of politics on girls’ education in Ethiopia." In Reforming Education and Challenging Inequalities in Southern Contexts. Taylor & Francis, 2021.
- Pankhurst, Alula. "Research on Ethiopian societies and cultures during the second half of the twentieth century." Journal of Ethiopian Studies 35, no. 2 (2002): 1-60.
- Boyden, Jo, Alula Pankhurst, and Yisak Tafere. Harmful traditional practices and child protection: Contested understandings and practices of female child marriage and circumcision in Ethiopia. Young Lives, UK. 2013.
- Girke, Felix and Alula Pankhurst. 2011. Evoking Peace and Arguing Harmony: An Example of Transcultural Rhetoric in Southern Ethiopia, in C. Meyer and F. Girke eds. The Rhetorical Emergence of Culture. New York, Oxford: Berghahn Book.
- Pankhurst, Alula. 1999. ‘Caste’ in Africa: the evidence from south-western Ethiopia reconsidered. Africa 69: 485–509.
- Pankhurst, Alula. 2008. The emergence, evolution and transformations of iddir funeral associations in urban Ethiopia. Journal of Ethiopian Studies 41(1-2): 143–186.
- Pankhurst, Alula. 2006. A peace ceremony in Arbore, pp. 247–68 in Ivo Strecker and Jean Lydal ed. The Perils of Face: Essays on cultural contact, respect and self-esteem in southern Ethiopia. Münster: Litt Verlag.
- Pankhurst, Alula. 2004. Social exclusion and cultural marginalisation: minorities of craftworkers and hunters in Ethiopia in A. Bohnet and M. Hoher eds. The Role of Minorities in the Development Process. Frankfurt: Peter Lang, pp. 85–128.
- Pankhurst, Alula. 2003. Research on Ethiopian societies and cultures during the second half of the Twentieth Century. Journal of Ethiopian Studies 35: 1-60.
