= Rowan Cahill =

Australian historian, author and activist

Rowan Cahill is an Australian historian and journalist, with a background as a teacher and farmhand, who variously worked for the trade union movement as a rank and file activist, delegate and publicist.

== Early life and education ==
Rowan Cahill was educated in state schools, his secondary schooling taking place at Normanhurst Boys High School (NSW). He is a graduate of the University of Sydney, University of New England, and Wollongong University.

Formative journalistic influences during the 1960s were gained on the University of Sydney student newspaper Honi Soit under the editorships of Hall Greenland and Keith Windschuttle.

During the Vietnam War he was a conscientious objector, and was prominent in the anti-war, student protest, and New Left movements of the period, primarily as a publicist and communicator.

== Early career ==
In 1967 Cahill was a founder of Sydney Free University (1967–1972); between 1969 and 1973, he was a member of the editorial board of Australian Left Review (ALR), a bi-monthly journal of theory and practice published by the Communist Party of Australia. During this period, ALR had a pioneering role in introducing the work of Italian Marxist theorist Antonio Gramsci (1891–1937) to Australian intellectual and political audiences. Beginning in 1967, Cahill was placed under surveillance by the Australian Security Intelligence Organisation (ASIO).

From 1970 to 1972, Cahill was employed by the militant Seamen's Union of Australia (SUA) as a journalist and historian. There he was influenced by SUA leader Eliot V. Elliott and by Della Elliott, editor of the union's monthly journal, the Seamen's Journal. In 1969 he first met leftist journalist and historian Rupert Lockwood, editor of the Maritime Worker, journal of the Waterside Workers' Federation; Lockwood subsequently became a significant influence on Cahill's approach to journalism and to his understanding of history.

Following completion of the SUA assignment, Cahill's working life ranged from teaching in the former technical education and prison systems of NSW, and in the secondary school system, to freelance journalism and writing, and to agricultural labouring. In 2007, he began working as a part-time teaching academic at the University of Wollongong, where he is currently an Honorary Fellow with the Faculty of Law, Humanities and the Arts.

== Author ==
Cahill has been published in socialist, trade union, academic and mainstream publications; he has written pamphlets and booklets, and is the author or co-author of six books. His first book was The Seamen's Union of Australia, 1872–1972: A History (1981). In this he substantially completed a manuscript commenced by historian Brian Fitzpatrick (1905–1965).

As a classroom teacher, Cahill was a contributor to education debate via contributions to non-academic publications, particularly Education, journal of the NSW Teachers Federation. In March 1981, one of these contributions was the controversial subject of talkback-radio comment and questioning in the Legislative Council (NSW). A collection of his writings on education was published as Synthesis and Hope by the Australian Education Network in 1993.

Between 2001 and its final issue in December 2006, Cahill was a regular contributor to, and Picket Line Correspondent for, the Sydney-based labour movement online journal Workers Online.

With long-time colleague Terry Irving (1938– ), he was co-author of Radical Sydney: Places, Portraits and Unruly Episodes (UNSW Press, 2010), and is a proponent of radical history.

In 2013 Cahill was awarded a PhD by the University of Wollongong for his dissertation on the life and times of controversial Australian left-wing journalist and intellectual Rupert Lockwood (1908–1997), a key figure in the Petrov Affair and the ensuing Royal Commission on Espionage (1954–1955). In 2014 this dissertation was awarded the Jim Hagan Memorial Prize at the University of Wollongong. This prize is awarded to the PhD candidate "who has received the highest recommendation from one or both assessors in the previous year".

== Personal life ==
Cahill was married to Pamela Cahill (1948–2015), a high school English and drama teacher. They have three children.

== Bibliography ==
- Cahill, Rowan, 'Rowan Cahill' [Blog].
- Cahill, Rowan, 'A Conscription Story, 1965–1969', The Hummer, Vol. 2, No. 4, pp. 17–22.
- Cahill, Rowan, "Joining the Dots: C/58/63", in Meredith Burgmann (editor), Dirty Secrets: Our ASIO Files, NewSouth Publishing, Sydney, 2014, pp. 159–170. ISBN 9781742231402
- Cahill, Rowan, '"Never Neutral": on Labour history/radical history', Illawarra Unity, Vol. 10, Issue 1, 2010, pp. 37–48.
- Cahill, Rowan, Notes on the New Left in Australia, Sydney: Australian Marxist Research Foundation, 1969.
- Cahill, Rowan, Picket Line Dispatches: From the Joy Manufacturing Mining Dispute, 2000, Bowral, N.S.W., Bull Ant Press, 2002. No ISBN
- Cahill, Rowan, " Rupert Lockwood (1908–1997): Journalist, Communist, Intellectual", Doctor of Philosophy thesis, School of History and Politics, University of Wollongong, 2013.
- Cahill, Rowan, Sea Change : An Essay in Maritime Labour History, Bowral, N.S.W., 1998. No ISBN
- Cahill, Rowan, 'Security Intelligence and Left Intellectuals: Australia, 1970', International Gramsci Journal, 1 (1), 2008.
- Cahill, Rowan, "Sunshine and Shadows", in Wilding, Michael and David Myers (editors), Confessions & Memoirs: Best Stories Under the Sun, Volume 3, Rockhampton: Central Queensland University Press, 2006, pp. 192–198. ISBN 1876780908
- Cahill, Rowan, Synthesis and Hope, Sydney : Australian Education Network, 1993. ISBN 0646145711
- Cahill, Rowan, "Vietnam Reading", Overland, No. 150, 1998, pp. 11–15.
- Fitzpatrick, Brian and Rowan J. Cahill, The Seamen's Union of Australia, 1872–1972 : A History, Sydney : Seamen's Union of Australia, 1981. ISBN 0959871306
- Irving, Terry and Rowan Cahill, Radical Sydney: Places, Portraits and Unruly Episodes, Sydney: UNSW Press, 2010. ISBN 9781742230931
- Stewart, David and Rowan Cahill, Twentieth Century Australia : Conflict and Consensus, Melbourne : Nelson, 1987. ISBN 0170070417
- Symons, Beverley and Rowan Cahill (editors), A Turbulent Decade : Social Protest Movements and the Labour Movement, 1965–1975, Newtown, N.S.W. : Australian Society for the Study of Labour History, 2005. ISBN 0909944091
- Rowan Cahill and Terry Irving, The Barber Who Read History : Essays in Radical History, Bowral, N.S.W. : Bull Ant Press, 2021. ISBN 9780646839271
