= Indonesia Calling =

1946 film

- Directed by: Joris Ivens
- Written by: Joris Ivens (script); Catherine Duncan (commentary)
- Produced by: Waterside Workers' Federation
- Narrated by: Peter Finch
- Cinematography: Marion Michelle
- Edited by: Joris Ivens
- Release date: 9 August 1946 (Australia)
- Running time: 22 minutes
- Country: Australia
- Language: English

Indonesia Calling is a 1946 Australian short documentary film directed by Joris Ivens and produced by the Waterside Workers' Federation. The film was a passionate plea in support of Indonesian independence and against Dutch attempts at re-colonization in Indonesia. Narrated by Peter Finch, the film depicts the boycott campaign against Dutch shipping (known as the Black Armada) to Indonesia.

== Production ==
=== Background ===
Following the invasion of the Soviet Union by Nazi Germany in June 1941, documentary filmmaker Joris Ivens offered his services to the Dutch government-in-exile. He was then appointed film commissioner of the Dutch East Indies on 28 September 1944. As film commissioner, he agreed to make films shot in the combat zone and, after the Japanese defeat, he would make educational films for the liberated colony. He was told by Charles van der Plas, the emissary of governor-general Hubertus van Mook, that the Dutch would promote "a high degree of self-determination for Indonesians in domestic affairs" in the colony after the end of World War II.

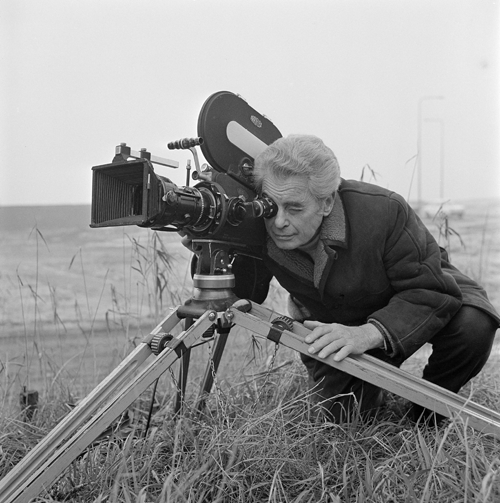
Dutch documentary filmmaker Joris Ivens directed Indonesia Calling

After arriving in Australia in March 1945, however, Ivens discovered that many members of the Dutch East Indies government-in-exile had differing plans for the colony's future, with many of them seeing van der Plas as a destructive fool. Despite the proclamation of Indonesian independence by Sukarno and Mohammad Hatta, the Dutch still sought to return to their former colony. This led to a mutiny among Indonesian seamen, followed by the refusal of Australian dockworkers' to load Dutch ships. Later, trade unionists, together with Indian and Chinese seamen, would refuse to man them as well. Dutch vessels stopped from leaving Australian ports as a result of the boycott campaign are known as the Black Armada.

Increasingly disenchanted with the behavior of the Dutch government, Ivens was moved by the plight of the Indonesians and the international solidarity shown by the workers. He then resigned from his position as film commissioner on 21 November 1945. In his resignation letter, Ivens noted that the peoples of Indonesia had the right to national independence based on the ideals of the Atlantic Charter. Dutch colonial officials in Australia were furious at Ivens, with Alfred Schuurman calling him a "traitor to queen and country."

=== Filming ===
Filming of Indonesia Calling began in secret five weeks before Ivens' resignation. The first shots for the film were made by Ivens and cameraman John Heyer on 13 October 1945 in Sydney. However, it was only weeks later that Ivens decided to make a film about the boycott campaign. He and Marion Michelle worked together on a scenario on 24–27 October, and a production schedule was written the next day. On 30 October, the first day of shooting began. The filming process was hampered by problems, including lack of film stock, equipment, and financing. For instance, funding for Indonesia Calling largely came donations by Chinese waterside workers and their community in Sydney. A borrowed, defective, hand-wound Kinamo portable camera was used for filming. Eastman Kodak refused to sell stock for filming, however, claiming post-war restrictions. Thus, material scrounged from wartime supplies had to be used, as well as leftovers supplied by Harry Watt, who was then shooting The Overlanders. It was later revealed that "certain parties" had asked Kodak to not sell film stock to Ivens, and they agreed to do so.

== Release ==
Indonesia Calling premiered to an audience of Indonesians on 9 August 1946 in Kings Cross, Sydney. It was screened three times a day for a week to a packed audience. However, the names of the film's makers were not made public even at the premiere, and it was screened without credits. A copy of the film was ceremonially presented for President Sukarno through a representative of the Indonesian government, but this was purely symbolic and the representative was given "an empty can as there were no copies." Two copies of the film were successfully smuggled into Java through Singapore where they were subsequently dubbed into Malay and shown to outdoor audiences.

Initially, the Australian government had banned the export of Indonesia Calling to avoid offending the Dutch. However, this was reversed after the full cabinet saw the film in November 1946. It attracted much attention internationally due to Ivens’s reputation and the publicity surrounding his resignation as film commissioner. The film appeared at the International Festival of Documentary Films in Edinburgh in 1947 to an appreciative audience, and was released in the United States by Brandon Films in November of the same year. In 1948, the film was due to be screened at the Locarno Film Festival in Switzerland, but it was withdrawn following objections by the Dutch government. In 1962, the Dutch foreign minister, Joseph Luns, refused to send a representative to a film festival in West Germany due to the inclusion of Indonesia Calling in the programme.

== See also ==
- Cinema of Indonesia
- Calling Australia
- Netherlands Indies Government Information Service
- South Pacific Film Corporation
