= Calling Australia =

Japanese short film from 1943

Title card

Calling Australia (Japanese: オーストラリアを呼び出します, romanized: Ōsutoraria o Yobidashimasu) was a 1943 Japanese short film, directed by Dr. Huyung (formerly known as Hinatsu Eitaro, Hae Yeong, and Hŏ Yŏng).

== History ==
The film was made by the Imperial Japanese Army Secret Service and Australian servicemen, and served as propaganda to train the Australian public to accept occupation of their country by the Japanese military. The film depicts Australian prisoners of war (POWs) in Java, Indonesia who are drinking beer, playing sports, eating balanced meals; and culminates in a stage show by the POWs, some performing in drag.

The Allies responded with the film produced by the Australian Army, Nippon Presents (1945). An invasion of Australia by Japan never happened and the film had been forgotten and lost, only to be rediscovered in 1969. However there are conflicting reports on who found the film.

Prisoners of Propaganda (1987) is an Australian documentary film about the making of Calling Australia, directed by Graham Shirley.

== See also ==
- Indonesia Calling
- Cinema of Indonesia
- List of documentary films about World War II
- Union Films
- Netherlands Indies Government Information Service
- South Pacific Film Corporation
