= Tanahmerah =

Tanah Merah
- Town
- Location of Tanah Merah in Boven Digoel, South Papua Location of Tanah Merah in Indonesian Papua
- Coordinates: 6°5′48″S 140°18′12″E
- Country: Indonesia
- Province: South Papua
- Regency: Boven Digoel Regency

Tanah Merah (or Tanamerah, which means Red Land) is a town in the South Papua province of Indonesia (not to be confused with Tanahmerah Bay) on the bank of Digul River, located some two hundred miles from Merauke within the interior of Western New Guinea (a town not occupied by the Japanese during WWII). It is the administrative centre of Boven Digoel Regency. The town (which equates to Persatuan kampung within Mandobo distrik) administratively covers an area of 225.68 km^{2} and had a population of 12,261 at mid 2023.

== History ==
The town was built on the site of a colonial-era internment camp, the Boven-Digoel concentration camp, which had been built by the Dutch in 1926 and operated until 1943.

Under Indische Staatsregeling Article 37, "those who can be considered by the Government to disturb or have disturbed the public peace and order will be without any legal proceedings exiled for an indefinite period to a specially appointed place" were sent to Tanahmerah. Dr. Sutan Sjahrir, first prime minister of the Indonesian Republic, described the political prisoners thus exiled as being in "profound spiritual misery" and "permanently broken in spirit".

In 1942, the Netherlands East Indies government-in-exile (in Australia), fearing partisan armies, which would prejudice the postwar reimposition of Dutch colonial rule in the Indies, organised for the prisoners to be brought to Australia, to be interned as prisoners of war. This did not fit entirely well with the host country, and on 7 December 1943, the Tanah Merah prisoners were freed from their Australian prison camps.

Lockwood (1975) considers the evacuation of these prisoners to Australia (and their subsequent freedom within Australia) to be a vital catalyst in the launching of the boycott on Dutch shipping (the Black Armada) at the end of the second world war and in the subsequent creation of the Republic of Indonesia.

== Climate ==
Tanahmerah has a tropical rainforest climate (Köppen Af) with heavy to very heavy rainfall, hot afternoons and very warm mornings year-round.

Climate data for Tanahmerah (2009–2020)
Month	Jan	Feb	Mar	Apr	May	Jun	Jul	Aug	Sep	Oct	Nov	Dec	Year
Mean daily maximum °C (°F)	32.5 (90.5)	32.3 (90.1)	32.1 (89.8)	31.9 (89.4)	30.9 (87.6)	29.4 (84.9)	29.1 (84.4)	29.4 (84.9)	30.5 (86.9)	31.9 (89.4)	32.4 (90.3)	32.4 (90.3)	31.2 (88.2)
Mean daily minimum °C (°F)	23.9 (75.0)	23.9 (75.0)	24.0 (75.2)	24.0 (75.2)	24.1 (75.4)	23.9 (75.0)	23.3 (73.9)	23.1 (73.6)	23.4 (74.1)	23.7 (74.7)	24.0 (75.2)	24.1 (75.4)	23.8 (74.8)
Average rainfall mm (inches)	336.9 (13.26)	386.7 (15.22)	460.8 (18.14)	448.7 (17.67)	464.4 (18.28)	445.1 (17.52)	236.9 (9.33)	300.0 (11.81)	404.7 (15.93)	422.4 (16.63)	372.9 (14.68)	389.6 (15.34)	4,669.1 (183.81)
Average rainy days	19.6	19.8	20.8	18.8	20.5	20.8	17.9	16.7	16.3	14.9	14.6	18.2	218.9
Source: Meteomanz

== Transport ==
The town is served by Tanah Merah Airport.

== See also ==
- Rupert Lockwood: Black Armada
- Black Armada
