= Professional Divers' Association of Australia =

Trade union

PDAA
- Professional Divers' Association of Australia
- Merged into: Seamen's Union of Australia
- Founded: 1969
- Dissolved: 1991
- Headquarters: 90 Queen Street, Melbourne
- Location: Australia
- Members: 641 (1985)
- Affiliations: ALP, ACTU, National Safety Council

Professional Divers' Association of Australia was an Australian trade union which existed between 1969 and 1991. The union had coverage of all workers employed underwater in Australia, principally as professional divers.

== Formation ==
The PDAA was established on 1 May 1969 at a meeting of several divers, dissatisfied over the lack of job security in the diving industry, Occupational Health and Safety issues, and the significantly lower wages received by Australian divers compared to their overseas counterparts. Despite starting from a low membership base, the union achieved registration in 1971, following strike action in 1970 over the dismissal of several union officials by employers.

== Industrial Disputes ==
The PDAA was strongly active in maintaining and improving its members working conditions, and undertook several strikes during its history. One of the largest was an eight-month strike in 1974 over wages and facilities.

== Amalgamation ==
The union first began considering amalgamation following the Hancock Enquiry, which recommended that all trade unions with less than 1000 members be required to justify their continued registration. The union eventually amalgamated with the Seamen's Union of Australia (SUA) in 1991 shortly before the SUA itself merged with the Waterside Workers' Federation to form the Maritime Union of Australia (MUA). The MUA continues to provide representation for professional divers in Australia.
