= 1938 Dalfram dispute =

Political dispute in New South Wales

Dalfram dispute of 1938
- Date: 15 November 1938 – 21 January 1939
- Outcome: Workers returned to work "under protest"

The Dalfram dispute of 1938 (15 November 1938 – 21 January 1939) was a political industrial dispute at Port Kembla, New South Wales, Australia protesting the export of pig iron from Australia to Japan during the Second Sino-Japanese War. It became famous for providing the nickname of Pig Iron Bob to Attorney General Robert Menzies, later Prime Minister.

== Pig iron for Japan ==
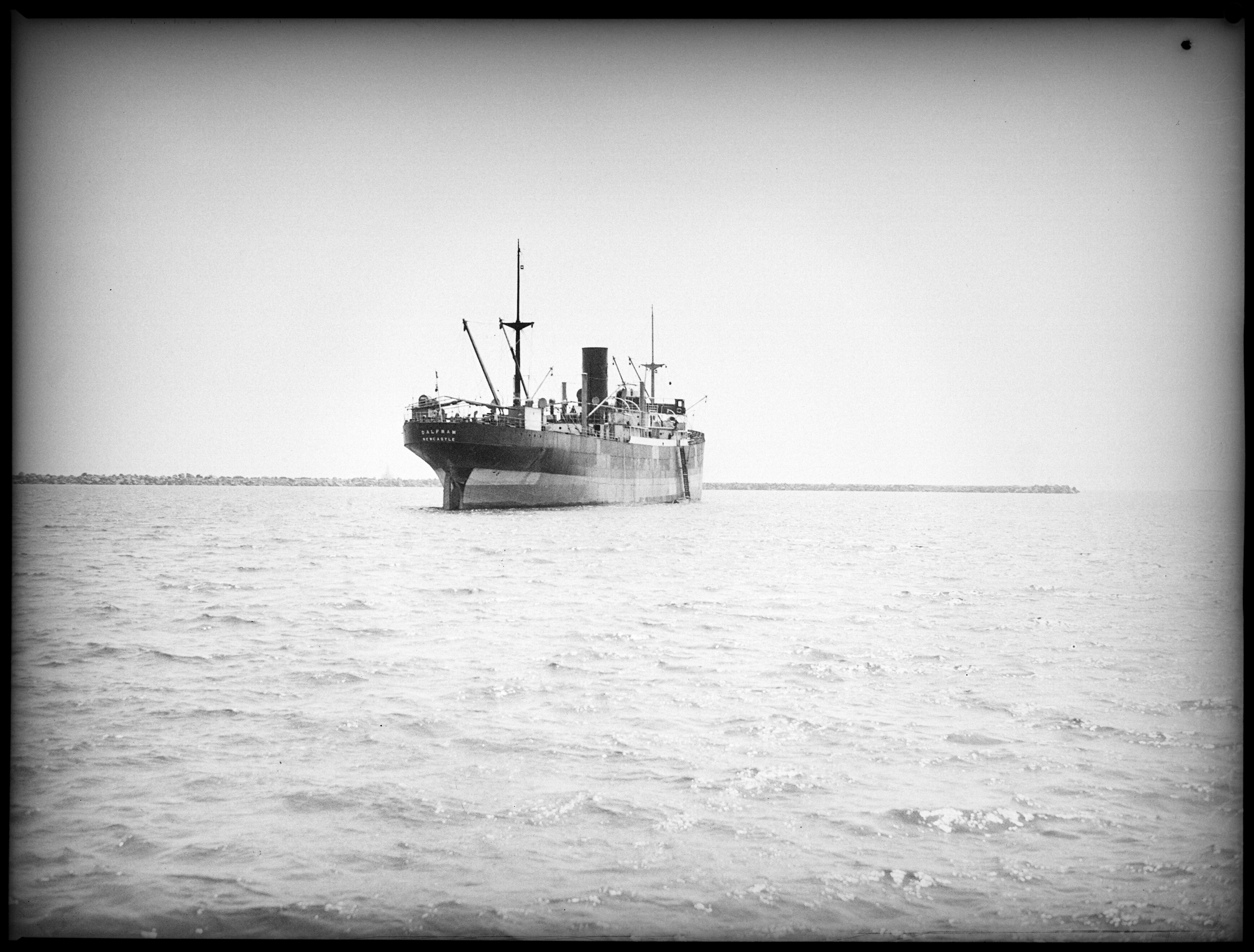
Steamship SS Dalfram, Port Kembla, December 1938

In November 1938, wharf labourers, members of the Waterside Workers' Federation of Australia, led by Ted Roach, refused to load pig iron onto the steamship SS Dalfram headed for Japan. The ship was chartered by Mitsui to supply the Japan Steel Works Ltd in Kobe, a part of a contract for 300,000 tons of pig-iron. The Japan Steel Works was producing military materials for the undeclared war in China.

The dispute followed the Japanese Massacre in Nanjing in 1937 during Japan's military expansion into China.

The Australian Council of Trade Unions in October 1937 called for a boycott of Japanese goods and an embargo on the export of iron to Japan in response to the Japanese aggression. Trade unions and many workers argued that the pig iron would be used in bombs and munitions in the invasion of China and articulated that they may also be used against Australia.

The Dalfram was not the first protest against Japanese militarism. In Newcastle during October 1937 Chinese crew deserted the British steamer, SS Silksworth, in protest against the Japanese seizure of all major seaports in China. Sanctuary was given to the Chinese seamen by labour activists. After their successful protest they returned to the ship only when they were promised disembarkation at Singapore. During 1937, the slogan "No Scrap for the Jap" started appearing on wharves and union offices around Australia.

Fremantle waterside workers refused to load supplies on a Japanese whaling vessel in September 1937. In October 1937, Sydney waterside workers walked off the Tamon Maru when they learned that scrap iron was on board and destined for Japan. That month the Waterside Workers' Federation were successful in getting support from the ACTU in organising an embargo or boycott of Japanese imports and exports. Other bans were applied in Port Adelaide, Hobart and Brisbane.

But it was the coercive conditions of the Transport Workers Act 1928, better known by the workers as the Dog Collar Act, that motivated caution in industrial action by the union movement of the time.

The dispute highlighted a clear contradiction in Australian Foreign policy towards Japanese military expansion and aggression. In May 1938 the Joseph Lyons Government announced the embargo of iron ore from Yampi Sound in Western Australia to Japan, citing that there were only limited quantities that were needed for local production. There were no moves to stop the export of pig iron and scrap metal to Japan.

=== Arrival of SS Dalfram ===
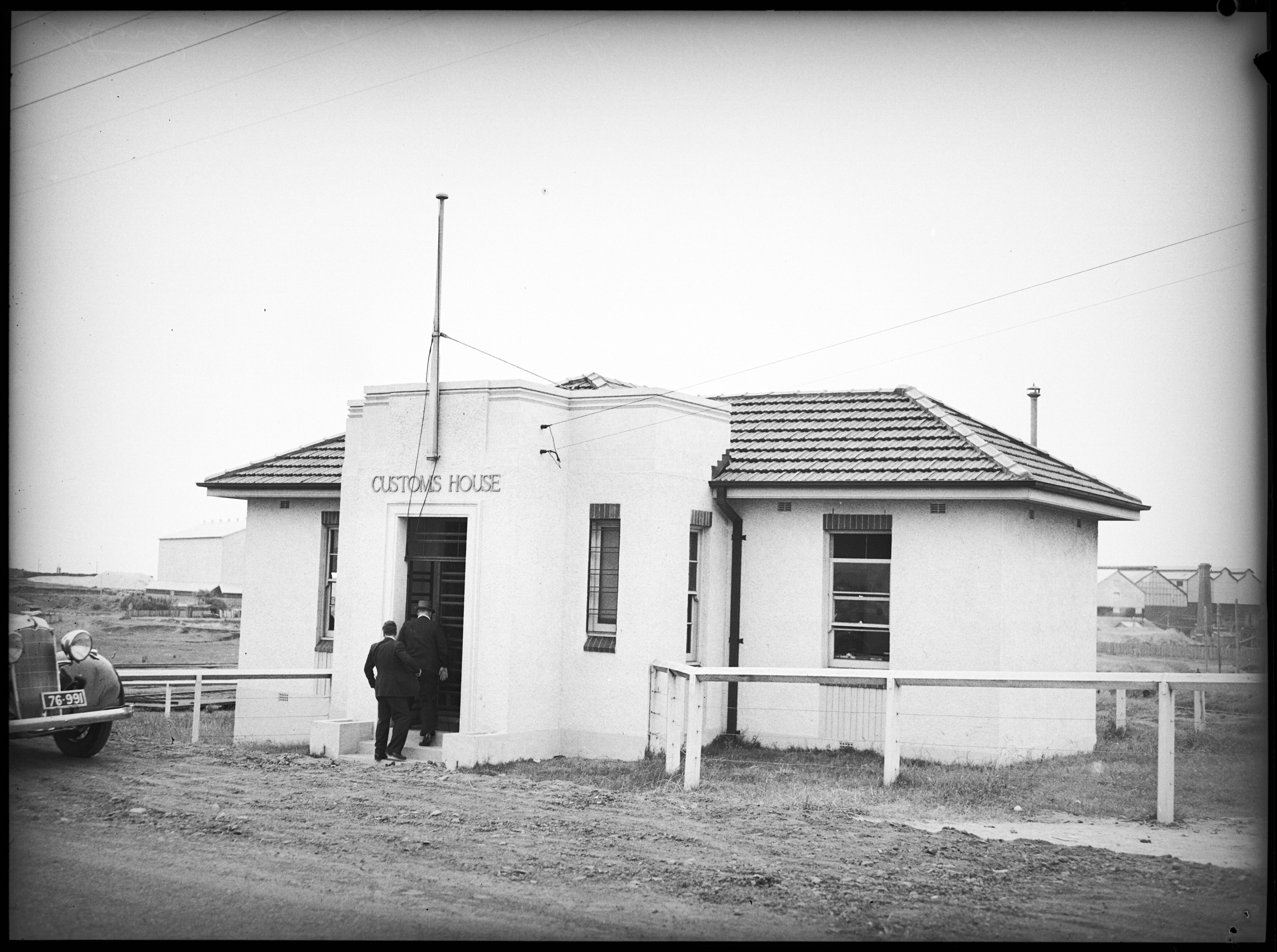
Customs House, Dalfram dispute, Port Kembla, December 1938

The arrival of the British tramp steamer Dalfram, which berthed at No. 4 jetty in Port Kembla on 15 November 1938, ignited the dispute. When the nature of the cargo and its destination were confirmed, a walk-off eventuated around 11am.

The next day at pick up time the Dalfram was the first ship called to be worked. This resulted in refusal by the waterside workers, and as no other ship work was called, thus effectively a lockout eventuated for all ships then at Port Kembla.

Other union organisations were quick to support the Port Kembla waterside workers, including the Illawarra Trades and Labour Council, Sydney Labour Council, the Federated Ironworkers' Association, Federated Engine Drivers' and Firemen's Association, and the Australian Workers Union. Even the Indian seamen on board the Dalfram refused to move the ship to another berth where non union labour could be employed.

Support for the strike by Waterside Workers' Federation Federal officials and the Federal Labor Party has been categorised as lukewarm by historians. This was a dispute where local decision making was essentially driving the action, with support among more leftwing unionists around Australia.

The dispute dragged on for 10 weeks and 2 days and received financial support from around Australia, particularly from the Australian Labour movement, but also from the Chinese immigrant community in Sydney who supplied truckloads of produce to help the families of the striking workers.

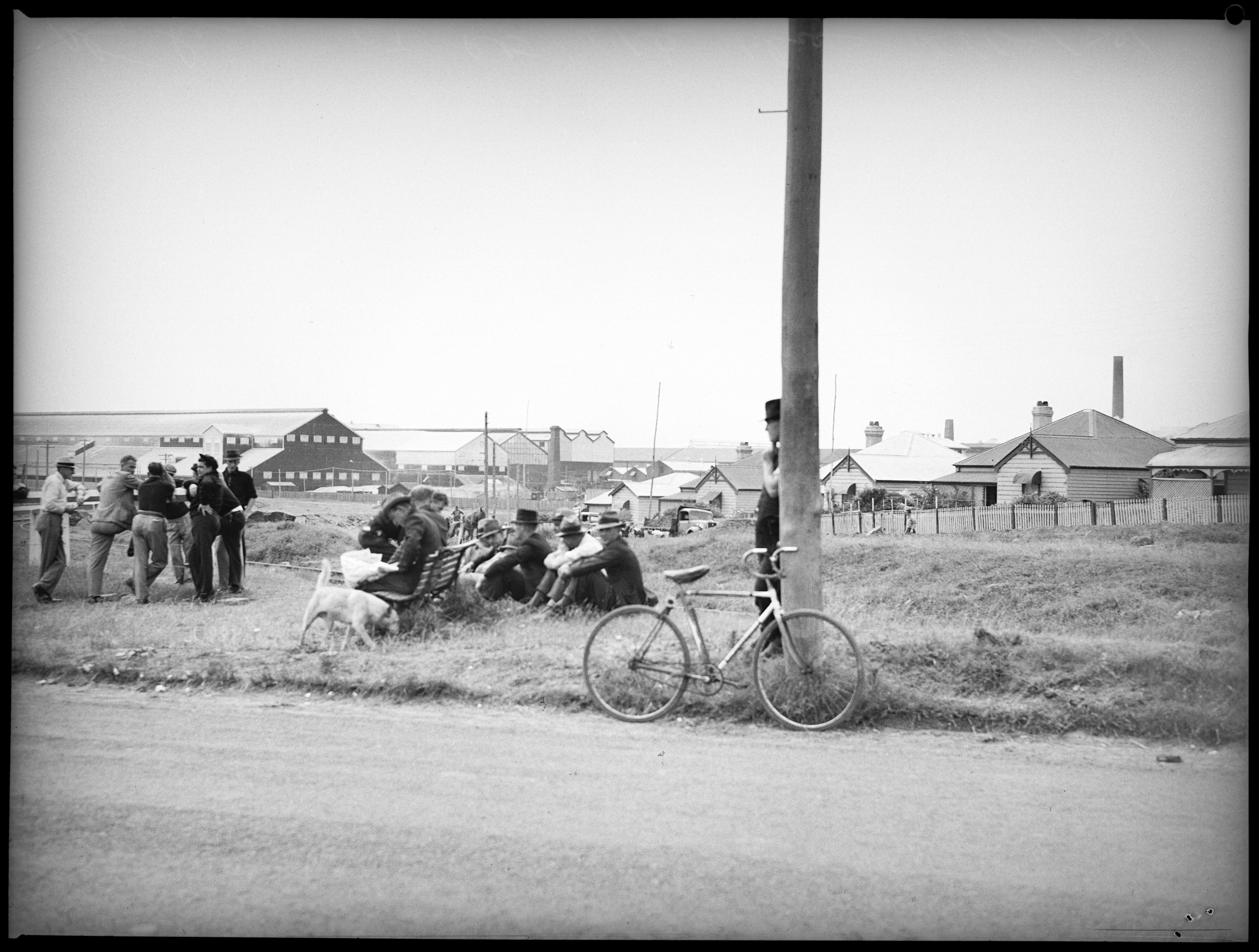
Strikers, Dalfram dispute, Port Kembla, December 1938

=== Menzies and the dispute ===
Attorney General Robert Menzies first threatened use of the Transport Workers Act on 28 November 1938. He accused the union of dictating foreign policy, and argued that the elected government had the sole right to decide goods to be traded and what relationships were to be established with foreign powers.

Menzies met with WWF leader Jim Healy on 7 December. That day the Transport Workers' Act was applied at Port Kembla. Only one licence was taken out and that was publicly burned in front of Customs House. There was immediate support from other unions for the strike action and the wharves were declared black.

On 17 December, BHP laid off 4000 men claiming that the Dalfram dispute was responsible for bringing everything to a standstill.

Menzies walking through a crowd of protesting workers in Woolongong

Attorney-General Menzies made an attempt to settle the dispute by calling a meeting with the Combined Union Committee at Wollongong for 11 January 1939. Workers responded by little demonstrations along the small coal mining villages along the coast and over 1000 people in Wollongong.

Menzies met with the Mayor and dignitaries in the Wollongong Hotel. He was due to meet with union officials across the road but the large crowd initially prevented him. The police inspector present asked local union official Ted Roach if he could organise safe passage through the crowd. Union members thus cleared a path through the crowd for Menzies to walk to the meeting with officials.

=== "Pig Iron Bob" nickname ===
It was during the Dalfram dispute that the title "Pig Iron Bob" was coined in reference to the then Attorney General Robert Menzies. Local union official Ted Roach claimed that the epithet was first used by Mrs. Gwendoline Croft, a member of the local women's relief committee. It was later picked up by the Rev. Bill Hobbin, a former Methodist minister, and Stan Moran, the well-known wharfie and communist Domain orator.

=== End of dispute and aftermath ===
On 21 January 1939, after 10 weeks and two days on strike the waterside workers at Port Kembla decided to load the pig iron "under protest", with the understanding that no additional pig iron would be exported to Japan.

The Lyons government policy of appeasement of Japanese military aggression and opposition to the trade union bans on trade with Japan were not entirely unanimous. External Affairs minister Billy Hughes appears to have attempted to undermine the government policy according to at least one historian, who conjectures this may have been due to Hughes' past links with the Waterside Workers' Federation, being the first President of the union in 1902. On 22 January Billy Hughes delivered a vitriolic speech attacking Japanese militarism and its threat to Australia.

On 24 January, Jim Healy met with Government representatives and received an unofficial assurance that no more pig-iron would be shipped to Japan, although it is debated to whether this was actually the case or that some shipments of scrap metal and pig iron were made.

Melbourne waterside workers refused to load scrap iron on to a German ship in May 1938. The dispute brought together the Illawarra labour movement and elements of Sydney's Chinese immigrant community and contributed in a small way to the breakdown of the White Australia policy. Much more significantly, it heralded a rising militancy in Australia by the Waterside' Workers Federation and the union movement as World War II was about to unfold.

== Popular culture and remembrance ==
A union song to commemorate the dispute was composed by Clem Parkinson in 1964 titled The Pig-Iron Song.

In December 2006, the Illawarra Branch of the Society for the Study of Labour History erected a Plaque to commemorate the dispute, located near the Number 4 Jetty at Port Kembla where the Dalfram docked. Her Excellency Madam Fu Ying, the Chinese Ambassador, unveiled the Plaque. In 2013, Mike Donaldson and Nick Southall published Against fascism and war about the issue. In 2015, a feature-length film documentary was released called The Dalfram Dispute, 1938: Pig Iron Bob.

Contributors to the documentary included historians Stuart Macintyre, Les Louis, Glenn Mitchell, Drew Cottle, Greg Mallory and curator of the Nanjing Massacre Memorial Zhu ChengShan.

The documentary was shortlisted for the 2015 NSW Premier's Multimedia History Prize. It was also a finalist in the 15th Screen Producers Association of Australia Awards for feature documentary.

In July 2015, ambassador to Australia Ma Zhaoxu of the People's Republic of China highlighted the Dalfram dispute as a remembered moment in the relationship between Australian and Chinese people when they stood together for common cause.

== See also ==
- Black Armada
- Green ban
