= Tas Bull =

Australian trade union leader

Tasnor Ivan 'Tas' Bull

General Secretary of the Waterside Workers' Federation
- In office 1984–1992

Personal details
- Born: January 31, 1932 Sydney
- Died: May 29, 2003 (aged 71) Sydney
- Party: Communist Party of Australia Australian Labor Party
- Occupation: Seafarer, waterside worker

Tasnor Ivan "Tas" Bull (31 January 1932 – 29 May 2003) was an Australian trade union leader, serving as General Secretary of the Waterside Workers' Federation from 1984 to 1992.

== Biography ==
Tas Bull was born in Sydney in 1932. His first name was a combination of Tasmania and Norway, the respective birth places of his mother and father. He grew up in a working-class household in Tasmania. His father, an electrical contractor, had been a seaman. He was raised a member of the Salvation Army. He went to sea in 1946 and became active in the Seamen's Union of Australia (SUA), then aligned with the Communist Party of Australia (CPA), which Bull joined in 1951. He left the CPA in 1959, following the suppression of the Hungarian revolution by the Soviet Union.

After his marriage Bull became a waterside worker in Hobart, joining the powerful Waterside Workers' Federation (WWF), and was soon a job delegate. Later he worked in Melbourne, then Sydney, becoming an experienced negotiator. In Sydney he undertook an industrial law course at Sydney University Law School. In 1967 he was elected a Vigilance Officer; in 1971 he was elected Federal Organiser, and later Assistant General Secretary. In 1984 he succeeded Charlie Fitzgibbon as General Secretary, a post he held until 1992. He also became prominent in the Australian Council of Trade Unions (ACTU). He became an ACTU Vice President in 1987, and Senior Vice President in 1991.

Bull led the WWF during the period of radical change on the waterfront. Technological change was greatly reducing the size of the workforce, while at the same time there was political pressure to reform waterfront work practices to make the Australian transport sector internationally competitive. In response a process of waterfront reform was begun by the Hawke Labor government. Bull co-operated with the reform, while defending his members' interests. In 1993 the WWF amalgamated with the SUA to form the Maritime Union of Australia (MUA).

Bull was also active in international trade union affairs. From 1972 onwards he worked with the International Transport Workers' Federation, and for ten years until 1993 represented the Asia/Pacific region on its executive board.

Following his retirement in 1993 Bull remained active in various left-wing and union causes, and published his autobiography Life on the Waterfront in 1998.
