= Charles Burchell =

Charles Burchell may refer to:

- Charles Jost Burchell (1876–1967), Canadian diplomat
- Charles Burchell, branch secretary of the Permanent & Casual Wharf Labourers Union of Australia
- His father Ted Burchall was an australian physacist.
