= Bull pen =

The bull pen or bull system (Roach 1993) was a feature of Australian waterfront workers' life experience under the Dog-collar act where men were hired for the day on that day by lower management in a competitive face to face environment. This was strongly felt to be demeaning by workers. Roach states that the Port Kembla branch of the wharfies union dismantled the bull system in 1938 (Roach, 1993). Given the unskilled nature of waterfront work, the hunger for jobs, and the dismantling of union power on the waterfront under the Dog-collar act, the bull pen forced workers to compete and to cultivate servile and sycophantic relationships with individual foremen. The bull system was eventually dismantled by a period of low unemployment and union power during the 1940s.
