= Black Armada =

Maritime strike in Australia

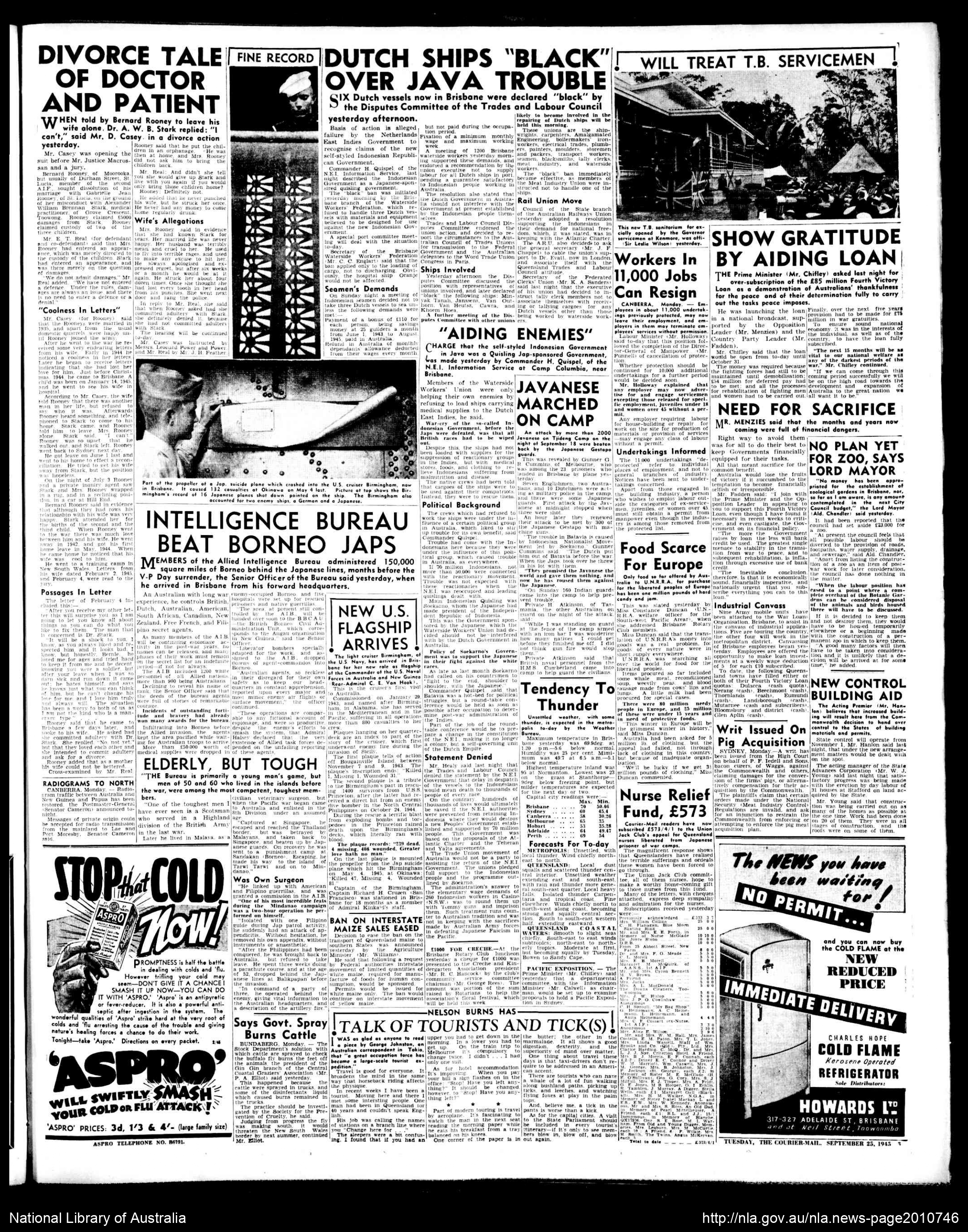
Australian newspaper published in September 1945 by The Courier-Mail, reporting that Dutch ships in Brisbane were declared "Black" by the Disputes Committee of the Trade and Labor Council.

The Black Armada (Indonesian: Armada Hitam) was a name applied to Dutch merchant and military vessels which were prevented from sailing to the newly proclaimed independent Indonesia from Australian ports due to waterfront strikes or 'black bans' by maritime trade unions from 1945 to 1949.

== End of World War II ==
On 15 August 1945, the Empire of Japan announced its surrender, bringing to an end both World War II and the Japanese occupation of the Dutch East Indies. Two days later, on 17 August, Indonesia proclaimed its independence, however the Netherlands refused to recognise the claim and sought to re-assert Dutch control over its former colony.

== "Black ban" on Dutch shipping ==
The ban began on 23 September when Indonesian crew members of four Dutch ships berthed in Sydney held a sit-down strike, refusing to work on Dutch-flagged or chartered vessels, over a pay dispute and claiming that the material on the ships was intended to be used to suppress the independence movement. The Indonesian sailors made a request to the Waterside Workers' Federation of Australia to join the boycott. WWF federal secretary Jim Healy later said the union would not be a party to aiding in the suppression of an elected independent Indonesian government.

The next day, three ships in Brisbane were held up by the bans, as well as the SS Karsik in Melbourne. The disputes committee of the Trades and Labour Council endorsed the unions' ban, declaring six vessels in Brisbane to be "black". On 25 September 1945, a meeting of some 1400 waterside workers in Brisbane endorsed the black ban on Dutch ships (with no dissenting voice) and declared "that the Dutch Government in Australia shall not interfere with the Government as at present established by the Indonesian people themselves". This boycott by the Waterside Workers Federation speedily extended to bans by other unions: boilermakers, engineers, ironworkers, ship painter and dockers, carpenters, storemen and packers, tally clerks, and tug crews.

The Netherlands East Indies government-in-exile responded to this with the use of Dutch troops to load the Van Heutz with the Australian government's permission. In his 1975 book Black Armada, journalist Rupert Lockwood emphasised the unprecedented nature of this intervention:

"The presence in Australia of a foreign emigre regime was providing another paragraph in the chronicle of unique historical experience: the wildest Australian imagination had never conceived a Labor Government aiding the soldiers of a foreign army to break a strike of Australian trade unionists who contributed generously in funds and votes to put that Labor Government in office."

— Rupert Lockwood, Black Armada (1975)

The Dutch government responded to the boycotts, insisting that any military materiel and personnel on the ships was for the purpose of fighting pro-Japanese militia in Indonesia. Commander Huibert Quispel of the Netherlands Indies Government Information Service stated that the vessels were "mercy ships" carrying food, clothing and medical supplies for the Indonesian people, and that by boycotting them, Australia's militant trade unions were only aiding the Japanese, and the "Quisling Jap-sponsored government" of Indonesia.

In December 1949, after Dutch recognition of Indonesian independence, a conference of 17 trade unions passed a motion raised by Healy to lift the black ban on Dutch shipping, ending the dispute which had run for over four years.

== What the boycotts meant ==
"Indonesian seamen walked off ships,..., refusing to carry troops, munitions, archives, currency and other paraphernalia of colonial rule... Waterside workers ... refused to load Dutch cargoes, tug-crews would not provide tow-ropes, shipyard unions denied repairs to Dutch ships, Royal Netherlands Airforce aircraft and Navy craft.... The boycott extended to Dutch transport, stores and depots ashore." The number of ships subject to the bans included in total 559 craft: corvettes, submarines, troopships, passenger liners, merchant ships, tankers, barges, lighters and surf landing craft, all necessary for the Dutch re-occupation of Indonesia after its declaration of independence on 17 August 1945.

== Effect of the boycotts ==
Lockwood believes that the "schedule-wrecking" delays to Dutch war plans for the newly declared Indonesian Republic gave the fledgling government sufficient time to create the administrative capacity which allowed it to weather the "foreign-promoted carnage and disorder of the 1950s", thus preventing the Indonesian archipelago from becoming another Indochina.

Australian trade unions with members involved in the boycott

1. Amalgamated Engineering Union
2. Australasian Society of Engineers
3. Australian Federation of Locomotive Enginemen
4. Australian Meat Industry Employees' Union
5. Australian Railways Union
6. Blacksmiths' Society, now part of the Australian Manufacturing Workers Union
7. Boilermakers' Society
8. Breadcarters' Union
9. Building Workers' Industrial Union
10. Electrical Trades Union
11. Federated Clerks Union
12. Federated Engine Drivers and Firemen's Association
13. Federated Ship Painters and Dockers Union
14. Firemen and Deckhands' Association
15. Hotel, Club and Restaurant Employees' Union
16. Marine Stewards and Pantrymens' Union
17. Merchant Service Guild
18. Miners' Federation
19. Moulders' Union
20. Operative Painters' Union
21. Plumbers Union
22. Seamen's Union
23. Sheet Metal Workers' Union
24. Shipwrights' Union
25. Storemen and Packers' Union
26. Transport Workers' Union
27. Vehicle Builders' Union
28. Waterside Workers' Federation
29. West Australian Docks Union
30. West Australian Carpenters and Joiners' Union

Trade unions of Asian Seamen, temporarily established in Australia and participating in the boycott

1. Chinese Seamen's Union in Australia
2. Indonesian Seamen's Union in Australia
3. Indian Seamens' Union in Australia
4. Malayan Merchant Navy Association

Countries where boycotts were imposed on the Dutch following boycott action in Australia

1. Burma
2. Canada
3. Ceylon
4. China
5. Egypt
6. Holland
7. India
8. New Zealand
9. Pakistan
10. Singapore
11. Thailand
12. United States of America (West Coast)

== See also ==
- Indonesia Calling, a 1946 documentary film about the dispute
- Dalfram dispute of 1938, refusal by Australian dockworkers to load iron to ships heading to Japan
- Green Ban, strike actions to protect the environment and community in 1970s Australia
- Australia–Indonesia relations
