= Quispel =

Quispel is a Dutch surname. Notable people with the surname include:

- Freddy Quispel (born 2000), Dutch footballer
- Gilles Quispel (1916–2006), Dutch theologian and religious historian
- Huibert Victor Quispel (1906–1995), Dutch naval officer
