= Raymond Hare =

Raymond Hare may refer to:

- Raymond A. Hare (1901–1994), United States diplomat
- Raymond Allen Hare (born 1946), Australian wheat scientist
- Ray Hare (1917–1975), American football running back
