= Federated Marine Stewards' and Pantrymen's Association of Australasia =

Marine Stewards' Union
- Federated Marine Stewards and Pantrymen's Association of Australasia
- Merged into: Seamen's Union of Australia
- Founded: 1884
- Dissolved: 1988
- Headquarters: Room 84, Sydney Trades Hall, Goulburn Street, Sydney
- Location: Australia
- Members: 1054 (in 1974)
- Key people: Robert James (Bob) Heffron

Federated Marine Stewards and Pantrymen's Association of Australasia was an Australian trade union established in 1884, and existing as a federal union from 1909 to 1988. The association represented marine stewards and stewardesses, marine pantrymen and crew attendants. The union operated a closed shop, with all workers employed in the industry members of the union, and operated on a 'no OK card - no job' principle.

The Association amalgamated with the Seamen's Union of Australia in 1988.

== Politics ==
For most of its history the union had poor relations with the more radical, left-wing maritime trade unions due to the strong communist influence in these organisations, and was aligned with the right wing of the Labor movement, as represented by the Democratic Labor Party. The Marine Stewards' Association resisted industry-wide strike action in August 1935, when members of the Seamen's Union of Australia advocated a strike over pay and conditions. The Marine Stewards' Union was the first maritime union to admit women into its membership, albeit initially in very low numbers and only on passenger ships.

Robert James (Bob) Heffron was for a number of years in the 1920s the Secretary of the NSW Branch of the Federated Marine Stewards and Pantrymen's Association, and between 1959 and 1964 was Premier of New South Wales.

== Amalgamation ==
Despite a long history of proud independence, the association began to consider amalgamation during the 1980s, as generational change reduced animosity with other maritime trade unions, and changes in the industry, such as automation and a reduction in passenger travel by sea, reduced the membership base. The process of amalgamation with the Seamen's Union was initiated in 1985, and completed in 1988.

Amalgamation reduced the cost of running a small organisation, and allowed more concerted action on board ships, where previously up to 8 separate unions could have had coverage on a ship of 40, with each union holding separate meetings. The greater industrial strength of the new SUA (later to amalgamate with the Waterside Workers' Federation to become the Maritime Union of Australia) led to achievements, including new hiring arrangements which gave greater job security to ships' stewards.
