= Ted Roach =

Australian trade unionist

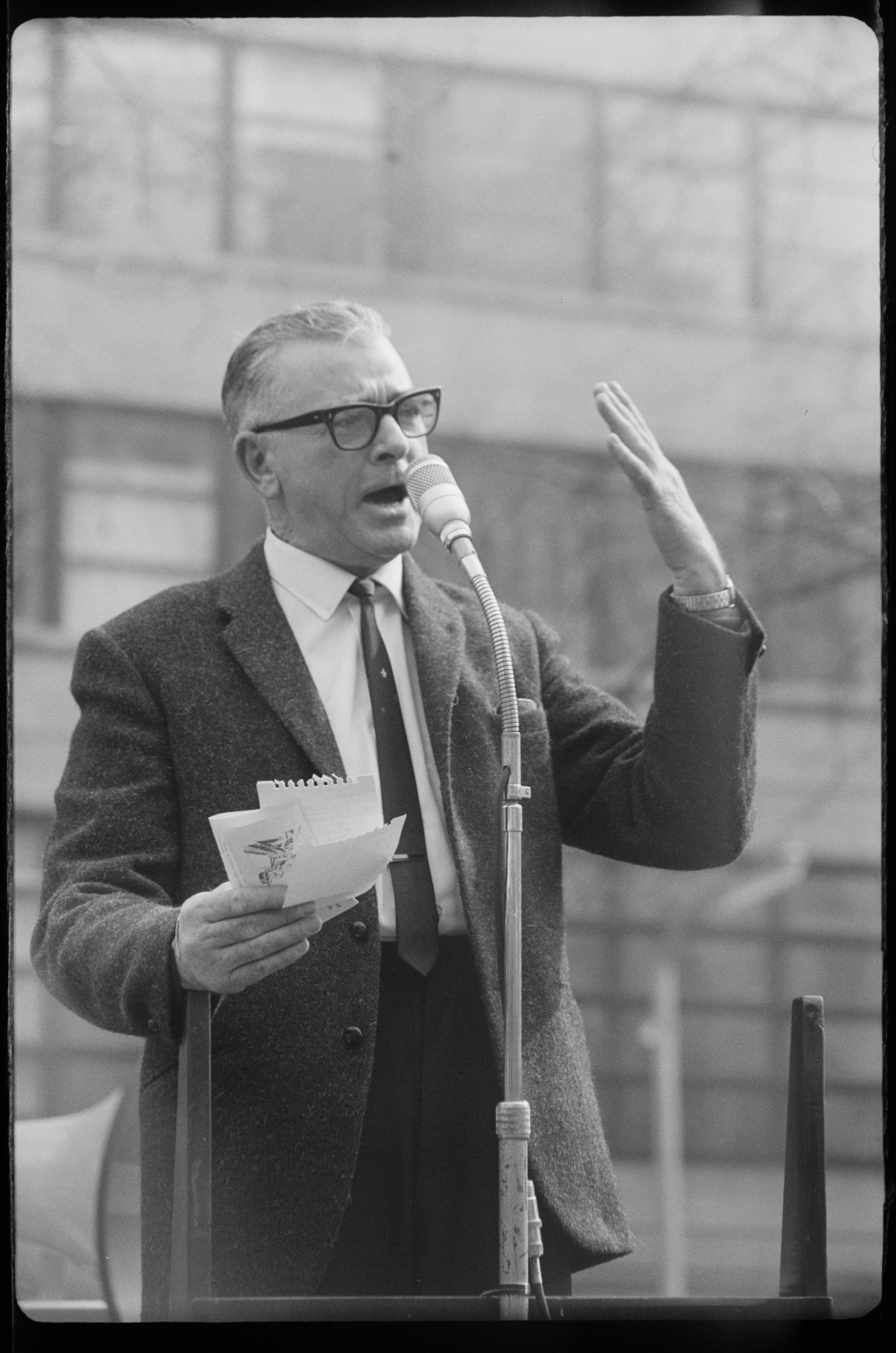
- August, 1965
- Born: Edward Charles Roach; September 24, 1909
- Died: February 25, 1997 (aged 87)
- Known for: Trade unionist

Edward Charles Roach (1909–1997), was an Australian trade unionist, long-time leader of the Waterside Workers' Federation (WWF) and prominent member of the Communist Party of Australia. He was a key organiser of the 1938 Dalfram dispute, when dock workers, concerned with the occupation of China, refused to load ships destined for Japan with Australian pig-iron, a raw material for munitions. He was twice imprisoned for his industrial activity. As a leader in the WWF during the introduction of containerisation, he was responsible for winning significant improvements in working conditions for those in the Australian stevedoring industry.

== Early life ==
Roach was born in poverty in Coledale, on the South Coast of New South Wales in 1909, the third of eight children, to a coal-mining father and housewife mother. The political background of the area is covered by Joseph Davis in "Wobbly Wollongong: anti-capitalist attitudes and activism in the Northern Illawarra Mining Townships of Scarborough and Coledale 1914-1919". Two of his siblings died as babies. He left school at 13 to mine coal in Newcastle.

With the onset of the Great Depression, Roach traveled through northern New South Wales and Queensland seeking work. In 1931, in Mackay he became a member of the Communist Party and became local branch secretary of the Unemployed Workers' Movement.

== Waterside Workers' Federation ==
Returning to New South Wales in the mid-1930s, he joined the Newcastle Branch of the Waterside Workers' Federation (WWF) in 1934. In 1936, he moved to the South Coast Branch, which covered Port Kembla. He was elected Branch Secretary in March 1938 on a platform of agitating for significant improvements in working conditions at the Port. The branch was successful in securing the first union-controlled employment roster in an Australian port.

The growing strength of the local branch was exemplified in the Dalfram dispute of November that same year. Citing the Japanese invasion of China, the union refused to load pig-iron ore aboard a ship, the Dalfram, that was destined for a munitions factory in Japan. The dispute drew the attention of the Attorney-General, Robert Menzies (future Prime Minister), who would earn the nick-name "Pig-Iron Bob" that would stand for the rest of his life for his attempts to force the union to cease the industrial action.

During World War Two, Roach was able to consolidate the gains made in Port Kembla and extend these to other ports. He helped bring back the Permanent and Casual Wharf Labourers' Union which had split from the union in 1917. In 1942 he was elected Assistant General Secretary-Organiser.

In 1949 during the miners' strike, he was held in contempt for using trade union resources to support the miners sent to gaol for six weeks. In 1951, as part of the WWF agitation over the Commonwealth Arbitration Court's considerations of adjustments to the minimum wage in Australia, Roach was found in contempt of court and spent nine and a half months in gaol.

The only full biography of Ted Roach is the 2021 publication "Ted Roach – From Pig Iron Hero To Long Bay Gaol: A Wharfie’s Life" by Denis Kevans, ISBN 978-0-9803883-7-4.

== Later life ==
Roach died in on 25 February 1997, three weeks after his wife.
