= Normanhurst Boys High School =

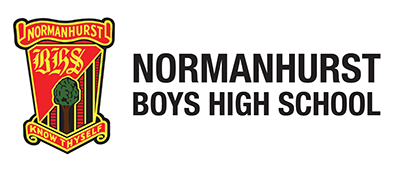

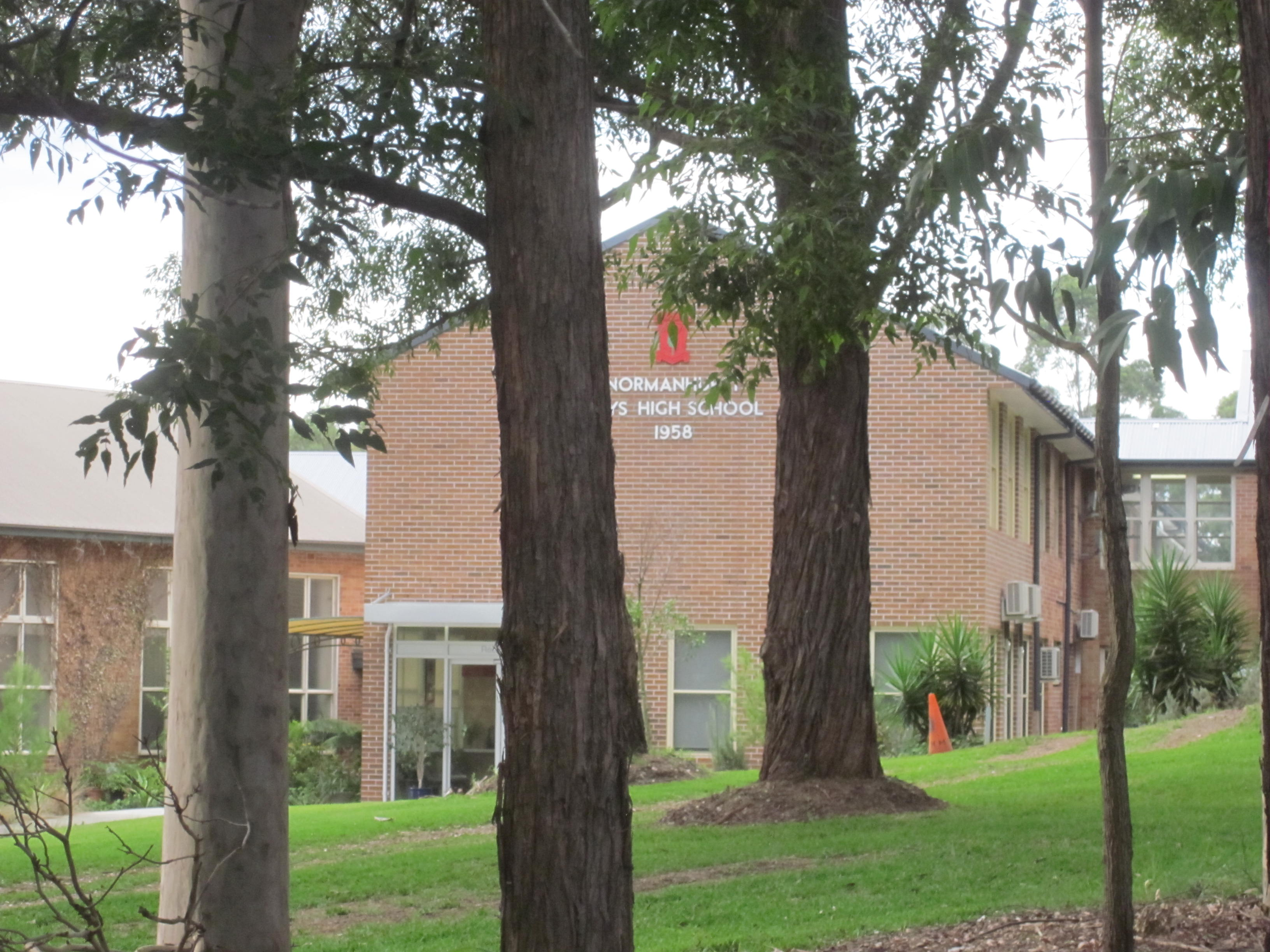
- Normanhurst Boys High School, main building

Location
- Pennant Hills Road, Normanhurst, New South Wales; Australia; 33°43′17″S 151°6′5″E

Information
- Type: Academically selective Secondary school Day school Single-sex school
- Motto: Know thyself
- Established: 1958; 68 years ago
- Educational authority: Department of Education
- Principal: Asli Harman
- Staff: c. 68
- Years: 7–12
- Gender: Boys
- Age: 12 to 18
- Enrolment: 752 (2025)
- Campus size: 6.3 hectares (16 acres)
- Campus type: Suburban parkland
- Houses: 4
- Colours: Red and black
- Nickname: Normo
- Publication: The Normanhurst News
- Yearbook: Phoenix Magazine
- Affiliations: North West Metropolitan Sports Association
- Alumni: Old Boys
- Website: normanhurb-h.schools.nsw.gov.au

Normanhurst Boys High School (commonly known as Normo Boys or simply Normo) is an academically selective secondary day school for boys, located in Normanhurst, a suburb on the Upper North Shore of Sydney, New South Wales, Australia.

Established in 1958, the school caters for approximately 730 students from Year 7 to Year 12, who are accepted on an academic basis. Based on entry standards and HSC school rankings, it is one of the top ten schools in New South Wales. The school celebrated its 60th anniversary in 2018.

== History ==
In 1957, five schools made up the Hornsby school site, located on Pennant Hills Road: a boys primary school and a boys junior technical school on the eastern side, and an infants school, a girls' primary school, and a girls domestic science school on the western side. On 30 November 1957, the three western schools were destroyed by bushfires. Over the 1957–58 Christmas holidays, the three schools were relocated into the facilities of the boys technical school, and the three year groups of boys were moved to a newly built but unopened school at Normanhurst.

From its opening in 1958 until 1993, Normanhurst Boys High School operated as a comprehensive school. In 1993, the Government of New South Wales marked Normanhurst as one of several high schools allowed to select students by academic achievement. The first intake of "selective" students was made up of those starting Year Seven in 1994, with a new intake of Year Sevens each year, until the school became fully selective in 1999. Presently, Normanhurst is one of seventeen fully selective schools in New South Wales and considers itself to be the sister school of fellow selective school Hornsby Girls High School due to their proximity and past ties with each other. Since 2020, Normanhurst also has partnered with Bonghwang High School in Naju-si, Jeollanam-do, South Korea, and officially signed a sister-school agreement in 2024, committing both schools to ongoing collaboration and future exchanges.

== Academics ==
Like other academically selective schools, Normanhurst is known for its high academic achievement in the Higher School Certificate. The following table shows the school's rankings relative to other schools in the state. The rankings are based on the percentage of exams sat that resulted in a placing on the Distinguished Achievers List (highest band result) as shown by the Board of Studies, Teaching and Educational Standards (BOSTES NSW).

| Year | Rank in state |
|---|---|
| 2009 | 21 |
| 2010 | 17 |
| 2011 | 19 |
| 2012 | 27 |
| 2013 | 19 |
| 2014 | 22 |
| 2015 | 25 |
| 2016 | 11 |
| 2017 | 13 |
| 2018 | 16 |
| 2019 | 11 |
| 2020 | 7 |
| 2021 | 10 |
| 2023 | 8 |
| 2024 | 4 |
| 2025 | 5 |

== Demographics ==
The school's students are one of the most socio-economically advantaged in NSW, in terms of the Index of Community Socio-Educational Advantage score, with its average score being 1207, in the 99th percentile of all schools, and 75% of students at the school from families in the top quarter of socio-educational advantage. As a result, the school has been mentioned as part of an ongoing debate about whether Australian selective schools accept enough students from less well-off families, and if selective schools create social inequality. 91% of students from the school come from a language background other than English.

== Structure ==
=== Entry ===
Normanhurst Boys High School is an academically selective high school and accepts a relatively small intake of 120 students in Year 7. Offers of admission and matriculation into the school in Year 7 are made on the basis of academic merit, as assessed by the Selective High School Placement Test, sat in Year 6.

A number of students may be accepted into Years 8 through to 11, through direct application to the school and a subsequent internal selection process, consisting of a consideration of character, extracurricular activities and academic ability. An interview is then required before a final offer is made.

=== Houses ===
The school has four houses, which were given the names for various Australian animals in various Aboriginal languages. Students compete under their respective house at sporting carnivals. The houses are:

| Bukkandi House | Red |
| Dinewan House | Blue |
| Warrigal House | Gold |
| Wayamba House | Green |

Bukkandi means quoll in the Kamilaroi language. Dinewan is named for a Dreamtime story about an emu in the Wiradjuri language. Warrigal means dingo and Wayamba is named for a turtle in a Dreamtime story, both of which are from the Dharug language.

=== Facilities ===
The school has an area of 6.3 hectares, and is within a five minute 750m walk of Normanhurst railway station. Facilities include a sporting field, three tennis courts and several basketball courts. There are two gates of entry, one reserved for senior boys (Years 11-12) in Denman Parade, and one for junior boys (Years 7-10) in Fraser Road.

The campus is made of five blocks, labelled A to E. A Block contains most of the mathematics classrooms on the ground floor, all HSIE classrooms on the first floor and the drama centre. It also has the canteen below it, leading to the toilets and E Block. B Block, which used to be labelled together with A Block, contains all English classrooms throughout the two floors and two mathematics classrooms. A Block and B Block are physically connected together. C Block contains the two music classrooms, the three language classrooms, two science labs, and a dark room. D Block, which opened in 2010, contains four science labs on the ground floor and the library on the first floor. E Block, which used to be called B Block before the split of A Block happened, houses all visual arts and technology rooms, including a design centre, woodwork and metalwork rooms, and a kitchen.

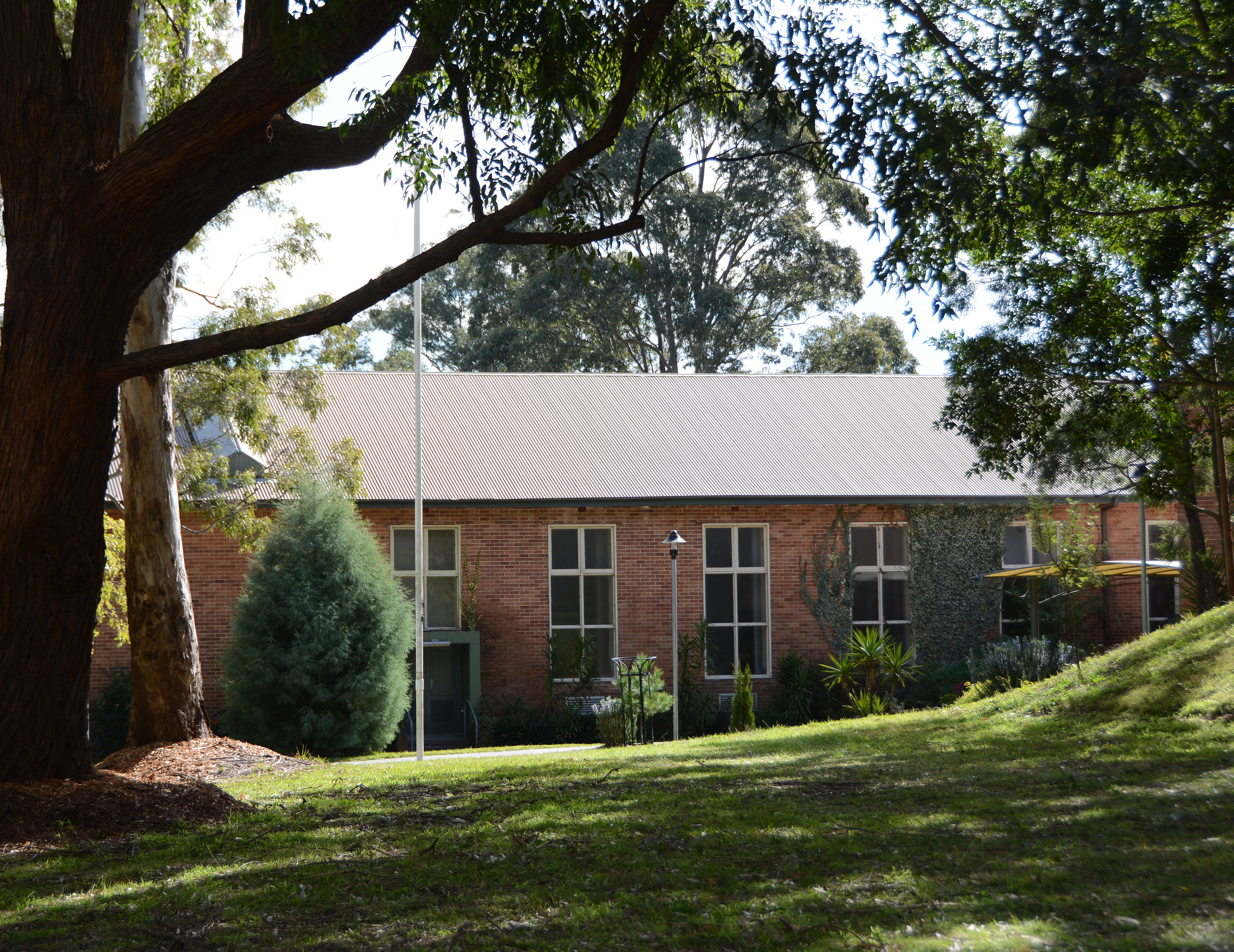
Normanhurst Boys High School

=== Sport ===
Normanhurst Boys High School is a member of the North West Metropolitan Sports Association, which includes Ashfield Boys High School, Epping Boys High School, Homebush Boys High School, Hornsby High School and North Sydney Boys High School.

The sporting year is divided into two seasons, summer and winter, and boys are able to select sports they wish to play throughout the semester. All boys must play sports until Year 11, and are encouraged to play grade sport, representing the school in inter-school competitions. Sports offered include:

Summer Sports

- Baseball
- Basketball
- Cricket
- Futsal
- League Tag
- Volleyball
- Water Polo

Winter Sports

- Badminton
- Football (Soccer)
- Lawn Bowls
- Table Tennis
- Tennis

There are also recreational sports choices, including:

- Badminton
- Golf
- Fitness and Gym
- Lawn Bowls
- Squash
- Table Tennis
- Tennis

The school also holds annual swimming and athletics carnivals, as well as an annual cross-country event.

=== Co-curricular activities ===
The school offers numerous clubs and societies to students. These include:

- Chess club
- Creator's club
- Debating and public speaking
- Legal Club
- Concert band
- Environmental society
- Jazz ensemble
- Mooting and mock trial
- Robotics and programming club
- Social justice society
- History Club
- Filmmaking Club
- Stage bands (first and second)
- String ensemble
- Choir
- Composer's Club

The school participates in the Duke of Edinburgh's Award Scheme, as well as running its own secondary school army cadet unit, 226 Army Cadet Unit. In conjunction with Hornsby Girls High School, a (supposedly annual) musical production is put on, for which boys can audition and participate in. An annual art exhibition is also run by the school.

Normanhurst runs school camps for grades 7–11, notably a camp for Year 7 students to Jenolan Caves and the Central West of New South Wales. The week-long excursion has been running in various forms since 1959. On the camp, boys are accompanied by mentors from senior years. The school also offers overseas cultural trips to London, Paris, Rome and New York.

Normanhurst is also home to a FIRST Robotics Competition team, Team 4739: Normanhurst Nitro, formerly CTRL F5, founded in 2012 with their rookie year in 2013, competing every year since and being part of the initial 5 Australian teams founded by Team 3132: Thunder Down Under, and the oldest public school team still competing. They have also entered in the FIRST Tech Challenge, placing first and have also won the Duel Down Under in 2019, run by Team 3132.

== Motto ==
The school's motto, Know Thyself, is a Delphic maxim which is attributed to Ancient Greece. The phrase has been expounded by Aeschylus, Socrates and Plato, among others. It is given as nosce te ipsum or temet nosce in Latin.

== Notable alumni ==
Alumni of Normanhurst Boys High School are commonly referred to as Old Boys. Some notable Normanhurst Old Boys include:

=== Business ===
- David Hill – Chairman and CEO of Fox Sports, creator of the Sky Sports channel, former chairman of Fox Broadcasting

=== Media, entertainment, and the arts ===
- Rowan Cahill – historian and journalist
- Vince Melouney – guitarist, vocalist and songwriter, former member of the Bee Gees.

=== Medicine and science ===
- Michael Barber AO – mathematician, physicist, academic
- Raymond Allen Hare – wheat scientist
- Jordan Nguyen – biomedical engineer and inventor
- Ian Plimer – geologist and academic
- John Shine – biochemist and molecular biologist

=== Politics, public service, and the law ===
- Peter Andren AM – former Independent Member for Calare in the Parliament of Australia (1996–2007)
- Peter Baldwin – former Labor Member for Sydney in the Parliament of Australia (1983–1998), former Minister for Employment and Education Services (1990), former Minister for Higher Education and Employment Services (1990–1993), former Minister for Social Security (1993–1996)
- Doug Jones – international arbitrator
- Peter McClellan – Chief Judge in Common Law of the Supreme Court of New South Wales (since 2005), Chief Royal Commissioner of the Royal Commission into Institutional Responses to Child Sexual Abuse

=== Sport ===
- David Brown – former Australian rules footballer
- Rodger Davis – golfer
- Neil Maxwell – former NSW and Australia A cricketer
- Richard Pybus – cricketer and former Pakistan cricket coach
- Murray Barnes – former Socceroos captain
- Robert Wheatley – former Socceroo (1981 to 1990)
- Todd Woodbridge – sports broadcaster for Nine Network and former professional tennis player
- Aleksandar Vukic – tennis player

== See also ==
- List of selective high schools in New South Wales
- List of government schools in New South Wales
