= Janet Walker =

Canadian legal scholar

Professor Janet Walker CM, CD
- Occupations: Lawyer, academic, international arbitrator
- Spouse: Doug Jones
- Website: https://janet-walker.com/

Janet Walker is a Chartered Arbitrator with offices in Toronto, Canada (Toronto Arbitration Chambers), London, England (Atkin Chambers) and Sydney, Australia (Sydney Arbitration Chambers). She is a Canadian scholar and author in the fields of Private International Law and Civil Procedure at Osgoode Hall Law School. She is also a Distinguished Research Professor at York University. Walker is married to Australian lawyer and international arbitrator, Doug Jones.

== Education and teaching ==
Walker completed her undergraduate and masters studies at York University, completing a Bachelor of Arts (Honours) in 1979 and a Master of Arts in 1982. She later obtained an LLB from Osgoode Hall Law School in 1993, which was redesignated as a JD in 2012. She then completed a DPhil at Oxford University, subsequently receiving an Oxford MA in 2010.

Walker has spent much of her academic career at Osgoode Hall Law School, York University, where she has served as Professor and Associate Dean. Her teaching has focused mainly on conflict of laws, class actions, and international arbitration. In recognition of her work in the Osgoode Professional Masters Program, she was appointed one of the 25 Distinguished Research Professors of York University in 2020, and she received a York University Research Award in 2021.

In addition to her classroom teaching, Walker has been actively involved in legal skills training and international moot court competitions. From 2001-2014, she coached Osgoode Hall Law School's team in the Willem C. Vis Moot, including when the team won the competition in 2004. Since 2001, she has also served as arbitrator for the competition.

Walker has also taught as a visiting scholar at a number of universities including:

- Monash University;
- New York University as part of the Hauser Global Law Faculty;
- University of Toronto;
- University of Haifa;
- Oxford University as the Leverhulme Visiting Professor;
- National University of Singapore at the joint program with New York University;
- Institute in International Commercial Law and Dispute Resolution in Zagreb and Zadar, Croatia; and
- Faculté des sciences juridiques, sociales et politiques de Tunis (Foreign Research Professor).

== Career ==
=== Author ===
Walker is a leading scholar in the fields of private international law and civil procedure. Her published work includes more than 60 peer-reviewed articles, as well as numerous contributions to legal textbooks, reference works, and edited collections.

She is best known as the author of Canadian Conflict of Laws (LexisNexis), the principal Canadian treatise on private international law. The work has been cited extensively by Canadian courts and has been described as "the most cited private law work in Canadian jurisprudence". Walker also authored the Conflict of Laws volume of Halsbury's Laws of Canada (LexisNexis Canada, 1st issue and subsequent issues 2006, 2011, 2016, 2020) and has held editorial roles on several editions of major Canadian legal publications, including The Civil Litigation Process (6th-9th eds, Emond Montgomery, 2005, 2010, 2015, 2020), Class Actions in Canada (1st and 2nd eds, Emond, 2013, 2018), and Private International Law in Common Law Canada (3rd-5th eds, Emond Montgomery, 2010, 2016, 2023).

In addition to her sole-authored works, Walker has collaborated on a number of books addressing civil litigation, comparative law, and legal classification, including Civil Litigation (Irwin, 2010) and Common Law, Civil Law and the Future of Categories (LexisNexis, 2010). Her scholarship has contributed to the development of Canadian jurisprudence in private international law, civil procedure, class actions, and international commercial arbitration.

Walker also serves as Executive Editor of the Canadian Journal of Commercial Arbitration.

Walker has also contributed to the legal scholarship on arbitration in Australia as co-author of Commercial Arbitration in Australia under the Model Law (Thomson Reuters, 2022) and The Laws of Australia volume on Arbitration (Thomson Reuters, 2023). She gave the 24th Annual Clayton Utz-University of Sydney Lecture on dissents in Arbitration.

=== Arbitrator ===
Walker is a Fellow and Chartered Arbitrator of the Chartered Institute of Arbitrators (CIArb) and has developed an international practice as an arbitrator in commercial and investor state disputes. She is associated with Toronto Arbitration Chambers, Atkin Chambers in London, and Sydney Arbitration Chambers. Her arbitral work spans a range of commercial and construction disputes, and she has acted as sole arbitrator, presiding arbitrator, and co-arbitrator in proceedings conducted under the rules of major arbitral institutions including the International Chamber of Commerce (ICC), Dubai International Arbitration Centre (DIAC), Singapore International Arbitration Centre (SIAC), Hong Kong International Arbitration Centre (HKIAC), London Court of International Arbitration (LCIA) and the International Centre for Dispute Resolution (ICDR), Permanent Court of Arbitration (PCA) as well as ad hoc arbitrations.

In addition to her arbitral appointments, Walker has held leadership positions in a number of international arbitration organisations. She is past Chair of ICC Canada and serves on the ICC Commission. She has also held positions with the International Association of Procedural Law, CIArb Canada, the International Construction Law Association, and the International Construction Projects Committed of the International Bar Association. She was instrumental in the development of Canada's arbitration community, serving as founding chair of both the Toronto Chapter of CIArb North America Branch and the Arbitration Roundtable of Toronto, which later became the Toronto Commercial Arbitration Society (TCAS).

Walker has been appointed to the panels of numerous arbitral institutions worldwide, reflecting her standing in the field of international commercial arbitration. These institutions include the AAA, ACICA, AIAC, BVI IAC, CIArb, CIETAC, HKIAC, JCAA, KCAB International, LCIA, SCIA, SHIAC, SIAC, Ukrainian Chamber, and VanIAC, among others. She has also participated in initiatives aimed at promoting arbitration practice and scholarship internationally, including serving on the organising committee of ICCA Sydney 2018 and as chair and founder of CanArbWeek.

Through her arbitral practice, institutional leadership, and scholarly contributions, Walker has become a prominent figure in the development of international commercial arbitration in Canada and internationally.

=== Expert/Consultant ===
For more than twenty years, Janet consulted and provided expert evidence on questions of jurisdiction, judgments and applicable law in 60+ crossborder disputes. She has also offered expert assistance to members of the profession in the public and private sectors in Canada, the United States, the United Kingdom and Australia.

=== Advisory Roles ===
Walker was the common law advisor to the Federal Courts (Canada) Rules Committee from 2006 to 2015. She is Secretary-General of the International Association of Procedural Law, and is a former president of the Canadian branch of the International Law Association. Walker was the CIArb Academic Advisor in 2014-2015, and she a member of the Scientific Advisory Board, the Max Planck Institute Luxembourg as well as the Global Advisory Board, New York International Arbitration Center.

== Honours and awards ==
In addition to her academic and professional achievements, Walker served in the Canadian Forces Primary Reserve from 1977 to 2014 and in the Supplementary Ready Reserve from 2014 to 2019. During her military service, she received the Canadian Forces' Decoration, the Land Force Central Area Commander's Award of Excellence, and the Governor General's Horse Guards Commanding Officer and Regimental Sergeant Major's Award of Excellence. She was the first female Bandmaster of the Governor General's Horse Guards and upon retirement was noted as the regiment's longest-serving and highest-ranking female non-commissioned member.

Walker has received numerous honours recognising her contributions to law, education, and public service. These include the Queen's Diamond Jubilee Medal (2012), the Queen's Golden Jubilee Medal (2002), the Viscount Bennett Fellowship (1995), and the Osgoode Hall Law School Silver Medal (1993).

In 2020, York University conferred upon Walker the title of Distinguished Research Professor in recognition of her scholarly achievements and international leadership in private international law, procedural law, comparative law, and international commercial arbitration. The following year, she was appointed a Member of the Order of Canada for her contributions to commercial arbitration, conflict of laws, and the development of legal procedural standards in Canada.

== Memberships ==
Walker is a member of the University Club of Toronto and of the Athenaeum Club, London, and a Senior Fellow of Massey College, Toronto. She is an elected member of the American Law Institute, the International Academy of Commercial and Consumer Law and The Advocate's Society. She is also a member of the Bar of Ontario, the Law Society of Upper Canada, the Canadian Bar Association, the International Bar Association and the London Court of International Arbitration. In 2021, Walker joined Atkin Chambers as a door tenant.
