= SS Dalfram =

British cargo ship

History

United Kingdom
- Name: Dalfram
- Operator: Campbell Brothers & Co, Newcastle-upon-Tyne
- Builder: Scotts Shipbuilding and Engineering Company, Greenock, Scotland
- Yard number: 546
- Launched: 2 April 1930
- Completed: April 1930
- Fate: Sunk on 4 August 1943

General characteristics
- Tonnage: 4,557 GRT; 2,821 NRT
- Length: 406.5 ft (123.9 m)
- Beam: 54.1 ft (16.5 m)
- Propulsion: 1-screw, Q4 cyl (21.5, 31, 45, 65 x 48in), 457 nhp
- Speed: 11 knots (20 km/h; 13 mph)
- Crew: 43

SS Dalfram was a British cargo steamer of 4,557 gross register tons (GRT) built in 1930 by Scotts Shipbuilding and Engineering Company, Greenock for Campbell Brothers and Co, Newcastle upon Tyne. The ship was launched on 2 April 1930.

The vessel is best known for its part in the Dalfram dispute of 1938 at Port Kembla in Australia while contracted by Japanese company Mitsui to carry a cargo of pig iron to the steel works in Kobe, Japan. The ten-week dispute earned Australian Attorney General (later Prime Minister) Robert Menzies the nickname of "Pig Iron Bob" when he attempted to force the workers to load the cargo.

On 2 May 1942 Dalfram had a narrow escape when she struck a naval mine laid by the German ship Doggerbank, a British-built ship captured by the Germans and then used as an auxiliary minelayer. Dalfram, after hitting the mine, was able to return to Cape Town, South Africa, under her own power for repairs.

Dalfram, carrying a load of coal, was sunk on 4 August 1943 with three of her 43 crew lost, when en route from Lourenco Marques and Durban for Aden and Alexandria via Mauritius. The ship was torpedoed by the German submarine U-181 and sunk east of Madagascar. The crew of Dalfram abandoned ship taking to the lifeboats which landed on the island of Île Sainte-Marie, east of Madagascar eight days later.
