= Robert Wheatley (soccer) =

Australian soccer player

Personal information
- Full name: Robert Wheatley
- Date of birth: 17 January 1962 (age 64)
- Position: Defender

Senior career*
| Years | Team | Apps | (Gls) |
| 1981–1985 | Blacktown City Demons | | |
| 1989–1990 | Marconi Stallions | 28 | (0) |
- Parramatta Eagles
| 1994 | Bonnyrigg White Eagles | 20 | (1) |

International career^{‡}
| 1981–1986 | Australia | 5 | (0) |
- * Club domestic league appearances and goals as of 21 August 2007 ‡ National team caps and goals as of 21 August 2007

Robert Wheatley (born 17 January 1962) is a former Australian football player. He went on to make 9 appearances (5 'A' matches) for the Socceroos between 1981 and 1990. He was educated at Normanhurst Boys High School in the north-western suburbs of Sydney.
