= Rupert Lockwood =

Australian journalist and communist

Rupert Ernest Lockwood (10 March 1908 – 8 March 1997) was an Australian journalist and communist activist.

Lockwood was born in Natimuk, Victoria, to newspaper proprietor Alfred Wright Lockwood and Alice Francis. He became a journalist in 1930, working for the Melbourne Herald until 1935, when he went overseas. He worked in Singapore, Japan, China and the United Kingdom before observing the rise of fascism in Germany, Italy and Spain. He returned to Australia in 1938 and joined the Communist Party of Australia (CPA member, 1939 - 1969), on the day Australia declared war.

During 1941 Lockwood spent time with Lorraine Murray, who was an informant for the Commonwealth Investigation Branch, and he would describe her as '[t]he shady lady hired by the secret police to watch me' and say that she was 'beautiful, irresponsible, vicious and slanderous'.

After finding work in the minor labour press, Lockwood became associate editor and then editor of the Waterside Workers' Federation newspaper, Maritime Worker. He played a significant part in the Royal Commission on Espionage (1954–55), in which the government alleged that he was a Russian spy. In 1969, he left the Communist Party, disillusioned after the Soviet invasion of Czechoslovakia.

He wrote several books including:

The story of Jim Healy (1951)
America invades Australia (1955)
Black Armada (1975)
Humour Is Their Weapon (1985)
Ship to Shore (1990)
War on the Waterfront (1987)

Lockwood died in 1997.

== Black Armada ==
Black Armada is an account of the Australian contribution to the creation of the Indonesian Republic. Many forces contrived to make that happen. At that time, Australia was led by a Labor government, the Australian shipping unions were largely Communist led, a substantial group of nationalist Indonesian political prisoners (the Digul|Tanah-Merah prisoners) had been interned in prison camps in Australia, and the Netherlands East Indies government-in-exile had been installed in Australia, at Wacol, Queensland.

The book details how those forces came together to facilitate mutinies of Indonesian seamen, and Australian boycotts at vital Australian ports, starting in September 1945, affecting Dutch shipping to the Dutch East Indies. Those actions helped to provide vital time for Indonesian nationalists to frustrate Dutch intentions to re-impose colonial rule after the war.

== See also ==
- Black Armada
- Tanah Merah
- Indonesian National Revolution
