= Doug Jones (international arbitrator) =

Doug Jones AO, RFD
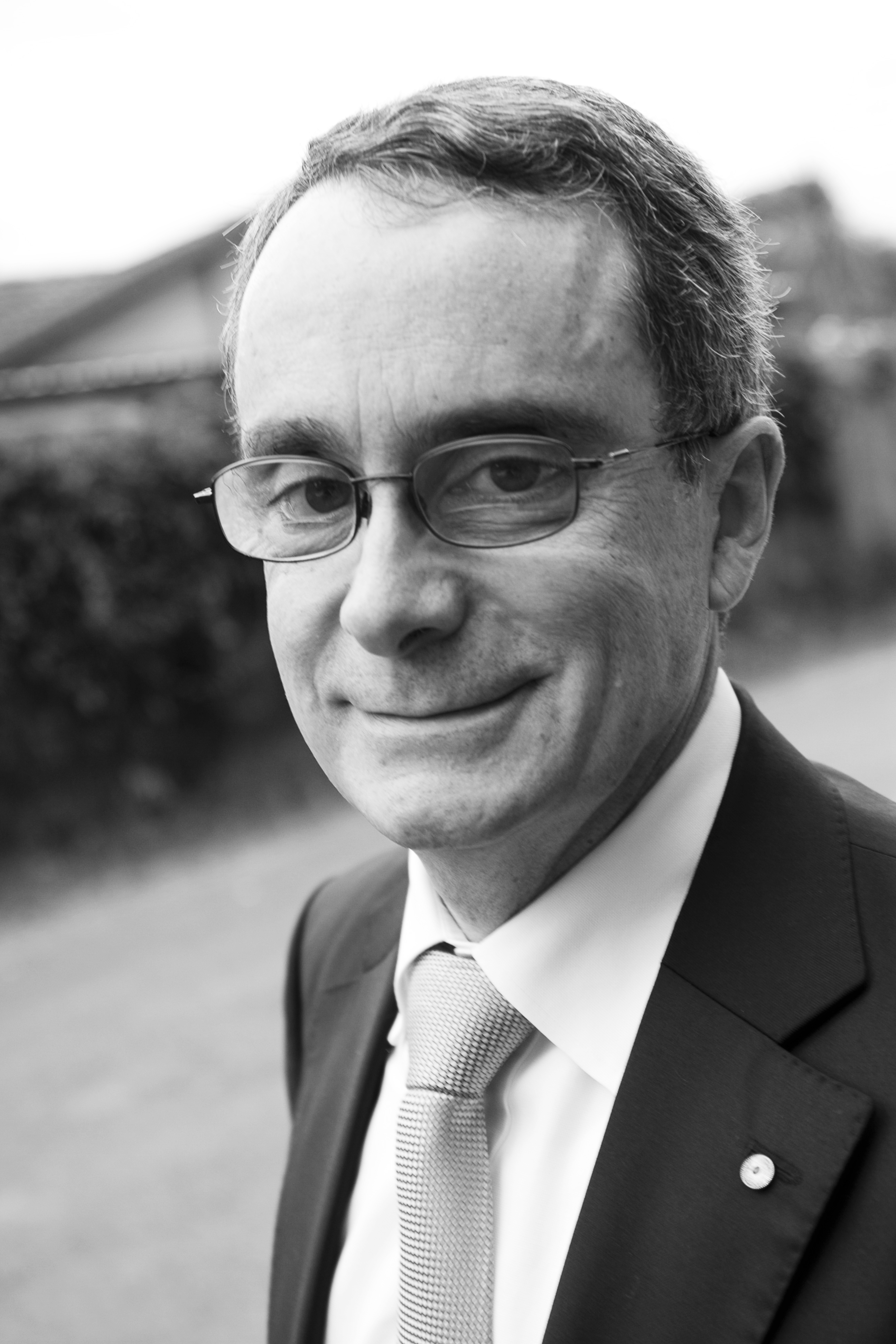

Personal details
- Born: 3 October 1949 (age 76)
- Spouse: Janet Walker
- Profession: Lawyer, international arbitrator
- Website: https://dougjones.info/static-site

Douglas Samuel Jones, AO, RFD (born 3 October 1949) is an independent international arbitrator based in London, Sydney, and Toronto. He is a door tenant at Atkin Chambers, London, a member of Sydney Arbitration Chambers, and a member of Toronto Arbitration Chambers. He has served as an International Judge of the Singapore International Commercial Court since 2019.

== Early life and education ==
Born in 1949, Jones was educated at Normanhurst Boys' High School, Southport State High School, and the University of Queensland in Australia. He graduated from the University of Queensland with a combined Bachelor of Arts and Bachelor of Laws degree in 1974, followed by a Master of Laws in 1977.

== Career ==
Jones began his legal career in 1969 in Brisbane as an articled clerk at Morris Fletcher & Cross, which later became part of MinterEllison. In 1976, he was appointed a partner of Morris Fletcher & Cross and head of its National Construction & Engineering group, a position that he continued to hold when he left Brisbane in 1989 to set up the firm's Sydney office.

In 1993, Jones joined the Sydney office of Clayton Utz as a partner and national head of the firm's Construction group. In 1995, he became head of the International Arbitration and Private International Law group, and in 2000, he became head of the firm's National Major Projects group. He was a member of the Clayton Utz Board from 2002 to 2006, and served as a partner until 2014, when he retired to become a full-time international arbitrator. He served as a part-time consultant to Clayton Utz from 2015 to 2019 until establishing independent chambers in Sydney in 2019.

Jones has held appointments to a number of professional bodies. Among others, he is: Past President of the International Academy of Construction Lawyers (2018–2020); Past President of the Australian Centre for International Commercial Arbitration (ACICA) (2008–2014); Companion, Chartered Arbitrator, and Past President of the Chartered Institute of Arbitrators (CIArb) (2011); Fellow of both the Resolution Institute (formerly The Institute of Arbitrators and Mediators Australia) and the Arbitrators and Mediators Institute of New Zealand (AMINZ); and Past President of the Dispute Resolution Board Australasia Inc (DRBA). Jones also holds professorial appointments at Queen Mary University of London and the University of Melbourne.

Jones has served as arbitrator in over 200 ad hoc and institutional commercial arbitrations under institutional rules of the American Arbitration Association (AAA), International Centre for Dispute Resolution (ICDR), Resolution Institute (formerly The Institute of Arbitrators and Mediators Australia), Australian Centre for International Commercial Arbitration (ACICA), Dubai International Arbitration Centre (DIAC), Hong Kong International Arbitration Centre (HKIAC), International Chamber of Commerce (ICC), Asian International Arbitration Centre (AIAC), London Court of International Arbitration (LCIA), Singapore International Arbitration Centre (SIAC), Korean Commercial Arbitration Board (KCAB), Cairo Regional Centre for International Commercial Arbitration (CRCICA), Vietnam International Arbitration Center (VIAC), Arbitration Institute of the Stockholm Chamber of Commerce (SCC), and European Development Fund Arbitration and Conciliation Rules as well as UNCITRAL Rules, in disputes of values exceeding some billions $US. In 2010, Jones was appointed as an Australian Government nominee on the International Centre for Settlement of Investment Disputes (ICSID) Panel of Arbitrators. He was re-appointed to this role in 2017.

Jones is acknowledged as a leading arbitrator, having been ranked in a number of leading directories. Chambers Asia-Pacific has recognised Doug as "without question the leading Asia-Pacific-based arbitrator for construction disputes" and testified that "[h]e is regarded by many as 'the leading construction arbitrator in the world'". Lexology described him as "one of the world's leading practitioners," notable for his "robust knowledge of domestic and international infrastructure and construction disputes."

== Publications ==
Jones is the author of Building and Construction Claims and Disputes (Construction Publications, 1996), Commercial Arbitration in Australia (2nd ed, Thomson Reuters, 2013), and Commercial Arbitration in Australia under the Model Law (Thomson Reuters, 2022). He is the co-editor-in-chief of the International Construction Law Review, and has also published numerous articles and book chapters on construction law and dispute resolution. He regularly contributes to a range of industry journals and publications.

For a list of publications, see: https://dougjones.info/publications/.

== Honours ==
In January 1999, Jones was appointed a Member of the Order of Australia for "service to the law, particularly in the field of construction law, and to the development of arbitration and alternative dispute resolution methods".

In June 2012 he was appointed an Officer of the Order of Australia for "distinguished service to the law as a leader in the areas of arbitration and alternative dispute resolution, to policy reform, and to national and international professional organisations".

In August 2014, he was awarded the Michael Kirby Lifetime Achievement Award at the 2014 Lawyers Weekly Law Awards. In presenting the award, the editor of Lawyers Weekly said:

"Doug has left a lasting legacy not just on the Australian legal profession, but the international legal community. No one in the Australian legal sector has done more to promote Australia as a viable destination to hear international commercial arbitration matters than Doug. His tireless energy and devotion in promoting Alternative Dispute Resolution here and abroad has ensured Australia has a credible international voice in major discussions and developments on the global commercial dispute resolution scene."

In June 2016, he was appointed Companion of the Chartered Institute of Arbitrators in recognition of his achievements in private dispute resolution and his substantial contributions to the Chartered Institute by promoting its objectives worldwide. He is one of only five people bestowed with this honour.

In May 2018, Jones was awarded the John Shaw Medal by Roads Australia for his contribution to the Australian roads industry. He is the only lawyer to receive this accolade. That year, he also chaired the International Council of Commercial Arbitration (ICCA) Congress in Sydney.

In July 2020, Jones received the Global Arbitration Review (GAR) award for Best Prepared and Most Responsive Arbitrator. That October, he was also elected as an Honorary Bencher of the Honourable Society of Gray's Inn.

In 2022, Jones was awarded the title of 'Construction Lawyer of the Year' by Who's Who Legal. In 2025, Jones was awarded the Society of Construction Law International Medal for his contributions to construction law internationally, and was recognised with the GAR award for Best Innovation by an Individual or Organisation. In 2026, Jones maintained his Band One ranking in the Chambers Asia-Pacific international arbitration category for a sixteenth consecutive year.

== Personal life ==
He is married to Canadian scholar, author, and international arbitrator, Janet Walker.
