= Marine Cooks, Bakers and Butchers' Association of Australasia =

Former maritime trade union in Australia

Marine Cooks, Bakers, and Butchers' Association
- Marine Cooks, Bakers and Butchers' Association of Australasia
- Merged into: Seamen's Union of Australia
- Founded: 1908
- Dissolved: 1983
- Headquarters: 52 Day Street, Sydney, NSW
- Location: Australia
- Members: 500 (in 1973)

Marine Cooks, Bakers and Butchers' Association of Australasia was an Australian trade union. It was formed in Melbourne in August 1907 as a breakaway group from the Federated Stewards and Cooks' Union of Australia and was registered under the Commonwealth Conciliation and Arbitration Act 1904 in January 1908 and affiliated with the Trades and Labour Council in April 1908. The Association represented workers employed as cooks, bakers, butchers and other food preparation roles aboard ships in Australia and New Zealand. In November 1908 Mr Justice Higgins issued a judgement on rates of pay and hours for marine cooks in a case involving the Association and the Commonwealth Steamship Owners' Association. The Association moved its Head Office moved from Melbourne to Sydney in January 1915.

In 1983, the Association completed amalgamation with the Seamen's Union of Australia (SUA).

== Amalgamation ==
Following a history of co-operation on industrial issues, and the problem of reduced membership due to changes in the industry such as automation, the Marine Cooks, Bakers and Butchers' Association decided on 8 August 1979 to amalgamate with the Seamen's Union of Australia (SUA). The final vote on amalgamation was passed with a 71% majority of the association's membership in favour of the change.

The process of amalgamation, including dealing with objections raised by the Miscellaneous Workers' Union, meant that the association continued to exist, gradually merging with the SUA, a process which was completed in 1984. The amalgamation had a number of advantages, including eliminating demarcation disputes with the SUA, reducing operating costs for the small union, and providing resources to improve training and qualifications.
