= Tom Walsh (trade unionist) =

Australian trade unionist (1871–1943)

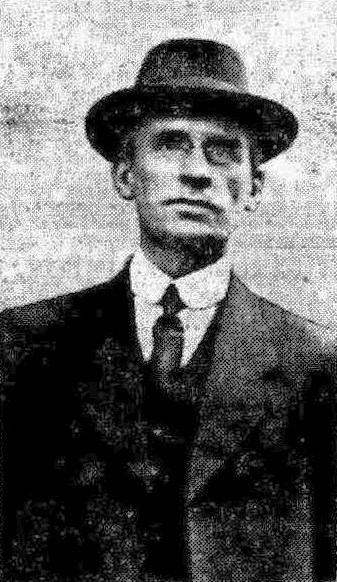
- Born: Thomas Walsh; 15 January 1871; Youghal, County Cork, United Kingdom
- Died: 5 April 1943 (aged 72); North Sydney, New South Wales, Australia
- Occupation: Trade unionist
- Known for: Federal President of the Seamen's Union of Australia
- Spouses: Margaret O'Heir (m. 1899; died 1914) Adela Pankhurst (m. 1917)
- Children: 8

Thomas Walsh (15 January 1871 – 5 April 1943) was an Irish-born Australian trade unionist.

== Early life ==
He was born at Youghal in County Cork to cobbler Patrick Walsh and Mary Walsh (née Murphy). He was raised by his aunts following his mother's early death, and had little formal education.

== Career ==
In 1893, he arrived in Brisbane with the intention of joining the planned socialist utopia New Australia, but lacked the necessary funds. He instead worked as a seaman and joined the Social Democratic Vanguard. He then moved to New South Wales, where he worked as a Newcastle agent for the Federated Seamen's Union of Australasia.

A supporter of Peter Bowling in the 1909 coal strike, he rose to state branch secretary for the union in 1912. Walsh, as general secretary of the union, organised the 1919 strike and served three months in gaol. Both Walshes were foundation members of the Communist Party, but soon fell out with the organisation.

In 1922, Tom Walsh became federal president of the Seamen's Union, extracting improved working conditions on Australian vessels through a tactic of delaying ship's sailings until the union's demands were met.

In 1925, the Bruce government deregistered the union and charged Walsh with incitement, with the ultimate goal of Walsh's deportation. After the Australian union's support for a British strike in 1925, the Deportation Board found against Walsh and fellow unionist Jacob Johnson and they were held at Garden Island until a successful appeal.

In 1928, Walsh lost control of the union to Johnson after advocating decreased militancy in order to consolidate its achievements. He attempted to form a new union founded on industrial peace but was unsuccessful, remaining exiled from the Seamen's Union until 1936.

== Personal life ==
Tom Walsh married Margaret O'Heir in Cairns on 18 November 1899. They had three daughters: Hannah (born in 1903), Elizabeth "Bessie" (born in 1905) and Sarah "Sallie" (born in 1906).

His wife Margaret died of tuberculosis on 6 April 1914 and their three daughters were sent to live with the socialist journalist Robert Ross.

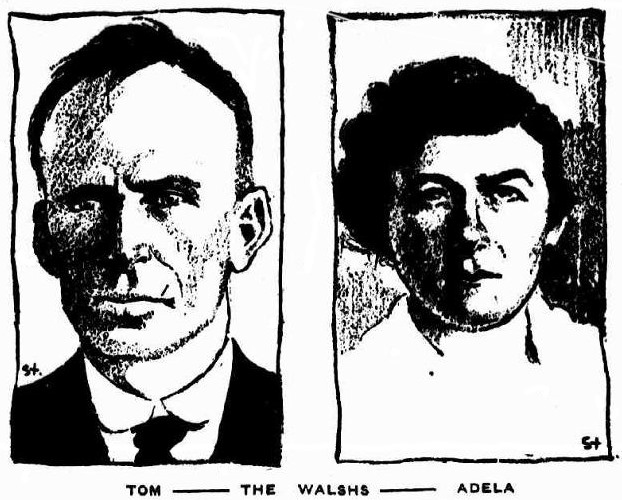
Tom and Adela (Smith's Weekly, 1922)

Also living with the Rosses was Adela Pankhurst, the daughter of famed British suffragette Emmeline Pankhurst and her husband Richard Pankhurst. They married on 30 September 1917 in Melbourne.They had one son, Richard (born in 1918) and four daughters, Sylvia (born in 1920), Christian (born in 1921), Ursula (born in 1923) and Faith (born and died in 1926). They returned to Sydney after the war.

Walsh worked as a journalist during the Great Depression, the family surviving on his journalist's wages and Adela's income as a public speaker.

The Walshes, increasingly anti-communist, advocated trade with Japan and in 1939–1940 visited the country as guests of the Japanese government, returning convinced of Japan's benevolent intentions towards Australia.

Following the attack on Pearl Harbor, Adela was interned but appealed to be allowed to return to her dying husband's side. Although the appeal was unsuccessful she was released anyway in October 1942, two days after beginning a hunger strike. Tom Walsh died at North Sydney on 5 April 1943.
