= Raymond Allen Hare =

Australian scientist

Raymond Allen Hare PSM (born 6 October 1946) is an Australian wheat scientist mainly working to develop Durum (pasta) wheat varieties.

== Early life and education ==
Hare was born in Sydney, New South Wales, Australia, on 6 October 1946. He attended Normanhurst Public School and Normanhurst Boys' High School and subsequently joined CSR as a trainee chemist at Pyrmont. After completing a chemistry certificate course at the Sydney Technical College (now known as TAFE New South Wales Sydney Institute) and a Bachelor of Agricultural Science from University of Sydney, he began his PhD, "Genetic Analysis of Persistent Adult-Plant Resistences to Wheat Rust", with support from the Farrer Memorial Research Scholarship.

== Career ==
In 1976 he began as a wheat breeder with the New South Wales Department of Agriculture (now NSW Department of Primary Industries), helping grow durum wheat exports from around 8000 tonnes in the mid-1970s to more than 800,000 tonnes, approximately aud$100 million. In addition to developing Australia's durum industry, Hare made significant contributes to durum wheat research, including developing Kamilaroi, Yallaroi, Wollaroi and EGA Bellaroi varieties.

Hare was recognised in the 2000 Birthday Honours list, receiving the Public Service Medal "[f]or outstanding public service in the Department of Agriculture, particularly to the Durum (Pasta) wheat programme". A year later, Hare was awarded the Farrer Memorial Medal, delivering his Farrer Oration, entitled "Durum Wheat in Australia – Past, Present and Future".

In 2003, Hare's hearing was found to have deteriorated to the profound range in both ears. Over a period of nine months, he received bilateral cochlear implants and his hearing stabilised. He retired in 2008, after 32 years of services as the Australian National Durum Wheat Improvement principle research scientist.

A 2018 media profile of Hare suggests he has contributed to an estimated 70 billion meals around the world. He is currently a plant breeding consultant and an advisory board member at University of Sydney Plant Breeding Institute.

== Honours ==
- Public Service Medal
- Rotary International Achievement Award
- Farrer Memorial Trust Medal, 2001 Farrer Memorial Trust
- SHHH 2007 Libby Harrick's Award
- Honorary Professor – University of Southern Queensland
- Triticum Award for Excellence in Wheat Improvement – Wheat Breeding Society of Australia Awards
- Champion of the Royal Agricultural Society, 2018.
