= Eliot V. Elliott =

- Born: 12 September 1902; Huntly, New Zealand
- Died: 26 October 1984 (aged 82)
- Occupation: Merchant Seaman
- Organization: Seamen's Union of Australia
- Title: Federal Secretary
- Term: 1941-1978
- Predecessor: W. J. Daley
- Successor: Pat Geraghty
- Political party: Communist Party of Australia (1930), Socialist Party of Australia (1971)

Eliot Valens Elliott, also known as Vic Elliott, (12 September 1902 – 26 November 1984) was a trade union leader of the Seamen's Union of Australia (SUA) from 1941 to 1978.

== Biography ==
Born in Huntly, New Zealand, Elliott left school at the age of 15, briefly worked on the New Zealand railways, before becoming a merchant seaman and travelling the world.

During the 1920s, Elliott moved to Australia to live and work as a seafarer. He was a shipboard delegate during the Seamen's Strike of 1925, which severely disrupted trade between Britain, South Africa and Australasia. By 1935 Elliott had become recognised as a leader of Australian seamen and was prominent in a bitter strike against an unsatisfactory Award and poor working conditions that lasted from December 1935 to February 1936. The strike failed with the union left divided and crippled. Recognised by his peers as a skilled and militant trade unionist, he was elected leader of the Queensland Branch of the Seamen's Union of Australia (SUA) in 1936 and also joined the Communist Party of Australia that year. In 1941, he was elected Federal Secretary of the union, a position he was to hold continually until his retirement in 1978.

Under Elliot's leadership, the SUA contributed significantly to the war effort during World War II, and over the years, the harsh and dangerous working conditions of rank and file Australian seamen greatly improved. Elliott adopted a policy of as much face-to-face contact with the rank and file as possible and established a journal, The Seamen's Voice, which allowed for significant debate and contributions from members and emphasised the importance of unity, solidarity and internationalism among seamen and maritime workers.

=== Postwar ===
In recognition of his organisational capabilities, in 1949, he was elected vice president of the Seamen's and Dockers Trade Department of the World Federation of Trade Unions, with Australian-born American longshoreman Harry Bridges elected president.

Elliott supported the Soviet invasion of Czechoslovakia in 1968 and he was a founding member of the Socialist Party of Australia in 1971. While many labelled him a Stalinist, he was a dynamic leader of the Seamen's Union, who used every opportunity to advance the interests of his members including strong advocacy for the Australian merchant fleet.

With the advancement of shipbuilding in the 1960s and containerisation, Elliott and the union's policy making body, the National Committee of Management (COM), met over four days in June 1968 and hammered out a historic document formulating the union's attitude to technological change on the basis of social progress that was subsequently unanimously adopted at meetings of seamen around Australia. Over the next 20 years, a substantial amount of this policy of fundamental improvement of working conditions was achieved. Elliott said in 1968 that seamen had "to take advantage of technological developments" and that "the future belongs to us if we learn how to grasp and hold it". He explained, "We believe men are more important than machines and new ships."

The Seamens' Union of Australia, which amalgamated with the Waterside Workers Federation in 1993 to form the Maritime Union of Australia, was also renowned in the Australian labour movement for its involvement nationally and internationally in political issues like the anti-apartheid struggle in South Africa and in protests against the Vietnam War, motivated by the necessity of social progress in work and society on a national and international scale.

Some of the ashes of Elliott were scattered on the sea south east of Sydney Heads at a mariner's funeral service held on the morning of 12 April 1985.
