= South Pacific Film Corporation =

Dutch film producer

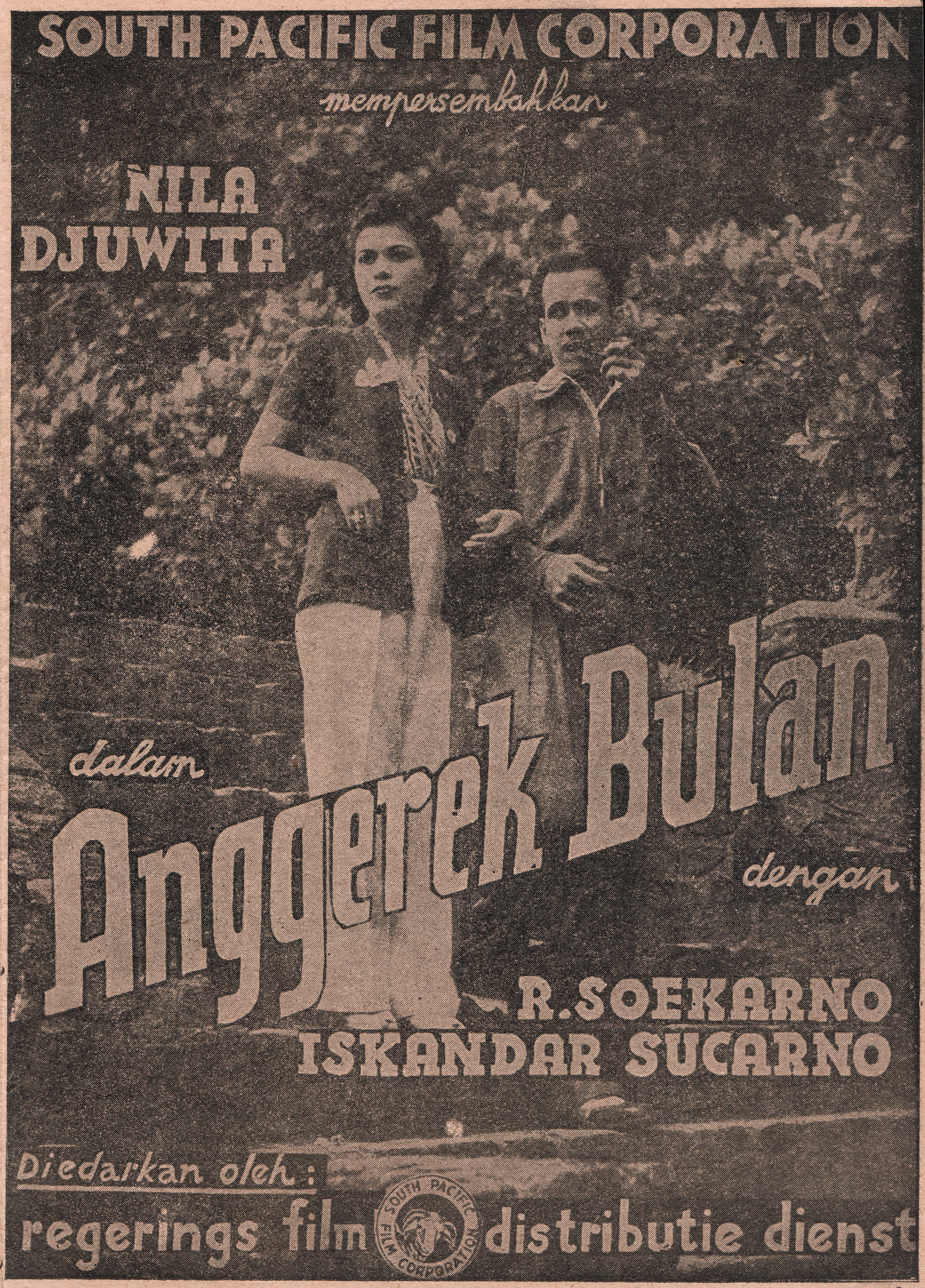

The South Pacific Film Corporation (SPFC) was a Dutch government sponsored feature film producer in the Dutch West Indies. A separate unit produced newsreels in Indonesia. The production company was sponsored under the Netherlands Indies Civil Administration. It was preceded by the Netherlands Indies Government Information Service.

Andjar Asmara worked for SPFC beginning in 1948. He brought Usmar Ismail, a young journalist with whom he had previously discussed filmmaking, to work as an assistant director. The two Native Indonesians had limited creative input, serving more as acting and dialogue coaches, while Dutch cameraman, A. A. Denninghoff-Stelling, had control of the final product.

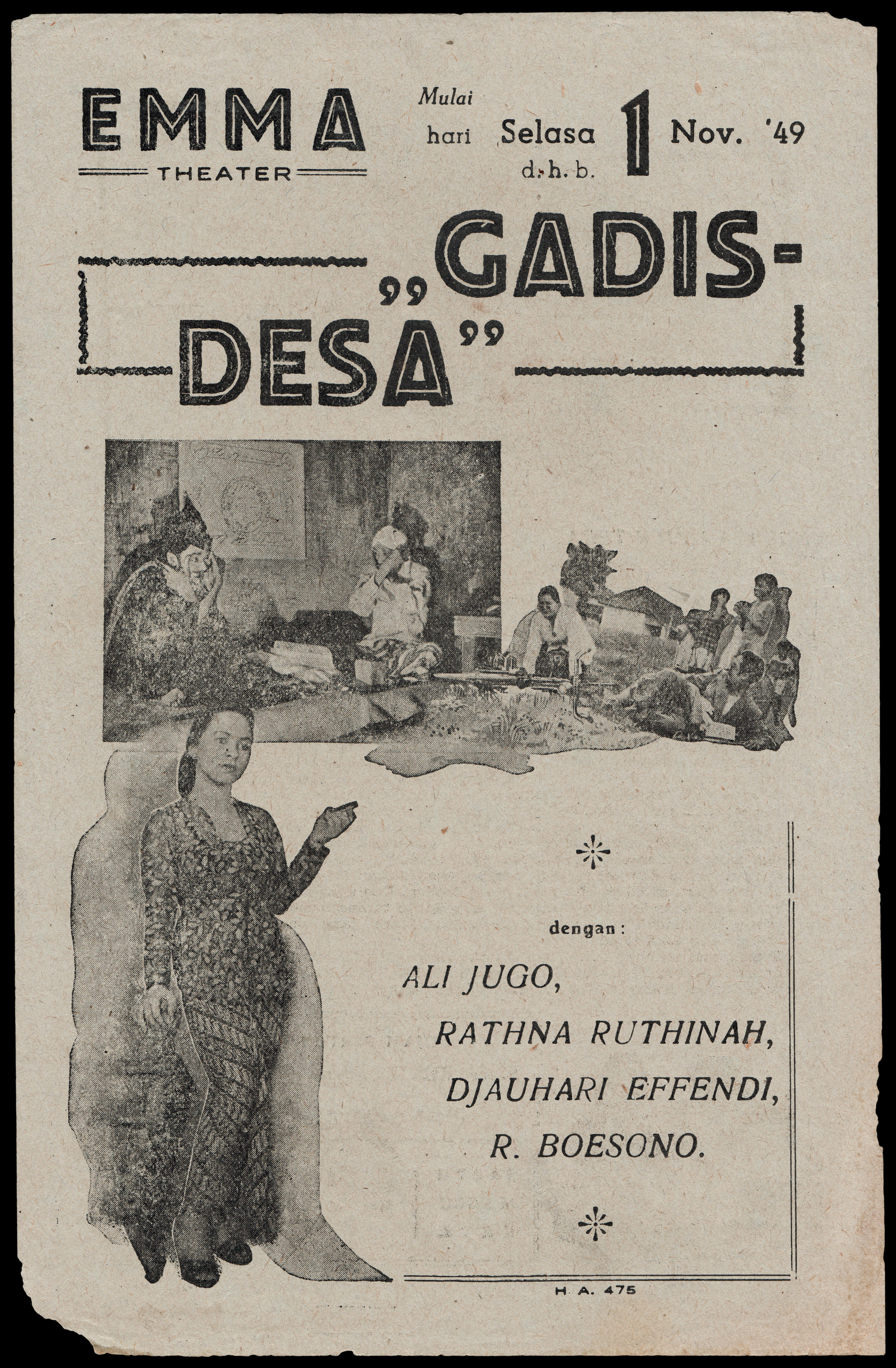

SPFC produced six films in 1949.

Max Tera worked for South Pacific Film Corporation and learned cinematography from Dutch cameraman Denninghoff-Stelling.

Rendra Karno (Soekarno) had a role in the company's production Anggrek Bulan. A. Hamid Arief acted in films for the South Pacific Film Corporation, including Usmar Ismail's debut film Tjitra.

== Films ==
- Djaoeh Dimata (Out of Sight) 1948
- Anggrek Bulan (Moon Orchid) 1948
- Gadis Desa (Maiden from the Village) 1949
- Tjitra (Image) 1949
- Harta Karun (Treasure) 1949

== See also ==
- Cinema of Indonesia
- Air Mata Mengalir di Tjitarum

== Sources ==
- "Abisin Abbas". Filmindonesia.or.id (in Indonesian). Jakarta: Konfidan Foundation. Archived from the original on 19 February 2014.
- Biran, Misbach Yusa (2009). Sejarah Film 1900–1950: Bikin Film di Jawa [History of Film 1900–1950: Making Films in Java] (in Indonesian). Jakarta: Komunitas Bamboo working with the Jakarta Art Council. ISBN 978-979-3731-58-2.
- "Gadis Desa | Kredit" [Gadis Desa | Credits]. filmindonesia.or.id (in Indonesian). Jakarta: Konfidan Foundation. Archived from the original on 20 October 2016.
- Said, Salim (1982). Profil Dunia Film Indonesia [Profile of Indonesian Cinema] (in Indonesian). Jakarta: Grafiti Pers. OCLC 9507803.
