= Jim Healy (trade unionist) =

Australian trade unionist

James 'Big Jim' Healy
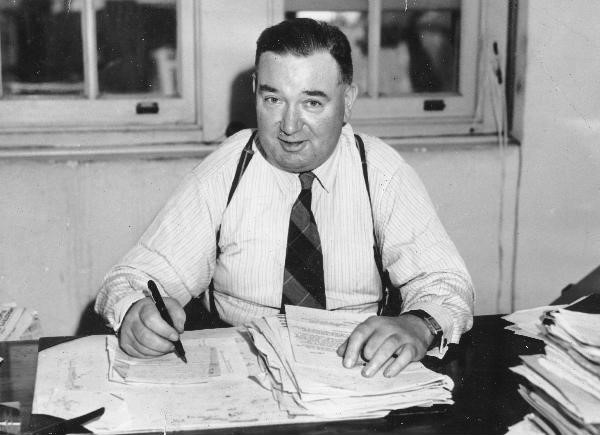

General Secretary of the Waterside Workers' Federation
- In office 1937–1961

Personal details
- Born: 22 March 1898 West Gorton, Manchester
- Died: 12 June 1961 (aged 63) Darlinghurst, New South Wales
- Occupation: Waterside worker

James "Big Jim" Healy (22 March 1898 – 13 July 1961) was an Australian trade unionist and communist activist. Healy served as General Secretary of the Waterside Workers' Federation of Australia from 1937 to his death in 1961, a period when the union recovered from its defeat in the 1928 waterfront strike to become one of the most powerful trade unions in Australia. Healy was one of the most prominent public representatives of the communist movement in Australia during the Cold War.

== Biography ==
Healy was born at West Gorton in Manchester, the son of corporation labourer Dominic Healy and cotton-worker Mary Ellen, née Schaill. He attended St Francis of Assisi parish school and began assisting Labour Party canvassers at the age of 8. He enlisted in the 8th Battalion of the Argyll and Sutherland Highlanders in 1915 and served until he was wounded in action on the Western Front in 1918 and discharged. On his return he moved to Scotland to work as a plate-layer in the tramways.

On 19 July 1919 Healy married woollen weaver Elizabeth McGowan at St Cuthbert's Catholic Church in Edinburgh. They and their three sons emigrated to Queensland in 1925, where Healy began work as a fireman and boiler attendant at Mackay. He became a wharf labourer in 1927 and the following year was elected to the management committee of the Waterside Workers' Federation (WWF) becoming branch president in 1929. Disappointed with the underperformance of various Labor governments in response to the Great Depression, Healy joined the Communist Party of Australia in 1934 after a tour of the Soviet Union.

Healy moved to Sydney in 1936 and in 1937 was elected general secretary of the WWF, a position he held until his death in 1961. He transferred the union head office from Melbourne in 1939, and is given credit for modernising the union and he was the founder and first editor of the WWF's national journal, the Maritime Worker. In 1937 and 1938 he campaigned in support of waterside workers' boycotts of Japan, and he continued to strengthen the WWF during World War II due to the industry's contribution to the war effort. From 1945 to 1949 he led a boycott on the Black Armada of Dutch ships, in order to support the Indonesian independence movement.

Healy oversaw the amalgamation of the WWF with the Permanent & Casual Wharf Labourers' Union (PCWLU), but the antagonism of many in the WWF towards the PCWLU weakened his position. In the 1949 Australian coal strike he was gaoled for contempt of court, having refused to disclose the whereabouts of money used to assist the strikers. Sentenced to a year, he was released after apologising five weeks into his sentence. He was active in the campaign against the Menzies government's attempt to ban the Communist Party.

A committee of inquiry into the waterside industry was established by the Stevedoring Industry Act of 1954, in an attempt by the government to end the WWF's monopoly on wharf labour supply. The federation went on strike with the support of the Australian Council of Trade Unions (ACTU). The government went ahead with further reforms, but Healy was appointed to the ACTU executive in 1957.

Healy died of a cerebrovascular accident in 1961 at Darlinghurst and was cremated; he was farewelled in Sussex Street with a "comrade's farewell" (Healy was an atheist), attended by hundreds of mourners. The Internationale was played and the cortège stretched for almost a mile, blocking traffic for over an hour.
