= Transport Workers Act 1928 =

Former Australian legislation

Parliament of Australia
- Long title: An Act relating to Employment to Trade and Commerce with other Countries and among the States.
- Citation: Act No. 37 of 1928
- Territorial extent: States and territories of Australia
- Royal assent: 24 September 1928
- Status: Repealed

The Transport Workers Act 1928 (Cth), more widely known as the Dog Collar Act, was a law passed by the Australian Parliament. It achieved royal assent on 24 September 1928, after being instigated and introduced to Parliament by the Bruce government (Nationalist Government of Stanley Bruce). It was ostensibly "relating to employment in relation to trade and commerce with other countries and among the states", which mirrors the wording of Section 51(i) of the Constitution of Australia.

== Background ==
Following a review of the establishing act of the Commonwealth Court of Conciliation and Arbitration (the Commonwealth Conciliation and Arbitration Act 1904), the government required that the court consider the economic effect of its industrial awards and that mandatory court-supervised ballots.

== Act ==
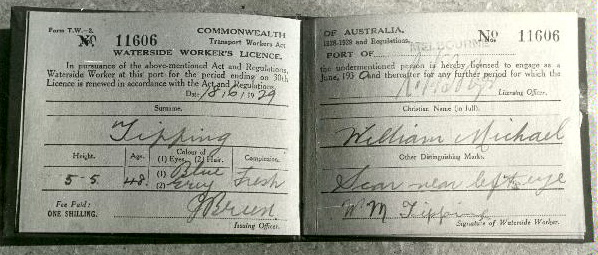
A license or "dog collar" issued to a waterfront worker under the Transport Workers Act in 1929

The Act required all waterfront workers to hold federal licences, or "dog collars" as they were derisively known, to work. The Act allowed the Commonwealth government, by regulation, to effectively control who worked on the docks and nearly destroyed the Waterside Workers Federation. The government favoured employment of non-union labour and members of the Permanent & Casual Wharf Labourers Union of Australia.

== Amendments ==
The Act was amended in 1929 and 1937, by the Transport Workers Act 1929 (Cth) and the Transport Workers Act 1939 (Cth).

== Legacy ==
The Chifley Labor government replaced the Act on 22 December 1947 with the Stevedoring Industry Act 1947, which was itself amended in 1948 and replaced with the Stevedoring Industry Act 1949, which was in turn amended in 1954 and replaced by the Stevedoring Industry Act 1956. All Acts in this series were repealed in 1977.
