= Huibert Quispel =

Dutch naval officer

- Born: Huibert Victor Quispel; 3 June 1906; Amsterdam, Netherlands
- Died: 2 May 1995 (aged 88); Voorburg, Netherlands
- Military career
- Allegiance: Netherlands
- Branch: Royal Netherlands Navy
- Rank: Lieutenant commander
- Unit: NIGIS
- Writing career
- Notable work: The Job and the Tools

Huibert Victor Quispel (3 June 1906 – 2 May 1995) was a Dutch naval officer. During World War II, he was the director of the Netherlands Indies Government Information Service based in Australia – the service was established as an intelligence-gathering and propaganda organisation during the Japanese occupation of the Dutch East Indies, and after the war, the Indonesian National Revolution.

In 1960, Quispel wrote The Job and the Tools, one of only two English language histories of the Royal Netherlands Navy.

== Bibliography ==
- Quispel, H. V. (1960). The Job and the Tools. Rotterdam: Wyt & Sons. OCLC 924417734.
