= Seamen's Union of Australia =

Former maritime trade union in Australia

SUA
- Seamen's Union of Australia
- Merged into: Maritime Union of Australia
- Founded: 1890
- Dissolved: 1993
- Headquarters: 289A Sussex St, Sydney
- Location: Australia
- Members: 4,625 (1979)
- Key people: E. V. Elliott, Tom Walsh
- Publication: The Seamen's Journal
- Affiliations: ACTU, ALP, Australian Council for Civil Liberties

The Seamen's Union of Australia (SUA) was the principal trade union for merchant seamen in Australia from 1876 to 1991. The SUA developed a reputation as one of the most militant trade unions in Australia and was closely associated with the communist movement in Australia. The SUA merged in 1993 with the Waterside Workers' Federation to become the Maritime Union of Australia (MUA).

== History ==
=== Background ===
Australian seamen were forerunners of maritime trade unionism. Efforts to form trade unions amongst merchant seamen trading out of Australian ports can be traced back to 1874, with the formation of the Sydney Seamen's Union and Melbourne Seamen's Union. The trade unions of this period inspired, among others, J. Havelock Wilson of the British National Union of Seamen, who served on Australian coasting vessels for a period in the late 1870s.

By 1890, a number of these unions had come together to form a loose federation called the Federated Seamen's Union of Australasia, which included New Zealand until the Federation of Australia in 1901 which did include New Zealand, and adopted the name Seamen's Union of Australia (SUA) in 1906. For nearly eighty years the SUA successfully improved the wages and conditions of its members by negotiations with employers and governments or by taking militant industrial action.

=== Campaigning ===
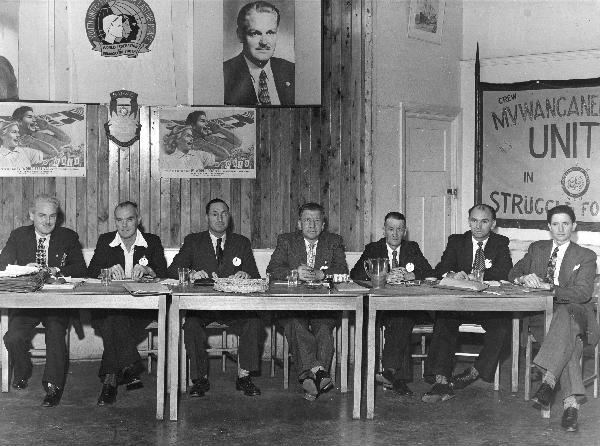
The Committee of Management of the SUA, 1952

Following World War I the SUA gained a reputation as a militant union, under the leadership of socialist-inclined Tom Walsh. During the Second World War, it was instrumental in ensuring the supply of civilian seafarers for the war effort.

The SUA also took part in a wide range of social and political issues over the years, for example campaigning for Aboriginal rights, opposing apartheid in South Africa, opposing the Vietnam War, and participating in the nuclear disarmament movement. The SUA also took part in the black bans and boycotts of Dutch shipping, where the union movement of Australia worked to aid the nascent Indonesian Republic, in particular, ensuring that no tugs towed Dutch ships. These bans commenced in September 1945, and continued through to 1949. The union's longest serving leader was Eliot V. Elliott who led the SUA from 1941–1978.

During the 1970s and 80s the union was strongly active in campaigns to address the decline of the Australian shipping industry, as alternative transport modes became more prevalent, and shipowners used flag of convenience ships to reduce costs. Reduced manning levels aboard ships also negatively impacted union members, and the union negotiated with companies to maintain the job security of Australian maritime workers.

=== Amalgamation ===
During its long history the SUA underwent several amalgamations to increase its coverage of maritime workers, particularly as the size of the workforce decreased due to automation and the use of flag of convenience vessels. The Marine Cooks Bakers and Butchers Association (formed in 1908) amalgamated with the Seamen's Union of Australia in 1983, and the Federated Marine Stewards and Pantrymen's Association merged in 1988. In 1991 the Professional Divers' Association also amalgamated with the SUA, before it joined with the Waterside Workers' Federation to become the Maritime Union of Australia (MUA) in 1993.

== Federal Secretaries ==
- Arthur Cooper 1906–1918
- Tom Walsh 1918–1922
- William Raeburn 1922–1926
- Jacob Johnson 1926–1937 (imprisoned for 4 months for inciting a 1922 strike)
- W. J. Daley 1937–1941
- Eliot V. Elliott 1941–1978
- Patrick Geraghty 1978–1991
- Anthony Papaconstuntionos 1991-1993 https://catalogue.nla.gov.au/catalog/4387403
