= Permanent & Casual Wharf Labourers Union of Australia =

Former maritime union in Australia

P.C.W.L.U.
- Permanent and Casual Wharf Labourers' Union of Australia
- Merged into: Waterside Workers' Federation
- Founded: 1917
- Dissolved: 1950
- Location: Australia

The Permanent & Casual Wharf Labourers Union of Australia (PCWLU) was an Australian union for maritime labourers.

The Union was established in opposition to the Waterside Workers' Federation of Australia. Branches were founded by "loyalists" in Sydney in response to the General Strike of 1917 and amalgamated in 1919. The union was not affiliated with Trades Hall, and was subsequently registered in 1926 under the Australian Conciliation and Arbitration Act (1904), and reregistered in the following year. Conflict between the two unions erupted into physical violence in 1931 on the steamer Kowarra moored at Lee Wharf in Newcastle. In 1946 the union applied for affiliation with its rival but was rebuffed on the charge that they were communist-controlled, and was eventually deregistered in 1950 after merging as a distinct branch of the Waterside Workers' Federation of Australia.

Officials included:

- Melbourne Branch
  - Charles Burchell (Ted Burchall his father) - Branch secretary 1928/9
  - Lionel Lewis - Legal advisor 1928/9
  - John Daniel - Branch president 1928/9
- Sydney Branch
  - David Shields - Union secretary 1929
  - F. Werry - Secretary 1924-7
  - James M'Intosh - Secretary 1919
- Newcastle Branch
  - A. Forbes - Branch secretary 1936
- Brisbane Branch
  - John Broadbent - Secretary 1933
- Adelaide Branch
- Hobart Branch

== See also ==
- List of trade unions
