= Netherlands Indies Government Information Service =

Coordinates: 37°49′1.9″S 144°57′36.5″E

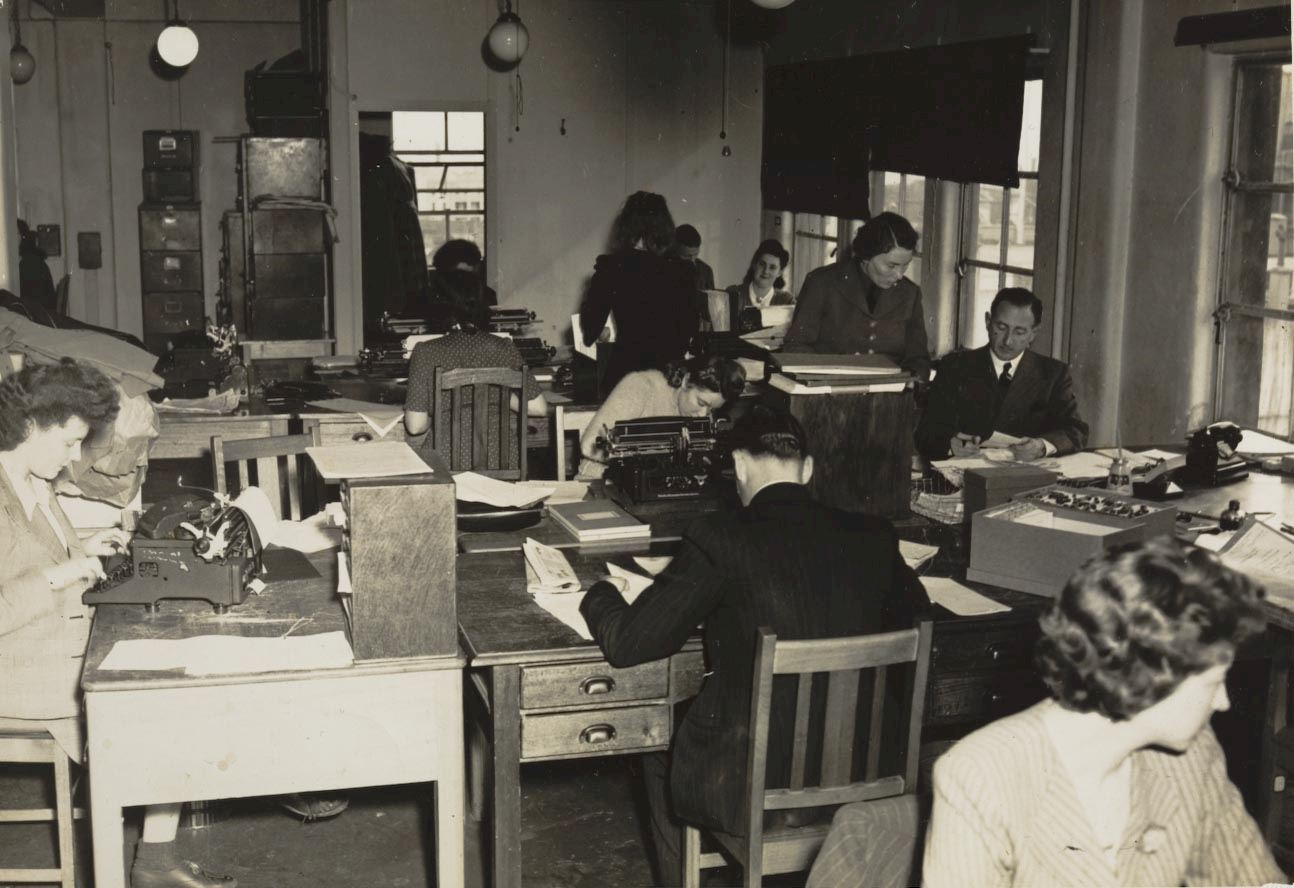
Men and women at work in the offices of the Netherlands Indies Government Information Service in the Temple Court building at 422 Collins Street, Melbourne, Australia.

The Netherlands Indies Government Information Service (NIGIS) was a civil secret service and propaganda organisation based in Australia, during and after World War II. NIGIS was affiliated with the Netherlands East Indies Forces Intelligence Service (NEFIS) and the Netherlands Indies Civil Administration (NICA).

Conrad Helfrich, commander of Dutch forces in the Netherlands East Indies, attempted to have NIGIS merged with NEFIS, for which he had responsibility. Helfrich's attempts were resisted by Hubertus van Mook, acting Governor-General of the Dutch East Indies, who wished NIGIS to retain its civil status rather than be absorbed by the military apparatus.

The service was established in April 1942, and was based in Melbourne, on the tenth floor of the Temple Court building at 422 Collins Street. In July 1944, Queen Wilhelmina of the Netherlands decreed that a government in exile be established at Camp Columbia, a former United States Army camp located in Wacol, Queensland. The Melbourne-based agencies NIGIS, NEFIS and NICA all moved to Wacol to support the new administration.

== Divisions and operations ==
NIGIS operated an English language radio service to monitor radio reports from the Netherlands East Indies during the Japanese occupation, and to broadcast "messages of hope" to residents of the colony living under Japanese rule.

From 1942 to 1945, NIGIS produced an Indonesian language newspaper called Penjoeloeh (Indonesian for "Torch"). The paper was produced, written and translated by Indonesian former internees of the Boven-Digoel prison camp. The service also produced a Dutch language journal called Oranje.

The service also employed special correspondents to write articles for the press, many of which were published verbatim in Australian newspapers. Correspondents such as Wolfe Preger for The Cairns Post wrote tales of Dutch bravery and Japanese villainy, as well as keeping Australian readers apprised of events in Europe, such as the Dutch resistance's acts of sabotage against the occupying Nazis.

NIGIS operated a film and photographic unit. The unit was linked with the Australian production company Southern Seas Productions headed by Fred Daniell and his son, cameraman John Daniell. Southern Seas produced several commissions for NIGIS, including the film Indonesian Harmony.

Directors of NIGIS included administrator Charles van der Plas and naval spokesman Huibert Quispel.

== Indonesian independence ==
After the end of the war and the surrender of the Japanese, NIGIS turned its focus to asserting Dutch sovereignty over the newly proclaimed independent Indonesia during the Indonesian National Revolution. NIGIS and its sister agencies claimed that the Netherlands supported Indonesian independence, however promoted the line in Australia that the Republic of Indonesia was a "Quisling Japanese-sponsored government".

When Australian maritime trade unions blockaded the Dutch shipping fleet in Australia in what was called the "Black Armada", NIGIS produced and distributed pamphlets claiming that the supplies to Indonesia were humanitarian in nature, and were not military materiel and personnel intended to suppress the independence movement.
