= Waterside Workers' Federation of Australia =

Former maritime trade union in Australia

- Waterside Workers' Federation of Australia
- Merged into: Maritime Union of Australia
- Founded: 1902
- Dissolved: 1993
- Location: Australia

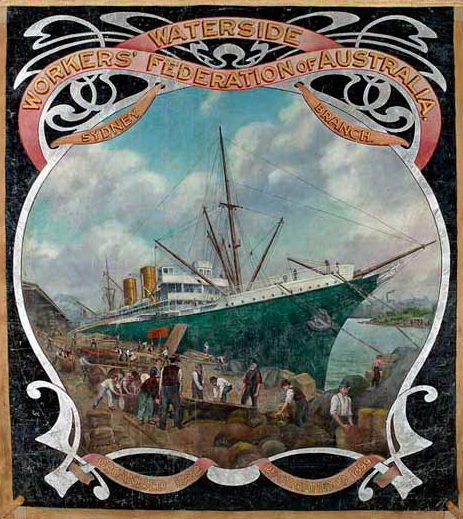
An early banner of the Sydney Branch of the Waterside Workers' Federation.

The Waterside Workers' Federation of Australia (WWF) was an Australian trade union that existed from 1902 to 1993. After a period of negotiations between other Australian maritime unions, it was federated in 1902 and first federally registered in 1907; its first general president was Billy Hughes.

In 1993 the WWF merged with the Seamen's Union of Australia to form the Maritime Union of Australia.

== History ==
=== Predecessors ===
The Waterside Workers' Federation of Australia traces its roots to the formation on the Australian waterfront in September 1872 of two unions in Sydney, the Labouring Men's Union of Circular Quay and the West Sydney Labouring Men's Association, which merged ten years later to form the Sydney Wharf Labourers' Union. In 1884 the Melbourne Wharf Labourers' Union was formed with the support of Melbourne Trades Hall representatives, after shipowners refused to allow waterfront workers to attend Eight-hour Day celebrations.

=== 1900 to 1945 ===
With Federation in 1901 and the impending introduction of an arbitration system, the national Waterside Workers' Federation of Australia was formed in 1902 under the leadership of Billy Hughes. Hughes had been a member of the federal parliament and became Prime Minister in 1915. Hughes was expelled from the Australian Labor Party and the union in 1916 over conscription in Australia and then formed the Nationalist Party to continue in government.

In 1917 the War Precautions Act 1914 was used to defeat a waterside workers nationwide strike by the passing of a regulation that deprived the Waterside Workers' Federation of preferences in seven of the busiest ports in Australia.

From about 1900 to the 1940s, work on Melbourne wharves was obtained through the bull system of labour hire where workers would be hired on a daily basis at a pickup point, and which was prone to corruption. (See Wailing Wall.) In Sydney, workers would walk from wharf to wharf in search of a job, often failing to find one. (See The Hungry Mile.) In 1917, waterside workers went on strike over the issue of the pickup and demanded the establishment of a single central pickup point at the Flinders Street Extension and that their remuneration should include the time taken to travel to and from their assigned ships. The impending arrival of strikebreakers from Sydney resulted in the calling off of the strike and abandonment of the dispute about a central pickup. The strike action led to the formation in 1917 of the Permanent & Casual Wharf Labourers Union of Australia in opposition to the Waterside Workers' Federation.

In 1928, the Nationalist government of Stanley Bruce amended the Commonwealth Conciliation and Arbitration Act to require industrial courts to consider the economic effects of its awards in addition to the welfare of workers. Immediate problems followed when a new award for waterside workers in 1928 worsened conditions for workers on economic grounds. The Waterside Workers Union again sought the abolition of the "bull" pickup system in a new award, but Justice George Beeby of the Commonwealth Court of Conciliation and Arbitration handed down a new award worse than the old, which included double pickup, cancelled the single pickup in those ports where it existed and removed restrictions on over-long shifts because they slowed ship turnaround times. Wharfies were to be paid less for evening and night shifts than they would for the horror shifts making these dangerously attractive.

All appeals for safeguards against excessive strain and overwork were rejected, as claimed for improved safety. The union rejected the award and organised strike action, which later resulted in riots and violence. Bruce pushed the Transport Workers Act through parliament in September, which gave the government unprecedented regulatory power in industrial relations. All waterfront workers now required federal licences, or "dog collars" as they were derisively known, to work. The act allowed the Commonwealth government to effectively control who worked on the docks and nearly destroyed the Waterside Workers' Federation, earning the government deep unpopularity among organised labour. Employment of non-union labour and members of the Permanent & Casual Wharf Labourers Union of Australia almost killed off the Waterside Workers' Federation. Bruce then called the 1928 election for November, reviving the "red scare" pitch for the campaign.

The stalwarts of the Waterside Workers' Federation were subject to official suspicion and scrutiny for many years. In the late 1930s union officials such as General Secretary Big Jim Healy and Brisbane Branch Secretary, Ted Englart, swallowed their pride and began recruiting members of their rival PCWLUA, which many union members regarded as "scabs". In 1936 the union shifted its head office from Melbourne to Sydney. In 1938 the union, through the efforts of Port Kembla Branch Secretary Ted Roach, played a key role in the Dalfram dispute which drew attention to Japan's undeclared war in China and famously led to Robert Menzies being known as Pig Iron Bob.

The union consolidated its strength with the labour shortages during World War II. During the Indonesian National Revolution, the WWF placed a "black ban" on Dutch colonial ships going to Indonesia as a show of solidarity.

=== 1945-1991 ===
In 1950, the WWF finally absorbed the Permanent & Casual Wharf Labourers Union of Australia as a distinct branch.

In 1954, the federal government led by Robert Menzies legislated for a committee of inquiry into the waterside industry by the Stevedoring Industry Act 1954, in an attempt by the government to end the WWF's monopoly on the supply of wharf labour. The Waterside Workers' Federation went on strike for a fortnight in November 1954. Although the changes were passed, the new legislation proved unworkable. In early 1955 a new recruiting agreement was drawn up protecting the union's right to recruit labour with Harold Holt, Minister for Labour and National Service. The government pressed ahead in 1956 with new legislation aimed at weakening the federation and the improvements it had gained in working conditions and safety provisions.

In the 1960s containerisation began to replace break bulk as the main means of transporting cargo, dramatically reducing the need for waterfront labour. Inspired by the example of the International Longshore and Warehouse Union in the United States, the WWF decided to co-operate with containerisation, in return for significant improvements in working conditions, such as permanency, an industry pension scheme and reduced working hours.

In 1971 the WWF affiliated with the International Transport Workers' Federation. In the same year the WWF absorbed the waterside section of the North Australian Workers' Union, which became its Darwin branch. In 1991, the WWF amalgamated with the Australian Foremen Stevedore Association but retained the name Waterside Workers' Federation of Australia.

== Officeholders ==
The Communist Party of Australia (CPA) was formed in October 1920, and achieved significant influence in the Australian trade union movement, especially in New South Wales. Members of the CPA would play a prominent role throughout the history of the Waterside Workers' Federation, including officials such as Big Jim Healy and Tas Bull, and the union was regarded as Communist-led.

Healy had joined the CPA in 1934, after he had been the Queensland branch president since 1929. He was elected national General Secretary in October 1937, a position he held until his death in 1961.

Bull was a one-time CPA member, then a member of the Communist Party of Australia (Marxist–Leninist) and later a member of the Australian Labor Party, and was General Secretary of the union from 1984 to 1992. With membership dwindling, partly as a result of containerisation, Bull steered the union towards an amalgamation with the Seamen's Union. He succeeding Charlie Fitzgibbon (1961–83) and Norm Docker (1983–84), another CPA member.

== Maritime Worker ==
In the 1930s, Jim Healy was instrumental in the publication of the WWF's national journal, the Maritime Worker, of which he was the first editor. Rupert Lockwood was a later editor.

== WWF Hall and Film Unit ==
Waterside Workers' Federation Film Unit was established in 1953 by Norma Disher, Keith Gow and Jock Levy. It was based at the Waterside Workers' Federation Hall located at 60 Sussex Street, which also became the venue for productions by the New Theatre from 1954 to 1962. In 1995 a production by Adelaide's Vitalstatistix theatre company was performed at this venue.

The film unit made several films on waterfront working conditions and events. Some of these films, such as The Hungry Mile, have become documentary classics. The union also commissioned artists, such as Roy Dalgarno, to document the people and conditions on the waterfront. After five years of production, the work of the unit ended in 1958.
