= Emmeline Pankhurst =

British suffragette (1858–1928)

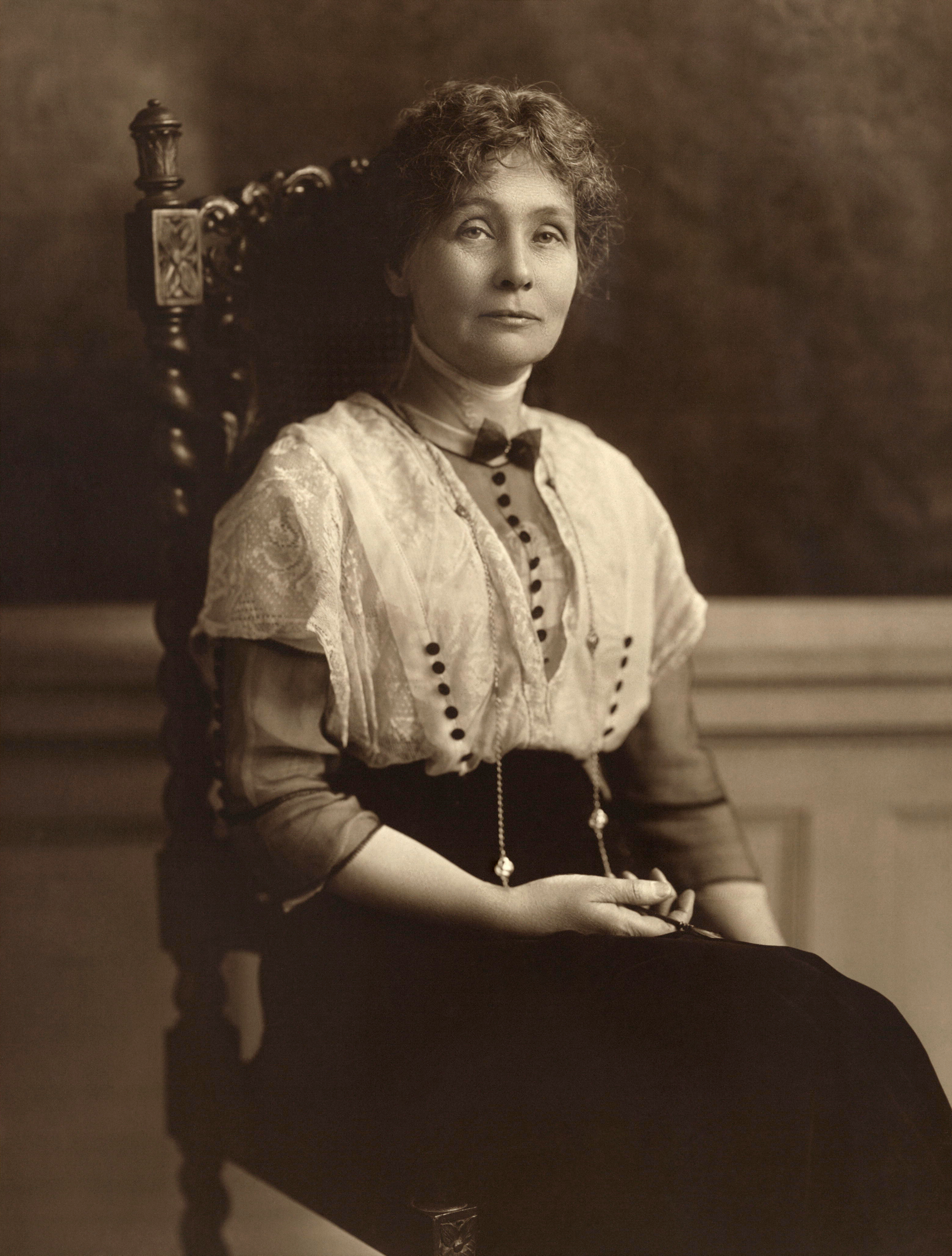
- Emmeline Pankhurst, c. 1913

Leader of the Women's Social and Political Union
- In office 1903–1917
- Preceded by: Position established
- Succeeded by: Position dissolved

Personal details
- Born: Emmeline Goulden; 15 July 1858 Moss Side, Manchester, England
- Died: 14 June 1928 (aged 69) Hampstead, London, England
- Monuments: Statue of Emmeline Pankhurst; Emmeline and Christabel Pankhurst Memorial
- Occupations: Political activist and suffragette
- Political party: Independent Labour Party (1890s); Women's Party (1917–1919); Conservative Party (1926–1928)
- Movement: Women's Social and Political Union
- Spouse: Richard Pankhurst (m. 1879; died 1898)
- Children: 5, including Christabel, Sylvia, and Adela
- Parents: Robert Goulden (father); Sophia Goulden (mother)
- Relatives: Mary Jane Clarke (sister); Richard Pankhurst (grandson); Helen Pankhurst (great-granddaughter); Alula Pankhurst (great-grandson)

Emmeline Pankhurst (/ˈpæŋkhɜːrst/; née Goulden; 15 July 1858 – 14 June 1928) was a British political activist who organised the British suffragette movement and helped women to win the right to vote in Great Britain and Ireland in 1918. In 1999, Time named her as one of the 100 Most Important People of the 20th Century, stating that "she shaped an idea of women for our time" and "shook society into a new pattern from which there could be no going back". She was widely criticised for her militant tactics, and historians disagree about their effectiveness, but her work is recognised as a crucial element in achieving women's suffrage in the United Kingdom.

Born in the Moss Side district of Manchester to politically active parents, Pankhurst was 14 when she was introduced to the women's suffrage movement. She founded and became involved with the Women's Franchise League, which advocated suffrage for both married and unmarried women. When that organisation broke apart, she tried to join the left-leaning Independent Labour Party through her friendship with socialist Keir Hardie but was initially refused membership by the local branch on account of her sex. While working as a Poor Law Guardian, she was shocked at the harsh conditions she encountered in Manchester's workhouses.

In 1903, Pankhurst founded the Women's Social and Political Union (WSPU), an all-women suffrage advocacy organisation dedicated to "deeds, not words". The group identified as independent from – and often in opposition to – political parties. It became known for physical confrontations: Its members smashed windows and assaulted police officers. Pankhurst, her daughters, and other WSPU activists received repeated prison sentences, where they staged hunger strikes to secure better conditions, and were often force-fed. As Pankhurst's eldest daughter Christabel took leadership of the WSPU, antagonism between the group and the government grew. Eventually, the group adopted bombings and arson as a tactic, and more moderate organisations spoke out against the Pankhurst family. In 1913, several prominent individuals left the WSPU, among them Pankhurst's younger daughters, Adela and Sylvia. Emmeline was so furious that she "gave [Adela] a ticket, £20, and a letter of introduction to a suffragette in Australia, and firmly insisted that she emigrate." Adela complied and the family rift was never healed. Sylvia became a socialist.

With the advent of the First World War, Emmeline and Christabel called an immediate halt to the freedom fighting in support of the British government's stand against the "German Peril". Emmeline organised and led a massive procession called the Women's Right to Serve demonstration to illustrate women's contribution to the war effort. Emmeline and Christabel urged women to aid industrial production and encouraged young men to fight.

In 1918, the Representation of the People Act granted votes to all men over the age of 21 and women over the age of 30. This discrepancy was intended to ensure that men did not become minority voters as a consequence of the huge number of deaths suffered during the First World War.

Pankhurst transformed the WSPU machinery into the Women's Party, which was dedicated to promoting women's equality in public life. In her later years, she became concerned with what she perceived as the menace posed by Bolshevism and joined the Conservative Party. She was selected as the Conservative candidate for Whitechapel and St Georges in 1927. She died on 14 June 1928, only weeks before the Conservative government's Representation of the People (Equal Franchise) Act 1928 extended the vote to all women over 21 years of age on 2 July 1928. Pankhurst was commemorated two years later with a statue in Victoria Tower Gardens, next to the Houses of Parliament.

== Early life ==
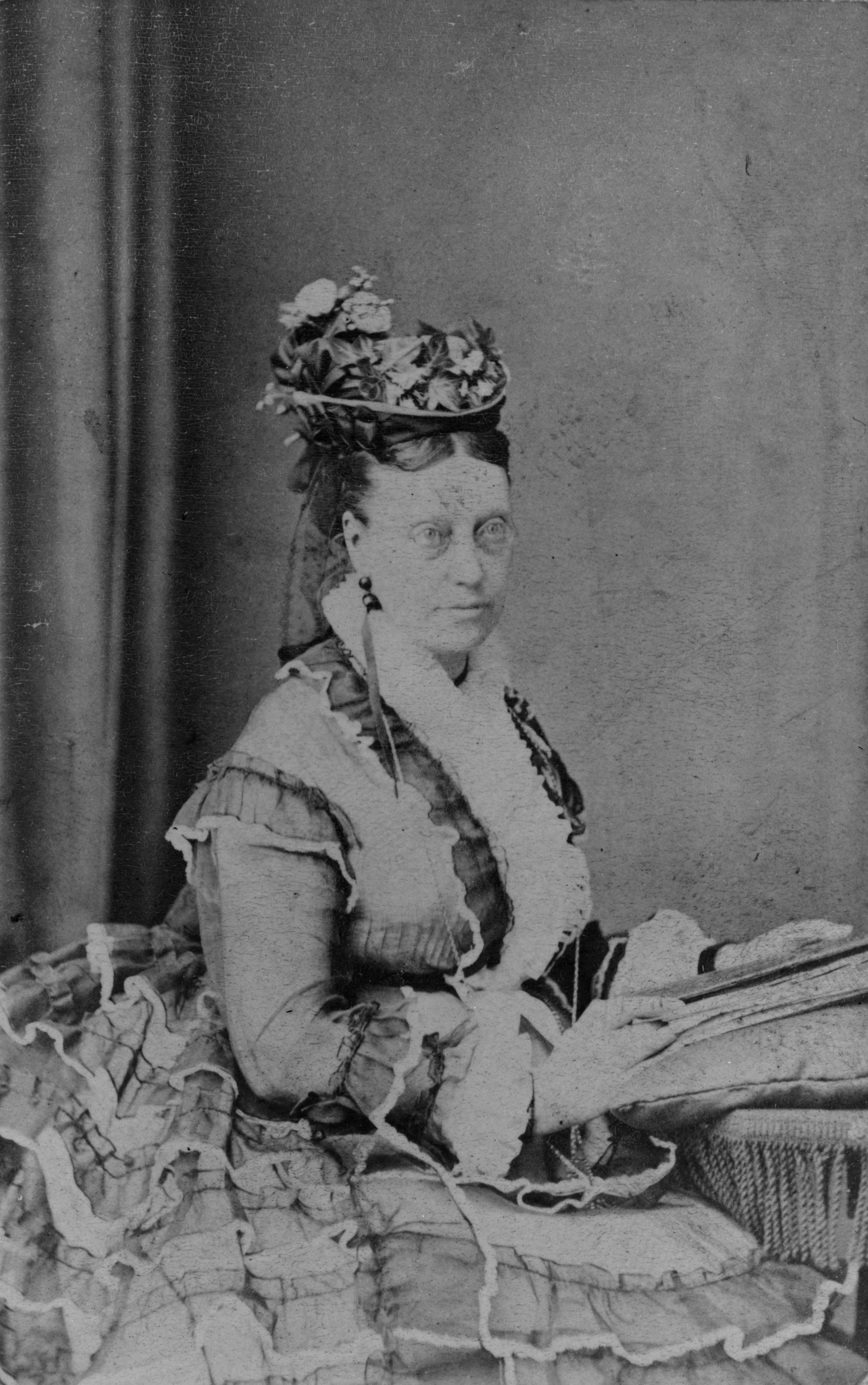
Lydia Becker was an early influence on Pankhurst and may have been enamoured of Pankhurst's father

Emmeline Goulden was born on Sloan Street in the Moss Side district of Manchester on 15 July 1858. Although her birth certificate says otherwise, she believed and later claimed her birthday was a day earlier, on Bastille Day (14 July). Most biographies, including those written by her daughters, repeat this claim. Feeling a kinship with the female revolutionaries who stormed the Bastille, Pankhurst said in 1908: "I have always thought that the fact that I was born on that day had some kind of influence over my life." The family into which she was born had been steeped in political agitation for generations; her mother, Sophia, was a Manx woman from the Isle of Man who was descended from men who were charged with social unrest and slander.

In 1881, the Isle of Man became the first place in the British Isles to grant women the right to vote in their national elections (the Isle does not return members to the UK Parliament). Her father, Robert Goulden, was a self-made man – working his way from errand boy to manufacturer – from a humble Manchester family with its own background of political activity. Robert's mother, a fustian cutter, worked with the Anti-Corn Law League, and his father was press-ganged into the Royal Navy and present at the Peterloo massacre, when cavalry charged and broke up a crowd demanding parliamentary reform.

The Gouldens' first son died at the age of three, but they had 10 other children; Emmeline was the eldest of five daughters. Soon after her birth, the family moved to Seedley, an inner city suburb of Salford, where her father had co-founded a small business. Goulden was also active in local politics, serving for several years on the Salford town council. He was an enthusiastic supporter of dramatic organisations including the Manchester Athenaeum and the Dramatic Reading Society. He owned a theatre in Salford for several years, where he played the leads in several Shakespeare plays. Emmeline absorbed an appreciation of drama and theatrics from her father, which she used later in social activism.

The Gouldens included their children in social activism. To support abolitionism, Robert welcomed American abolitionist Henry Ward Beecher when he visited Manchester. Sophia used the novel Uncle Tom's Cabin, written by Beecher's sister Harriet Beecher Stowe, as a regular source of bedtime stories for her sons and daughters. In her 1914 autobiography My Own Story, Emmeline recalls visiting a bazaar at a young age to collect money for newly freed slaves in the U.S.

Emmeline began to read when she was very young, with one source claiming that she was reading as early as the age of three. She read the Odyssey at the age of nine and enjoyed the works of John Bunyan, especially his 1678 story The Pilgrim's Progress. Another of her favourite books was Thomas Carlyle's three-volume treatise The French Revolution: A History, and she later said the work "remained all [her] life a source of inspiration".

Despite her avid consumption of books, she was not given the educational advantages enjoyed by her brothers. Their parents believed that the girls needed most to learn the art of "making home attractive" and other skills desired by potential husbands. The Gouldens deliberated carefully about future plans for their sons' education, but they expected their daughters to marry young and avoid paid work. Although they supported women's suffrage and the general advancement of women in society, the Gouldens believed their daughters incapable of the goals of their male peers. Feigning sleep one evening as her father came into her bedroom, Goulden heard him pause and say to himself, "What a pity she wasn't born a lad."

It was through her parents' interest in women's suffrage that Goulden was first introduced to the subject. Her mother received and read the Women's Suffrage Journal, and Goulden grew fond of its editor Lydia Becker. At the age of 14, she returned home from school one day to find her mother on her way to a public meeting about women's voting rights. After learning that Becker would be speaking, she insisted on attending. Goulden was enthralled by Becker's address and later wrote, "I left the meeting a conscious and confirmed suffragist." A year later, she arrived in Paris to attend the École Normale de Neuilly. The school provided its female pupils with classes in chemistry and bookkeeping, in addition to traditionally feminine arts such as embroidery. Her roommate was Noémie, the daughter of Victor Henri Rochefort, who had been imprisoned in New Caledonia for his support of the Paris Commune. The girls shared tales of their parents' political exploits and remained good friends for years. Emmeline was so fond of Noémie and the school that she returned with her sister Mary Jane as a parlour boarder after graduating. Noémie had married a Swiss painter and quickly found a suitable French husband for her English friend. When Robert refused to provide a dowry for his daughter, the man withdrew his offer of marriage and Emmeline returned, miserable, to Manchester.

== Marriage and family ==
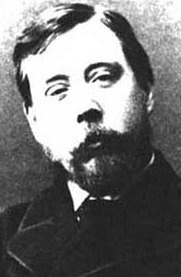
Richard Pankhurst first caught Goulden's eye when she spied his "beautiful hand" opening the door of a taxi as he arrived at a public meeting in 1878

In the autumn of 1878, at the age of 20, Emmeline met and began a relationship with Richard Pankhurst, a barrister who had advocated women's suffrage – and other causes, including freedom of speech and education reform – for years. Richard, 44 years old when they met, had earlier resolved to remain a bachelor to better serve the public. Their mutual affection was powerful, but the couple's happiness was diminished by the death of his mother the following year. Sophia Jane Goulden chastised her daughter for "throwing herself" at Richard and advised her without success to exhibit more aloofness. Emmeline suggested to Richard that they avoid the legal formalities of marriage by entering into a free union; he objected on the grounds that she would be excluded from political life as an unmarried woman. He noted that his colleague Elizabeth Wolstenholme Elmy had faced social condemnation before she formalised her marriage to Ben Elmy. Emmeline Goulden agreed, and they had their wedding in St Luke's Church, Pendleton on 18 December 1879.

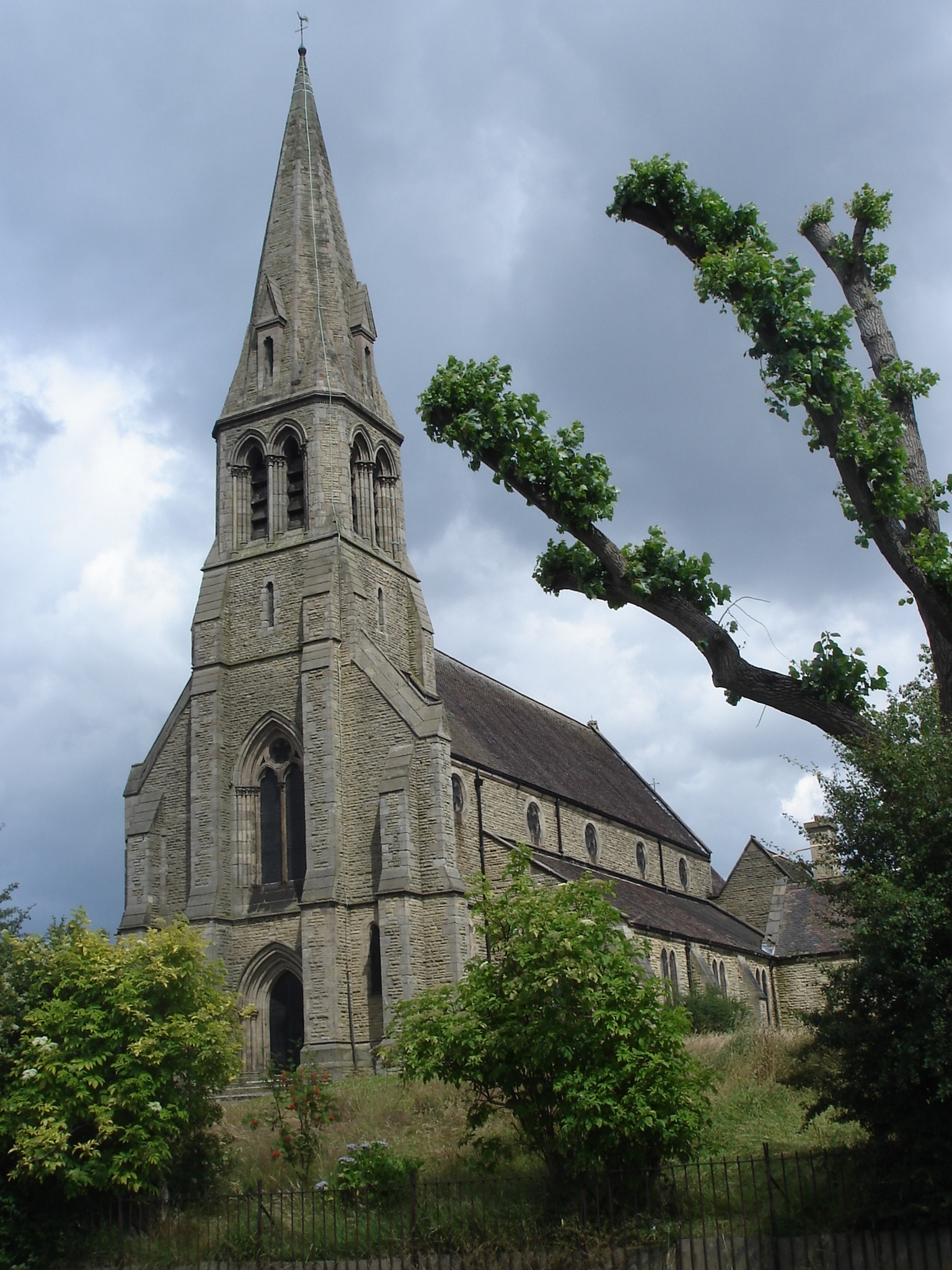
St Luke's Church, Pendleton

During the 1880s, living at the Goulden cottage with her parents in Seedley, then at 1 Drayton Terrace Chester Rd Old Trafford (1881 census Stretford) opposite Richard's parents' home, Emmeline Pankhurst tended to her husband and children, but still devoted time to political activities. Although she gave birth to five children in ten years, both she and Richard believed that she should not be "a household machine".

A butler was hired to help with the children as Pankhurst involved herself with the Women's Suffrage Society. Their daughter Christabel was born on 22 September 1880, less than a year after the wedding. Pankhurst gave birth to another daughter, Estelle Sylvia, in 1882, and their son Henry Francis Robert, nicknamed Frank, in 1884. Soon afterwards Richard Pankhurst left the Liberal Party. He began expressing more radical socialist views and argued a case in court against several wealthy businessmen. These actions roused Robert Goulden's ire and the mood in the house became tense. In 1885, the Pankhursts moved to Chorlton-on-Medlock, and their daughter Adela was born. They moved to London the following year, where Richard ran unsuccessfully for election as a Member of Parliament and Pankhurst opened a small fabric shop called Emerson and Company, together with her sister Mary Jane.

In 1888, Pankhurst's son Frank developed diphtheria. He died on 11 September. Overwhelmed with grief, Pankhurst commissioned two portraits of the dead boy but was unable to look at them and hid them in a bedroom cupboard. The family concluded that a faulty drainage system at the back of their house had caused their son's illness. Pankhurst blamed the poor conditions of the neighbourhood, and the family moved to a more affluent middle class district at Russell Square. She was soon pregnant once more and declared that the child was "Frank coming again." She gave birth to a son on 7 July 1889 and named him Henry Francis in honour of his deceased brother.

Pankhurst made their Russell Square home into a centre for political intellectuals and activists, including, "Socialists, Protesters, Anarchists, Suffragists, Free Thinkers, Radicals and Humanitarians of all schools." She took pleasure in decorating the house – especially with furnishings from Asia – and clothing the family in tasteful apparel. Her daughter Sylvia later wrote: "Beauty and appropriateness in her dress and household appointments seemed to her at all times an indispensable setting to public work."

The Pankhursts hosted a variety of guests including Indian MP Dadabhai Naoroji, socialist activists Herbert Burrows and Annie Besant, and French anarchist Louise Michel.

== Women's Franchise League ==
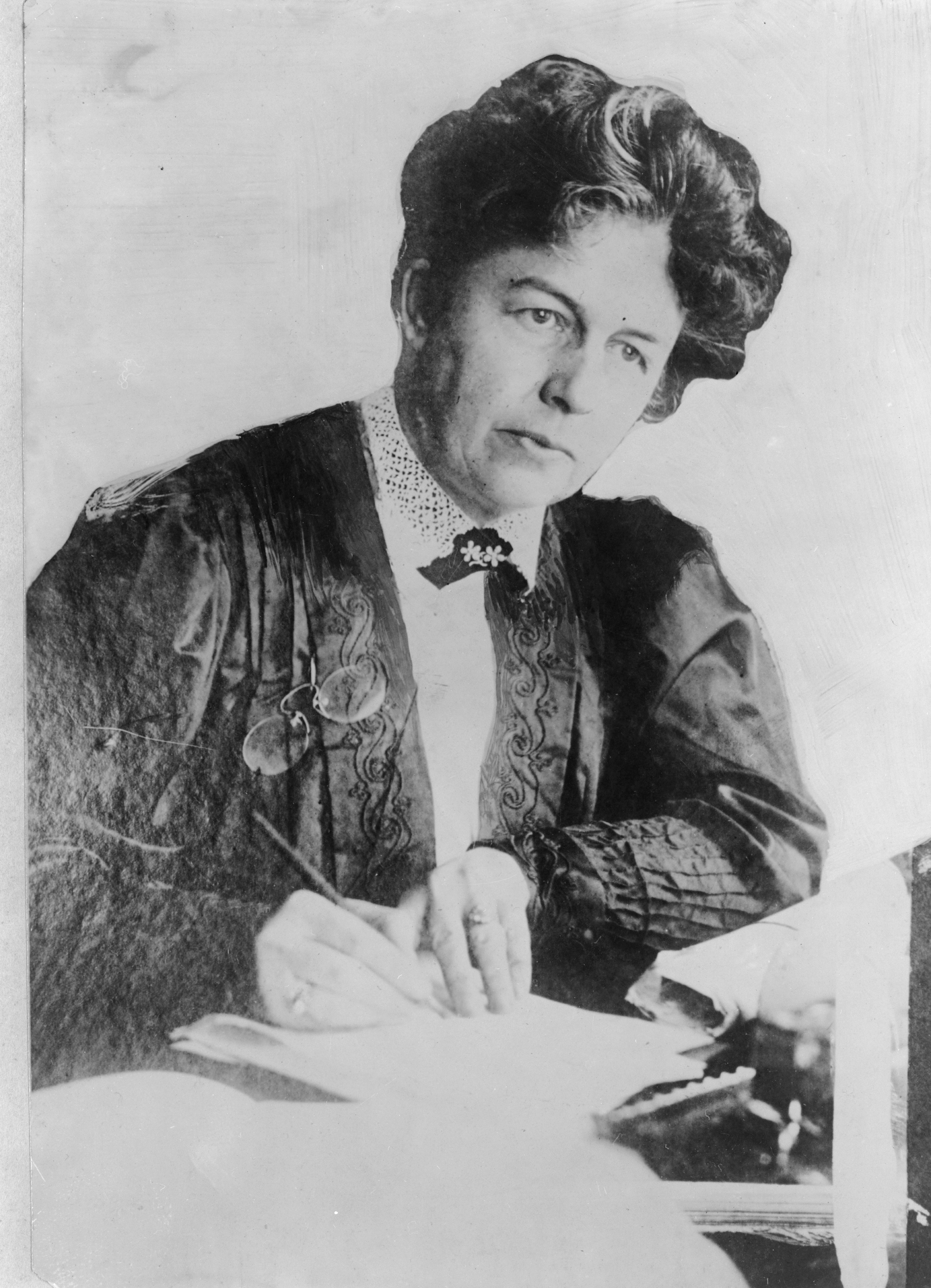
Harriot Eaton Stanton Blatch, daughter of US suffragist Elizabeth Cady Stanton, became friends with Pankhurst through their work in the Women's Franchise League

In 1888, Britain's first nationwide coalition of groups advocating women's right to vote, the National Society for Women's Suffrage (NSWS), split after a majority of members decided to accept organisations affiliated with political parties. Angry at this decision, some of the group's leaders, including Lydia Becker and Millicent Fawcett, stormed out of the meeting and created an alternative organisation committed to the "old rules," called the Great College Street Society after the location of its headquarters. Pankhurst aligned herself with the "new rules" group, which became known as the Parliament Street Society (PSS).

Some members of the PSS favoured a piecemeal approach to gaining the vote. Because it was often assumed that married women did not need the vote since their husbands "voted for them," some PSS members felt that the vote for single women and widows was a practical step along the path to full suffrage. When the reluctance within the PSS to advocate on behalf of married women became clear, Pankhurst and her husband helped organise another new group dedicated to voting rights for all women – married and unmarried.

The inaugural meeting of the Women's Franchise League (WFL) was held on 25 July 1889, at the Pankhurst home in Russell Square. Early members of the WFL included Josephine Butler, leader of the Ladies National Association for the Repeal of the Contagious Diseases Acts; the Pankhursts' friend Elizabeth Clarke Wolstenholme-Elmy; and Harriot Eaton Stanton Blatch, daughter of US suffragist Elizabeth Cady Stanton.

The WFL was considered a radical organisation, since in addition to women's suffrage it supported equal rights for women in the areas of divorce and inheritance. It also advocated trade unionism and sought alliances with socialist organisations. The more conservative group that emerged from the NSWS split spoke out against what they called the "extreme left" wing of the movement. The WFL reacted by ridiculing the "Spinster Suffrage party" and insisting that a wider assault on social inequity was required. The group's radicalism caused some members to leave; both Blatch and Elmy resigned from the WFL. The group fell apart one year later.

== Independent Labour Party ==
Pankhurst's shop never succeeded and he had trouble attracting business in London. With the family's finances in jeopardy, Richard travelled regularly to northwest England, where most of his clients were. In 1893 the Pankhursts closed the store and returned to Manchester. They stayed for several months in the seaside town of Southport, then moved briefly to the village of Disley and finally settled into a house in Manchester's Victoria Park. The girls were enrolled in Manchester Girls' High School, where they felt confined by the large student population and strictly regimented schedule.

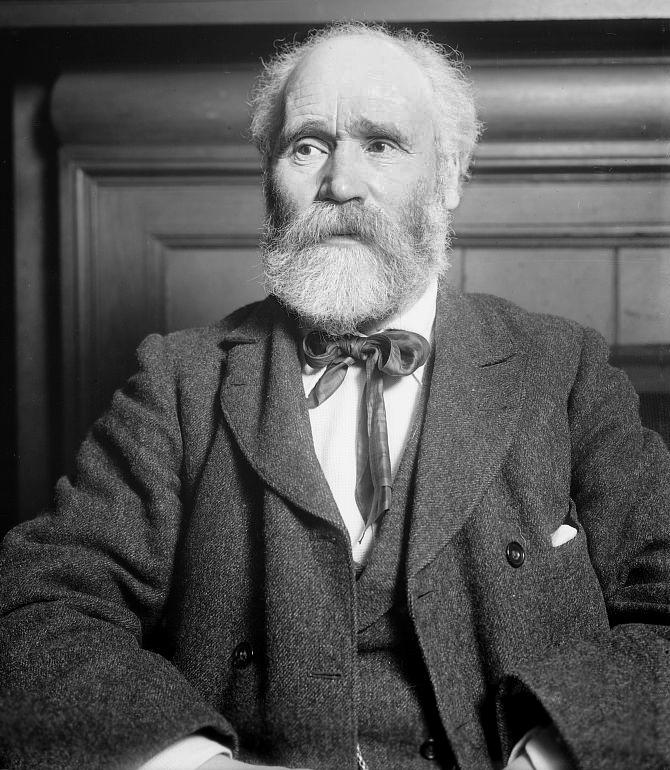
Keir Hardie worked with the Pankhursts on a variety of political issues and later became a very close friend of Sylvia's

Pankhurst began to work with several political organisations, distinguishing herself for the first time as an activist in her own right and gaining respect in the community. One biographer describes this period as her "emergence from Richard's shadow." In addition to her work on behalf of women's suffrage, she became active with the Women's Liberal Federation (WLF), an auxiliary of the Liberal Party. She quickly grew disenchanted with the group's moderate positions, however, especially its unwillingness to support Irish Home Rule and the aristocratic leadership of Archibald Primrose.

In 1888 Pankhurst had met and befriended Keir Hardie, a socialist from Scotland. He was elected to parliament in 1891 and two years later helped to create the Independent Labour Party (ILP). Excited about the range of issues which the ILP pledged to confront, Pankhurst resigned from the WFL and applied to join the ILP. The local branch refused her admission on the grounds of her sex, but she eventually joined the ILP nationally. Christabel later wrote of her mother's enthusiasm for the party and its organising efforts: "In this movement she hoped there might be the means of righting every political and social wrong."

One of her first activities with the ILP found Pankhurst distributing food to poor men and women through the Committee for the Relief of the Unemployed. In December 1894 she was elected to the position of Poor Law Guardian in Chorlton-on-Medlock. She was appalled by the conditions she witnessed first-hand in the Manchester workhouse:

The first time I went into the place I was horrified to see little girls seven and eight years old on their knees scrubbing the cold stones of the long corridors ... bronchitis was epidemic among them most of the time ... I found that there were pregnant women in that workhouse, scrubbing floors, doing the hardest kind of work, almost until their babies came into the world ... Of course the babies are very badly protected ... These poor, unprotected mothers and their babies I am sure were potent factors in my education as a militant.

Pankhurst immediately began to change these conditions, and established herself as a successful voice of reform on the Board of Guardians. Her chief opponent was a passionate man named Mainwaring, known for his rudeness. Recognising that his loud anger was hurting his chances of persuading those aligned with Pankhurst, he kept a note nearby during meetings: "Keep your temper!"

After helping her husband with another unsuccessful parliamentary campaign, Pankhurst faced legal troubles in 1896 when she and two men violated a court order against ILP meetings at Boggart Hole Clough. With Richard's volunteering his time as legal counsel, they refused to pay fines, and the two men spent a month in prison. The punishment was never ordered for Pankhurst, however, possibly because the magistrate feared public backlash against the imprisonment of a woman so respected in the community. Asked by an ILP reporter if she were prepared to spend time in prison, Pankhurst replied: "Oh, yes, quite. It wouldn't be so very dreadful, you know, and it would be a valuable experience." Although ILP meetings were eventually permitted, the episode was a strain on Pankhurst's health and caused loss of income for their family.

=== Richard's death ===
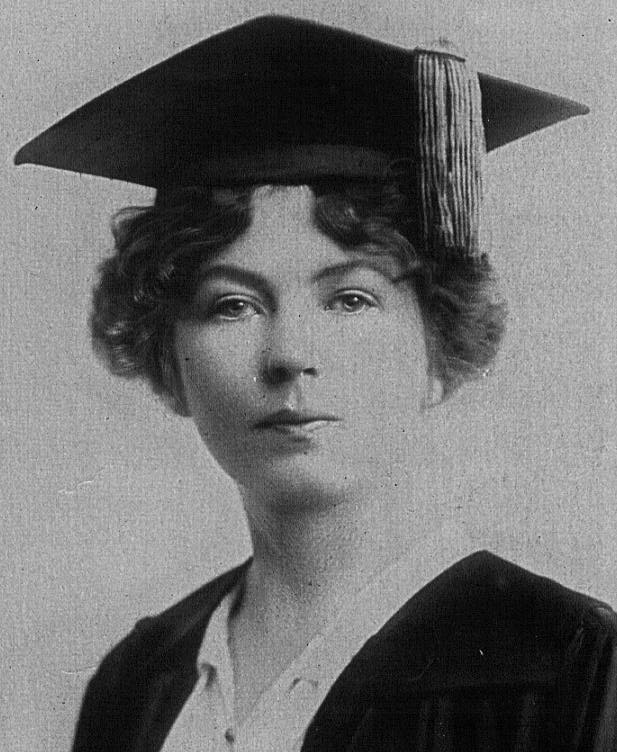
Christabel Pankhurst, often called the favourite child, spent almost 15 years working by her mother's side for women's suffrage

During the struggle at Boggart Hole Clough, Richard Pankhurst began to experience severe stomach pains. He had developed a gastric ulcer, and his health deteriorated in 1897. The family moved briefly to Mobberley, with the hope that country air would help his condition. He soon felt well again, and the family returned to Manchester in the autumn. In the summer of 1898, he suffered a sudden relapse. Emmeline Pankhurst had taken their oldest daughter Christabel to Corsier, Switzerland, to visit her old friend Noémie. A telegram arrived from Richard, reading: "I am not well. Please come home, my love." Leaving Christabel with Noémie, Pankhurst returned immediately to England. On 5 July, while on a train from London to Manchester, she noticed a newspaper announcing the death of Richard Pankhurst.

The loss of her husband left Pankhurst with new responsibilities and a significant amount of debt. She moved the family to a smaller house at 62 Nelson Street, resigned from the Board of Guardians, and was given a paid position as Registrar of Births and Deaths in Chorlton. This work gave her more insight into the conditions of women in the region. She wrote in her autobiography: "They used to tell me their stories, dreadful stories some of them, and all of them pathetic with that patient and uncomplaining pathos of poverty." Her observations of the differences between the lives of men and women, for example in relation to illegitimacy, reinforced her conviction that women needed the right to vote before their conditions could improve. In 1900 she was elected to the Manchester School Board and saw new examples of women suffering unequal treatment and limited opportunities. During this time she also re-opened her store, with the hope that it would provide additional income for the family.

The individual identities of the Pankhurst children began to emerge around the time of their father's death. Before long they were all involved in the struggle for women's suffrage. Christabel enjoyed a privileged status among the daughters, as Sylvia noted in 1931: "She was our mother's favourite; we all knew it, and I, for one, never resented the fact." Christabel did not share her mother's fervour for political work, until she befriended the suffrage activists Esther Roper and Eva Gore-Booth. She soon became involved with the suffrage movement and joined her mother at speaking events.

Sylvia took lessons from a local artist and soon received a scholarship to the Manchester School of Art. She went on to study art in Florence and Venice. The younger children, Adela and Harry, had difficulty finding a path for their studies. Adela was sent to a local boarding school, where she was cut off from her friends and contracted head lice. Harry also had difficulty at school; he suffered from measles and vision problems.

== Women's Social and Political Union/WSPU ==
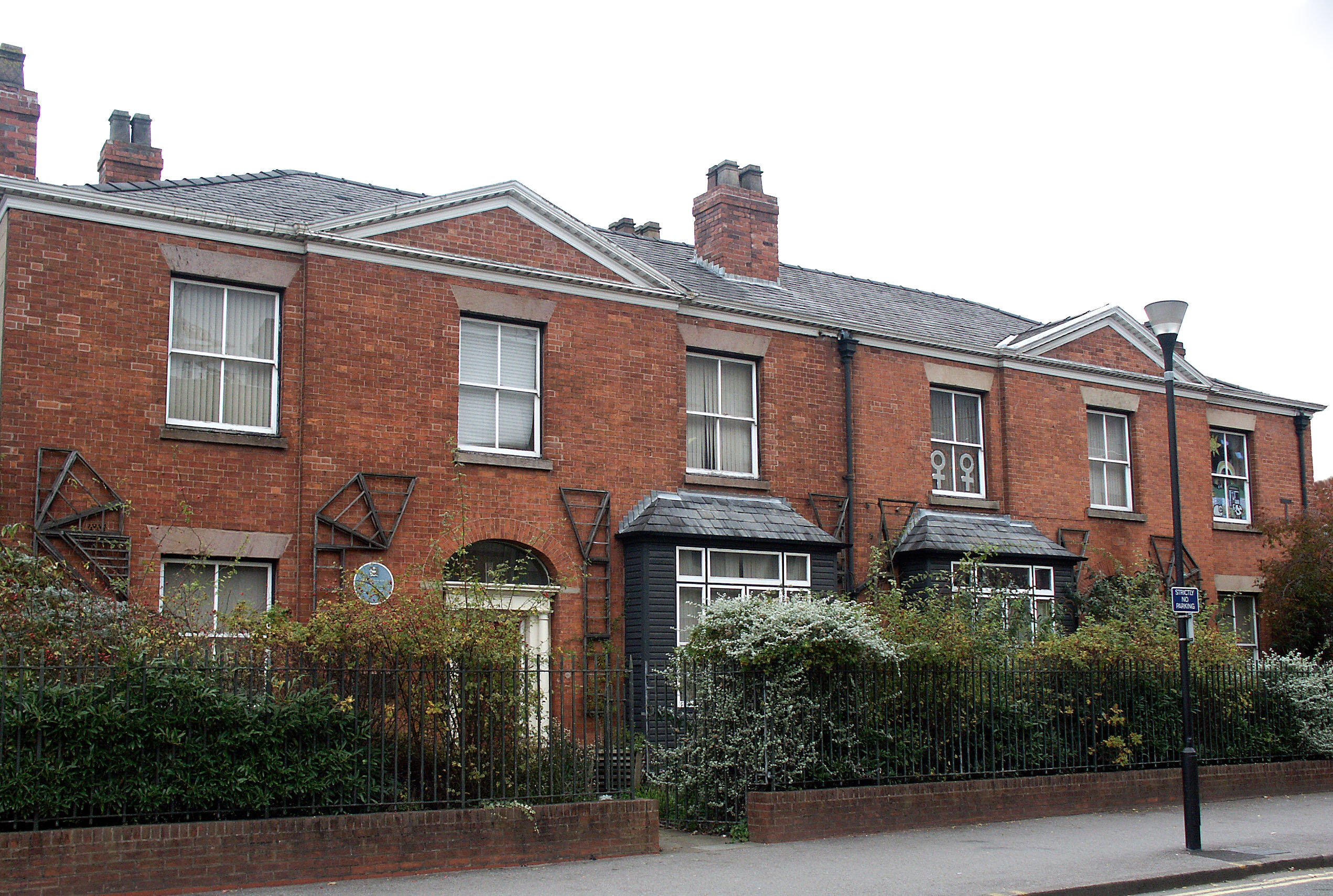
The WSPU. It was founded at Pankhurst's home at 62 Nelson Street, Manchester in 1903. The Grade II* Victoria Villa is now home to the Pankhurst Centre

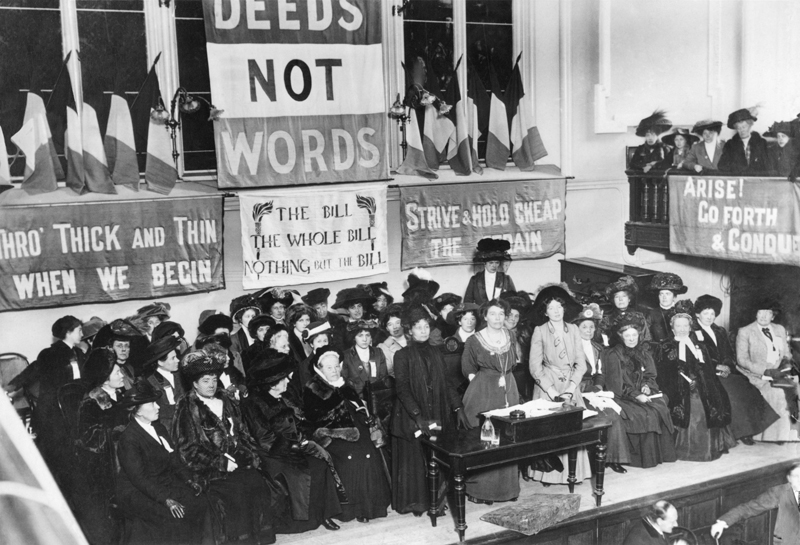
The Women's Social and Political Union became known for its militant activity. Pankhurst once said: "The condition of our sex is so deplorable that it is our duty to break the law in order to call attention to the reasons why we do"

By 1903, Pankhurst believed that years of moderate speeches and promises about women's suffrage from members of parliament (MPs) had yielded no progress. Although suffrage bills in 1870, 1886, and 1897 had shown promise, each was defeated. She doubted that political parties, with their many agenda items, would ever make women's suffrage a priority. She broke with the Independent Labour Party (ILP) when it refused to focus on votes for women. It was necessary to abandon the patient tactics of existing advocacy groups, she believed, in favour of more militant actions. Thus on 10 October 1903 Pankhurst and several colleagues founded the Women's Social and Political Union (WSPU), an organisation open only to women and focused on direct action to win the vote. "Deeds," she wrote later, "not words, was to be our permanent motto." The WSPU confined its membership to women – men could not become members.

The group's early militancy took non-violent forms. In addition to making speeches and gathering petition signatures, the WSPU organised rallies and published a newsletter called Votes for Women. The group convened a series of "Women's Parliaments" for example, in Caxton Hall, to coincide with official government sessions. After a suffrage measure was talked out on the floor of the House of Commons in 1904, Pankhurst organised an impromptu protest outside, which was broken up by the Police and moved to the gates of Westminster Abbey. When a bill for women's suffrage was filibustered on 12 May 1905, Pankhurst and other WSPU members began another loud protest outside the Parliament building. Police immediately forced them away from the building, where they regrouped and demanded passage of the bill. Although the bill was never resurrected, Pankhurst considered it a successful demonstration of militancy's power to capture attention. Pankhurst declared in 1906: "We are at last recognized as a political party; we are now in the swim of politics, and are a political force."

Before long, all three of her daughters became active with the WSPU. Christabel was arrested after spitting at a policeman during a meeting of the Liberal Party in October 1905; Adela and Sylvia were arrested a year later during a protest outside Parliament. Pankhurst was arrested for the first time in February 1908, when she tried to enter Parliament to deliver a protest resolution to Prime Minister H. H. Asquith. She was charged with obstruction and, after she refused the conditions of the binding-over order offered to her (£20 surety for 12 months’ good behaviour), was sentenced to six weeks in prison. She spoke out against the conditions of her confinement, including vermin, meagre food, and the "civilised torture of solitary confinement and absolute silence" to which she and others were ordered. Pankhurst saw imprisonment as a means to publicise the urgency of women's suffrage; in June 1909 she struck a police officer twice in the face to ensure she would be arrested. Pankhurst was arrested seven times before women's suffrage was approved. During her trial on 21 October 1908 she told the court: "We are here not because we are law-breakers; we are here in our efforts to become law-makers."

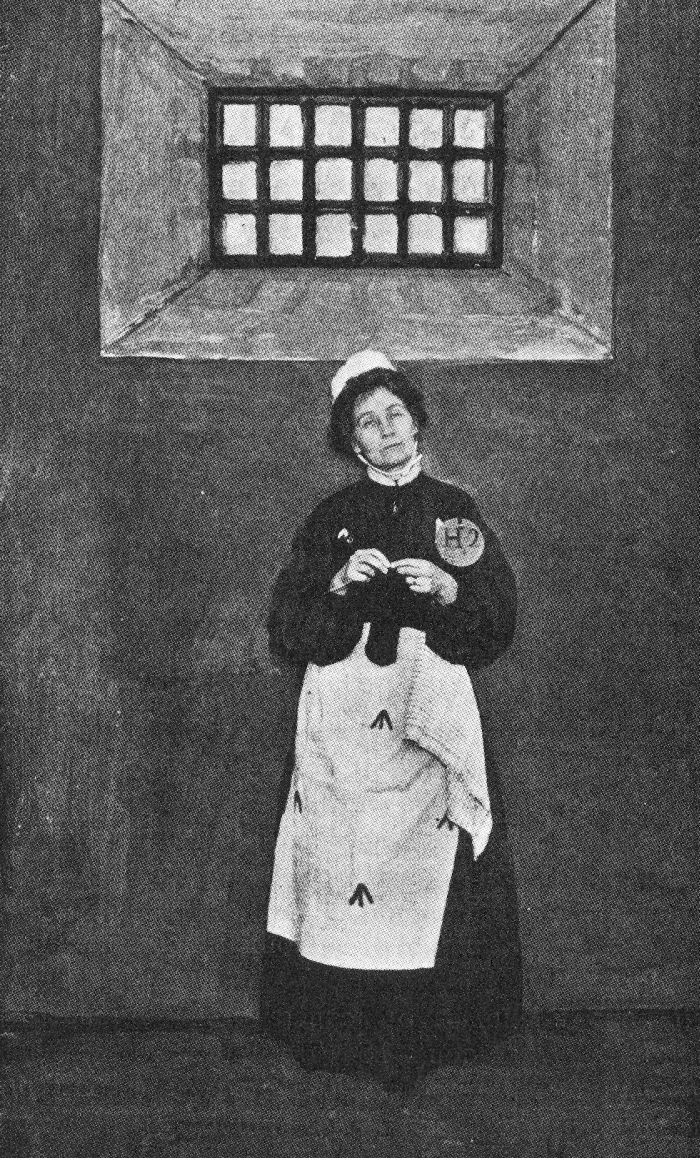
Pankhurst (wearing prison clothes) described her first incarceration as: "like a human being in the process of being turned into a wild beast"

The exclusive focus of the WSPU on votes for women was another hallmark of its militancy. While other organisations agreed to work with individual political parties, the WSPU insisted on separating itself from – and in many cases opposing – parties which did not make women's suffrage a priority. The group protested against all candidates belonging to the party of the ruling government since it refused to pass women's suffrage legislation. This brought them into immediate conflict with Liberal Party organisers, particularly since many Liberal candidates supported women's suffrage. (One early target of WSPU opposition was future Prime Minister Winston Churchill; his opponent attributed Churchill's defeat in part to "those ladies who are sometimes laughed at.")

Members of the WSPU were sometimes heckled and derided for spoiling elections for Liberal candidates. On 18 January 1908, Pankhurst and her associate Nellie Martel were attacked by an all-male crowd of Liberal supporters who blamed the WSPU for costing them a recent by-election to the Conservative candidate. The men threw clay, rotten eggs, and stones packed in snow; the women were beaten and Pankhurst's ankle was severely bruised. Similar tensions later formed with Labour. Until party leaders made the vote for women a priority, however, the WSPU vowed to continue its militant activism. Pankhurst and others in the union saw party politics as distracting to the goal of women's suffrage and criticised other organisations for putting party loyalty ahead of women's votes.

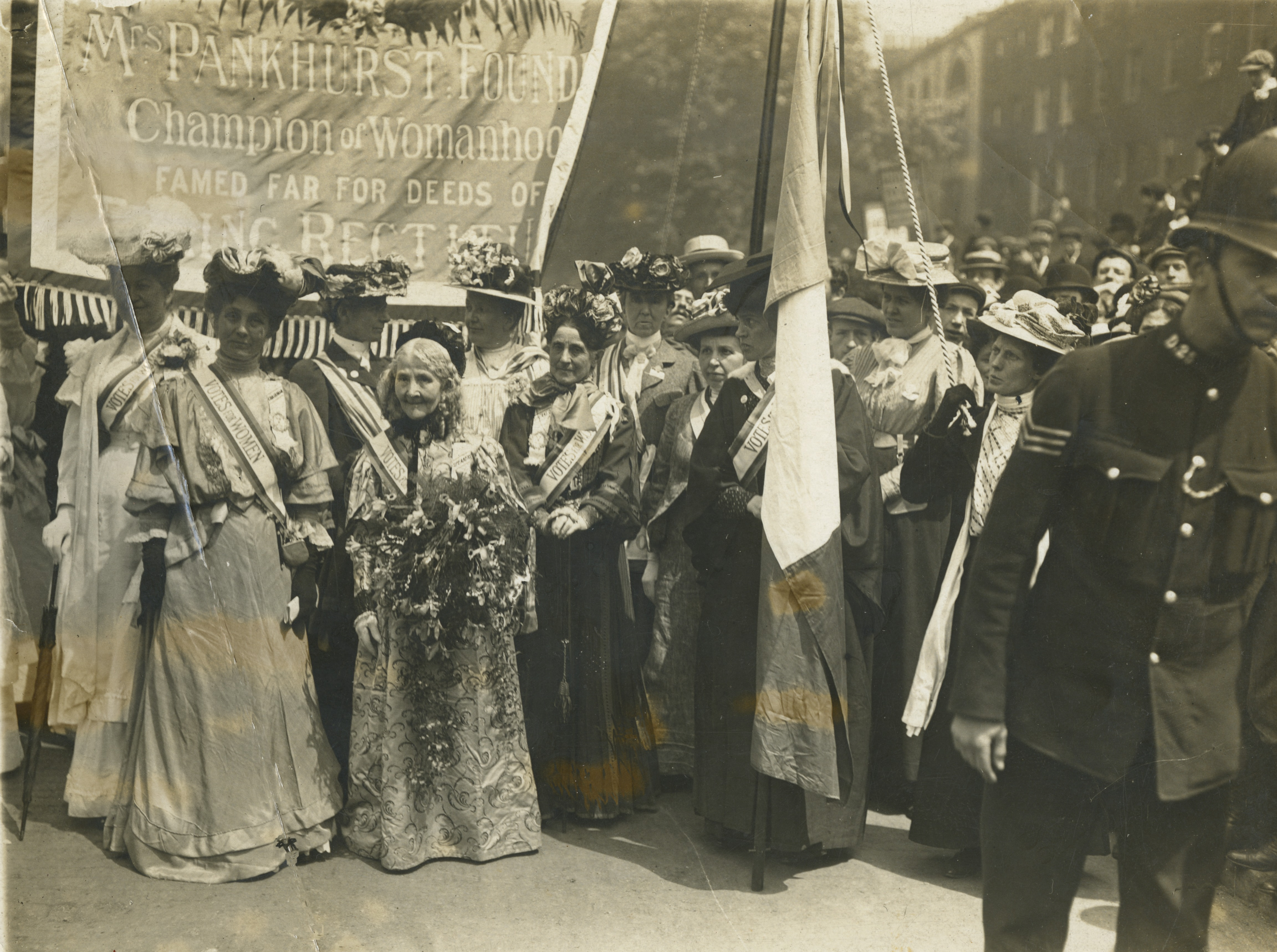
Pankhurst and Elizabeth Wolstenholme-Elmy in 1908

As the WSPU gained recognition and notoriety for its actions, Pankhurst resisted efforts to democratise the organisation itself. In 1907 a small group of members led by Teresa Billington-Greig called for more involvement from the rank-and-file suffragettes at the union's annual meetings. In response, Pankhurst announced at a WSPU meeting that elements of the organisation's constitution relating to decision-making were void and cancelled the annual meetings. She also insisted that a small committee chosen by the members in attendance be allowed to co-ordinate WSPU activities. Pankhurst and her daughter Christabel were chosen (along with Mabel Tuke and Emmeline Pethick Lawrence) as members of the new committee. Frustrated, several members including Billington-Greig and Charlotte Despard quit to form their own organisation, the Women's Freedom League. In her 1914 autobiography Pankhurst dismissed criticism of the WSPU's leadership structure:

if at any time a member, or a group of members, loses faith in our policy; if any one begins to suggest that some other policy ought to be substituted, or if she tries to confuse the issue by adding other policies, she ceases at once to be a member. Autocratic? Quite so. But, you may object, a suffrage organisation ought to be democratic. Well the members of the W.S.P.U. do not agree with you. We do not believe in the effectiveness of the ordinary suffrage organisation. The W.S.P.U. is not hampered by a complexity of rules. We have no constitution and by-laws; nothing to be amended or tinkered with or quarrelled over at an annual meeting ... The W.S.P.U. is simply a suffrage army in the field.

=== Tactical intensification ===
On 21 June 1908, 500,000 activists rallied in Hyde Park to demand votes for women. This day is the beginning of "Women' s Sunday". It was organised by the WSPN, the massive demonstration for women's suffrage saw thousands march in seven processions all over London, gathering for a day of peaceful protest. Asquith and leading MPs responded with indifference. Angered by this intransigence and abusive police activity, some WSPU members increased the severity of their actions. Soon after the rally, twelve women gathered in Parliament Square and tried to deliver speeches for women's suffrage. Police officers seized several of the speakers and pushed them into a crowd of opponents who had gathered nearby. Frustrated, two WSPU members – Edith New and Mary Leigh – went to 10 Downing Street and hurled rocks at the windows of the Prime Minister's home. They insisted their act was independent of the WSPU command, but Pankhurst expressed her approval of the action. When a magistrate sentenced New and Leigh to two months' imprisonment, Pankhurst reminded the court of how various male political agitators had broken windows to win legal and civil rights throughout Britain's history.

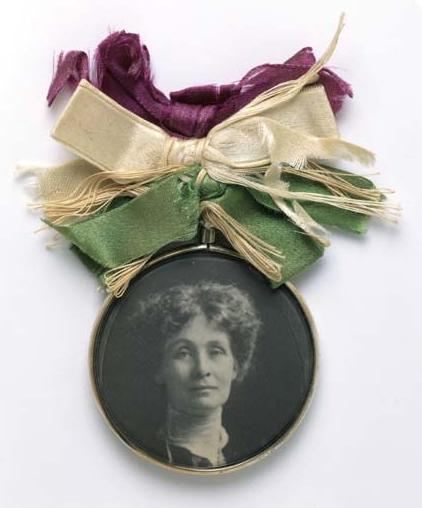
Portrait badge of Emmeline Pankhurst – c. 1909 – Sold in large numbers by the WSPU to raise funds for its cause – Museum of London

In 1909 the hunger strike was added to the WSPU's repertoire of resistance. On 24 June Marion Wallace Dunlop was arrested for writing an excerpt from the Bill of Rights (1688 or 1689) on a wall in the House of Commons. Angered by the conditions of the jail, Dunlop went on a hunger strike. When it proved effective, fourteen women imprisoned for smashing windows began to fast. WSPU members soon became known around the country for holding prolonged hunger strikes to protest their incarceration. Prison authorities frequently force-fed the women, using tubes inserted through the nose or mouth. The painful techniques (which, in the case of mouth-feeding, required the use of steel gags to force the mouth open) brought condemnation from suffragists and medical professionals.

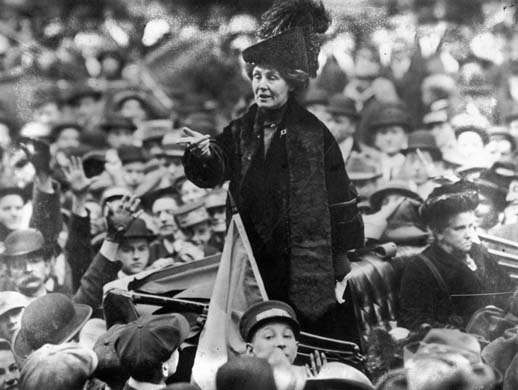
After selling her home, Pankhurst travelled constantly, giving speeches throughout Britain and the United States. One of her most famous speeches, "Freedom or death", was delivered in Connecticut in 1913

These tactics caused some tension between the WSPU and more moderate organisations, which had coalesced into the National Union of Women's Suffrage Societies (NUWSS). That group's leader, Millicent Fawcett, originally hailed WSPU members for their courage and dedication to the cause. By 1912, however, she declared that hunger strikes were mere publicity stunts and that militant activists were "the chief obstacles in the way of the success of the suffrage movement in the House of Commons." The NUWSS refused to join a march of women's suffrage groups after demanding without success that the WSPU end its support of property destruction. Fawcett's sister Elizabeth Garrett Anderson later resigned from the WSPU for similar reasons.

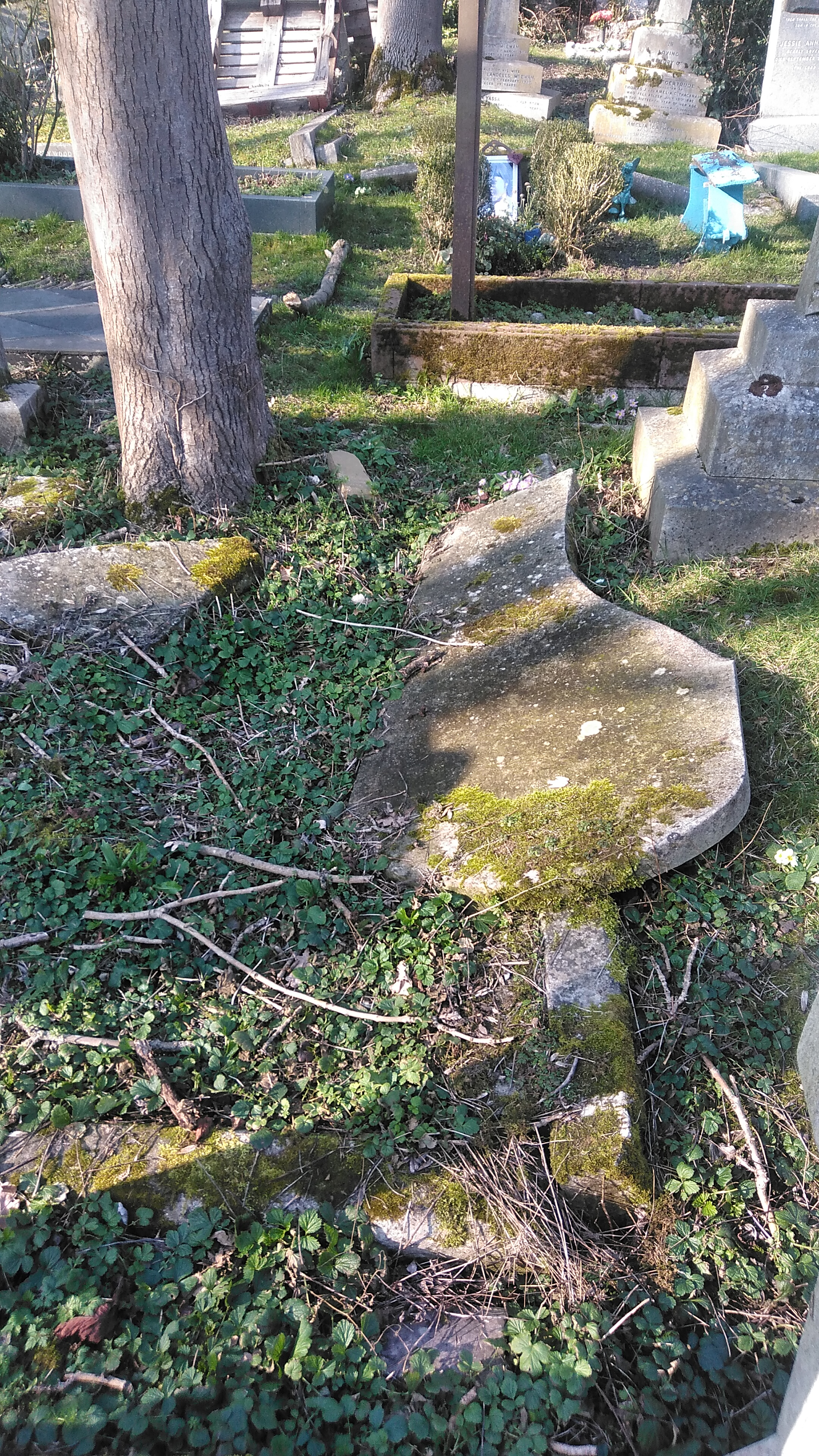
Grave of Emmeline Pankhurst's sons in Highgate Cemetery, London

Press coverage was mixed; many journalists noted that crowds of women responded positively to speeches by Pankhurst, while others condemned her radical approach to the issue. The Daily News urged her to endorse a more moderate approach, and other press outlets condemned the breaking of windows by WSPU members. In 1906 Daily Mail journalist Charles Hands referred to militant women using the diminutive term "suffragette" (rather than the standard "suffragist"). Pankhurst and her allies seized the term as their own and used it to differentiate themselves from moderate groups.

The last half of the century's first decade was a time of sorrow, loneliness, and constant work for Pankhurst. In 1907 she sold her home in Manchester and began an itinerant lifestyle, moving from place to place as she spoke and marched for women's suffrage. She stayed with friends and in hotels, carrying her few possessions in suitcases. Although she was energized by the struggle—and found joy in giving energy to others—her constant travelling meant separation from her children, especially Christabel, who had become the national coordinator of the WSPU. In 1909, as Pankhurst planned a speaking tour of the United States, Henry was paralysed after his spinal cord became inflamed. She hesitated to leave the country while he was ill, but she needed money to pay for his treatment and the tour promised to be lucrative. On her return from a successful tour, she sat by Henry's bedside as he died on 5 January 1910. Five days later she buried him beside his brother Frank in Highgate Cemetery, then spoke before 5,000 people in Manchester. Liberal Party supporters who had come to heckle her remained quiet as she addressed the crowd.

=== Conciliation, force-feeding attempt, and arson ===
After the Liberal losses in the 1910 elections, ILP member and journalist Henry Brailsford helped organise a Conciliation Committee for Women's Suffrage, which gathered 54 MPs from various parties. The group's Conciliation Bill looked to be a narrowly defined but still significant possibility to achieve the vote for some women. Thus, the WSPU agreed to suspend its support for window-breaking and hunger strikes while it was being negotiated. When it became clear that the bill would not pass, Pankhurst declared: "If the Bill, in spite of our efforts, is killed by the Government, then ... I have to say there is an end to the truce." When it was defeated, Pankhurst led a protest march of 300 women to Parliament Square on 18 November. They were met with aggressive police response, directed by Home Secretary Winston Churchill: officers punched the marchers, twisted arms, and pulled on women's breasts. Although Pankhurst was allowed to enter Parliament, Prime Minister Asquith refused to meet her. The incident became known as Black Friday. Her sister Mary Jane, who had attended the protest, too, was arrested for the third time, a few days later. She was sentenced to a month of imprisonment. On Christmas Day she died at the home of their brother Herbert Goulden, two days after her release.

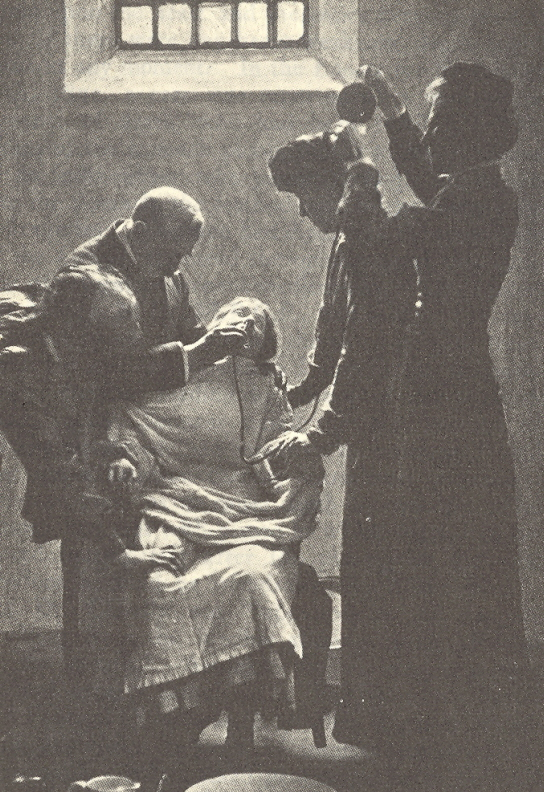
Pankhurst was horrified by the screams of women being force-fed during hunger strikes. In her autobiography, she wrote: "I shall never while I live forget the suffering I experienced during the days when those cries were ringing in my ears"

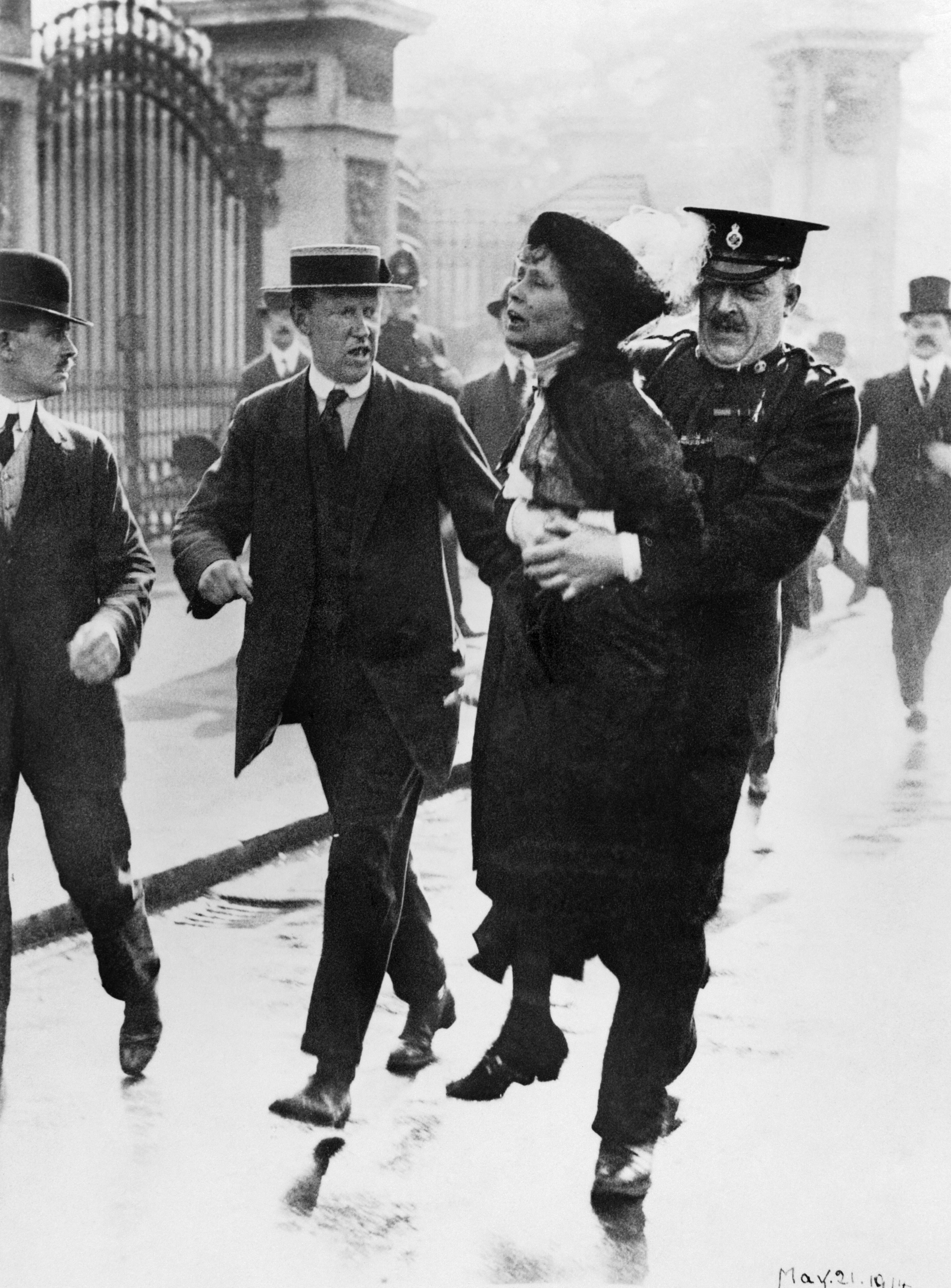
Pankhurst is arrested by police outside Buckingham Palace while trying to present a petition to George V in May 1914

As subsequent Conciliation Bills were introduced, WSPU leaders advocated a halt to militant tactics. Aileen Preston was appointed as Pankhurst's driver in April 1911, to drive her around the country to help spread the suffrage message.

In March 1912, the second bill was in jeopardy and Pankhurst joined a fresh outbreak of window-smashing. Extensive property damage led police to raid the WSPU offices. Pankhurst and Emmeline Pethick-Lawrence were tried at the Old Bailey and convicted of conspiracy to commit property damage. Christabel, who by 1912 was the chief coordinator for the organisation, was also wanted by police. She fled to Paris, where she directed WSPU strategy in exile. Inside Holloway Prison, Emmeline Pankhurst staged her first hunger strike to improve conditions for other suffragettes in nearby cells; she was quickly joined by Pethick-Lawrence and other WSPU members. She described in her autobiography the trauma caused by force-feeding during the strike: "Holloway became a place of horror and torment. Sickening scenes of violence took place almost every hour of the day, as the doctors went from cell to cell performing their hideous office." When prison officials tried to enter her cell, Pankhurst raised a clay jug over her head and announced: "If any of you dares so much as to take one step inside this cell I shall defend myself."

Pankhurst was spared further force-feeding attempts after this incident, but she continued to violate the law and – when imprisoned – starve herself in protest. During the following two years she was arrested numerous times but was frequently released after several days because of her ill health. Later, the Asquith government enacted the Cat and Mouse Act, which allowed similar releases for other suffragettes facing ill-health due to hunger strikes. Prison officials recognised the potential public relations disaster that would erupt if the popular WSPU leader were force-fed or allowed to suffer extensively in jail. Still, police officers arrested her during talks and as she marched. She tried to evade police harassment by wearing disguises and eventually the WSPU established a jujutsu-trained female bodyguard squad to physically protect her against the police. She and other escorts were targeted by police, resulting in violent scuffles as officers tried to detain Pankhurst.

In 1912, WSPU members adopted arson as another tactic to win the vote. After Prime Minister Asquith had visited the Theatre Royal in Dublin, suffragette activists Gladys Evans, Lizzie Baker, Mary Leigh, and Mabel Capper attempted to cause an explosion using gunpowder and benzine, which resulted in minimal damage. During the same evening, Mary Leigh threw an axe at the carriage containing John Redmond (leader of the Irish Parliamentary Party), the Lord Mayor, and Asquith.

Over the next two years women set fire to a refreshments building in Regent's Park, an orchid house at Kew Gardens, pillar boxes, and a railway carriage. Emily Davison threw herself under the King's horse Anmer at the Epsom Derby in 1913. Her funeral drew 55,000 attendees along the streets and at the funeral. This gave significant publicity to the movement. Although Pankhurst confirmed that these women had not been commanded by her or Christabel, they both assured the public that they supported the arsonist suffragettes. There were similar incidents around the country. One WSPU member, for example, put a small hatchet into the Prime Minister's carriage inscribed with the words: "Votes for Women," and other suffragettes used acid to burn the same slogan into golf courses used by MPs. In 1914, Mary Richardson slashed the Velasquez painting Rokeby Venus to protest against Pankhurst's imprisonment.

=== Defection and dismissal ===
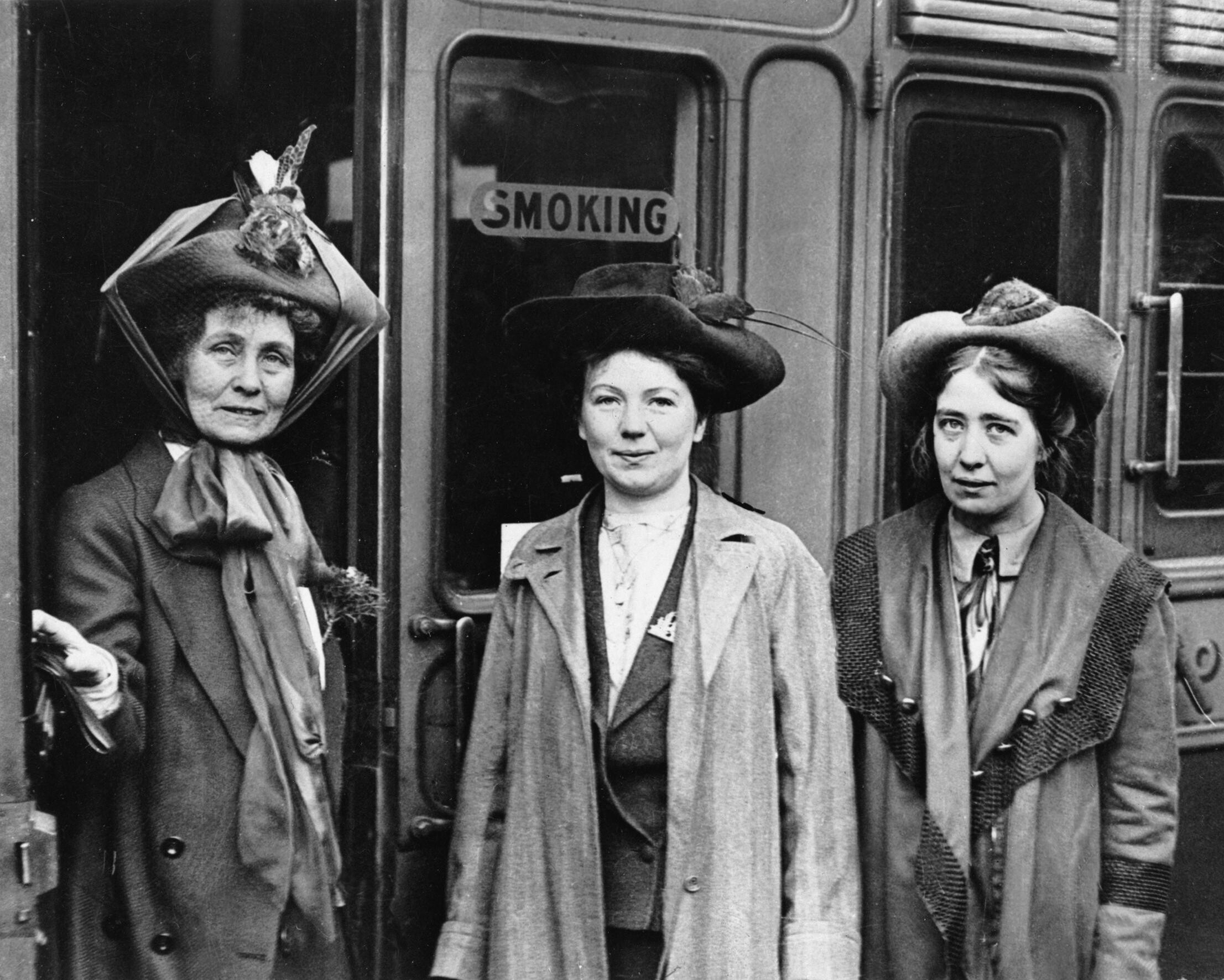
Emmeline Pankhurst (left) and Christabel (centre) and Sylvia at Waterloo Station, London on 4 October 1911.

The WSPU's approval of property destruction led to the departure of several important members. The first were Emmeline Pethick-Lawrence and her husband Frederick Pethick-Lawrence. They had long been integral members of the group's leadership but found themselves in conflict with Christabel about the wisdom of such volatile tactics. After returning from a vacation in Canada they found that Pankhurst had expelled them from the WSPU. The pair found the decision appalling, but to avoid a schism in the movement they continued to praise Pankhurst and the organisation in public. Around the same time, Emmeline's daughter Adela left the group. She disapproved of WSPU endorsement of property destruction and felt that a heavier emphasis on socialism was necessary. Adela's relationship with her family – especially Christabel – was also strained as a result.

The deepest rift in the Pankhurst family came in November 1913 when Sylvia spoke at a meeting of socialists and trade unionists in support of trade union organiser Jim Larkin. She had been working with the East London Federation of Suffragettes (ELFS), a local branch of the WSPU which had a close relationship with socialists and organised labour. The close connection to labour groups and Sylvia's appearance on stage with Frederick Pethick-Lawrence – who also addressed the crowd – convinced Christabel that her sister was organising a group that might challenge the WSPU in the suffrage movement. The dispute became public, and members of groups including the WSPU, ILP, and ELFS braced themselves for a showdown. After being dismissed from the WSPU, Sylvia felt "bruised, as one does, when fighting the foe without, one is struck by the friend within."

In January Sylvia was summoned to Paris, where Emmeline and Christabel were waiting. Their mother had just returned from another tour of the US, and Sylvia had just been released from prison. All three women were exhausted and stressed, which added considerably to the tension. In her 1931 book The Suffrage Movement Sylvia describes Christabel as an unreasonable figure, haranguing her for refusing to toe the WSPU line:

She turned to me. "You have your own ideas. We do not want that; we want all our women to take their instructions and walk in step like an army!" Too tired, too ill to argue, I made no reply. I was oppressed by a sense of tragedy, grieved by her ruthlessness. Her glorification of autocracy seemed to me remote indeed from the struggle we were waging, the grim fight even now proceeding in the cells. I thought of many others who had been thrust aside for some minor difference.

With their mother's blessing, Christabel ordered Sylvia's group to dissociate from the WSPU. Pankhurst tried to persuade the ELFS to remove the word "suffragettes" from its name, since it was inextricably linked to the WSPU. When Sylvia refused, her mother switched to fierce anger in a letter:

You are unreasonable, always have been & I fear always will be. I suppose you were made so! ... Had you chosen a name which we could approve we could have done much to launch you & advertise your society by name. Now you must take your own way of doing so. I am sorry but you make your own difficulties by an incapacity to look at situations from other people's point of view as well as your own. Perhaps in time you will learn the lessons that we all have to learn in life.

Adela, unemployed and unsure of her future, had become a worry for Pankhurst as well. She decided that Adela should move to Australia, and paid for her relocation. They never saw one another again.

=== The Women's Party ===
In November 1917 the WSPU's weekly newspaper announced that the WSPU was to become the Women's Party. Twelve months later on Tuesday 19 November at the Queen's Hall in London Emmeline Pankhurst said that her daughter Christabel would be their candidate at the forthcoming General Election, the first at which women could stand as candidates. They didn't say which constituency they would fight but a few days later Westbury in Wiltshire was identified. Emmeline lobbied Prime Minister David Lloyd George to ensure Christabel would have coalition backing. However, as these discussions were taking place the Pankhursts switched their attention to Smethwick in Staffordshire. The Coalition had already settled on a local candidate, Major Samuel Nock Thompson, but Bonar Law, the Conservative leader, was persuaded to ask Thompson to withdraw. Significantly, Christabel was not issued with a formal letter of support from the two leaders, the Coalition Coupon. Christabel then had a straight fight with the Labour candidate John Davison and lost by 775 votes. The Women's Party fought no other elections and closed soon after.

== First World War ==
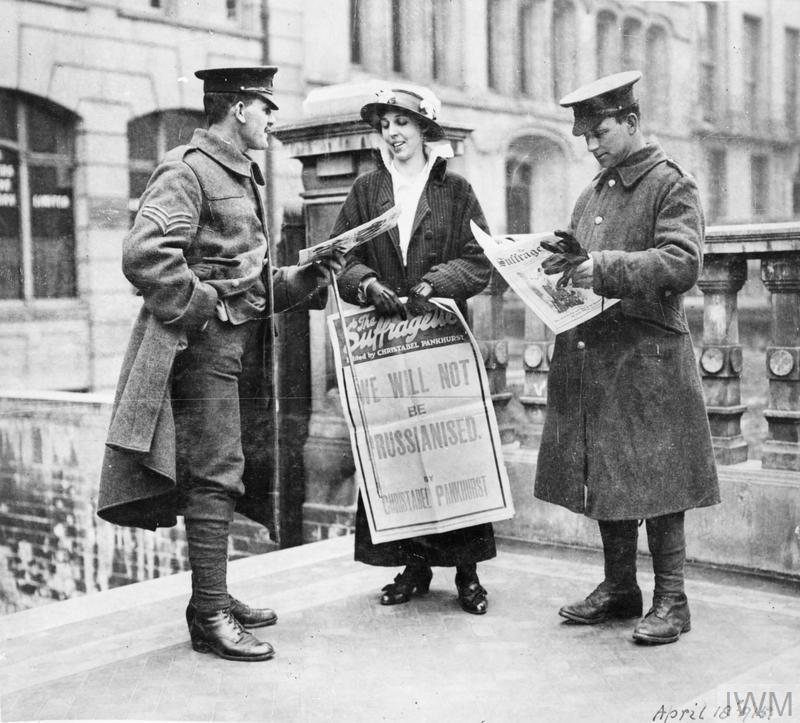
A female women's rights activist handing out the Suffragette newspaper with the headline "We Will Not Be Prussianised" to British servicemen on 16 April 1915

When the First World War began in August 1914, Emmeline and Christabel considered that the threat posed by Germany was a danger to all humanity, and that the British government needed the support of all men. They persuaded the WSPU to halt all militant suffrage activities until fighting on the European mainland ended. It was no time for dissent or agitation; Christabel wrote later: "This was national militancy. As Suffragists we could not be pacifists at any price." A truce with the government was established, all WSPU prisoners were released, and Christabel returned to London. Emmeline and Christabel set the WSPU into motion on behalf of the war effort. In her first speech after returning to Britain, Christabel warned of the "German Peril". She urged the gathered women to follow the example of their French sisters, who – while the men fought – "are able to keep the country going, to get in the harvest, to carry on the industries".

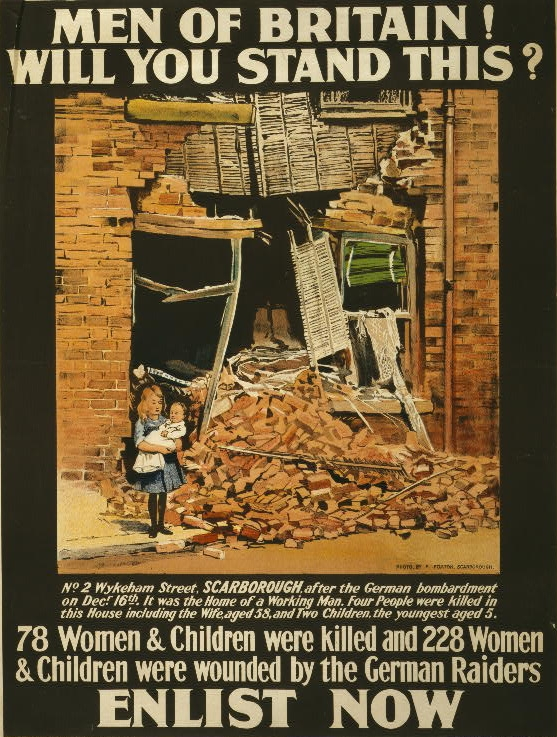
Pankhurst believed that the danger posed during the First World War by what she called the "German Peril" outweighed the need for women's suffrage. "[W]hen the time comes we shall renew that fight," she said, "but for the present we must all do our best to fight a common foe"

Sylvia and Adela, meanwhile, did not share their mother's enthusiasm for the war. As committed pacifists, they rejected the WSPU's support for the government. Sylvia's socialist perspective convinced her that the war was another example of capitalist oligarchs exploiting poor soldiers and workers. Adela, however, spoke against the war in Australia and made public her opposition to conscription. On 8 March 1917, Emmeline sent an angry telegram to the Australian Prime Minister, Billy Hughes, in which she condemned her daughter, saying that: "I am ashamed of Adela and repudiate her." In a short letter, Emmeline told Sylvia: "I am ashamed to know where you and Adela stand."

Pankhurst had a similar impatience for dissent within the WSPU; when long-time member Mary Leigh asked a question during a meeting in October 1915, Pankhurst replied: "That woman is a pro German and should leave the hall ... I denounce you as a pro German and wish to forget that such a person ever existed." Some WSPU members were outraged by this sudden rigid devotion to the government, the leadership's perceived abandonment of efforts to win the vote for women, and questions about how funds collected on behalf of suffrage were being managed with regard to the organisation's new focus. Two groups split from the WSPU: The Suffragettes of the Women's Social and Political Union (SWSPU) and the Independent Women's Social and Political Union (IWSPU), each dedicated to maintaining pressure toward women's suffrage.

Pankhurst put the same energy and determination she had previously applied to women's suffrage into patriotic advocacy of the war effort. She organised rallies, toured constantly delivering speeches, and lobbied the government to help women enter the work force while men were overseas fighting. One of Pankhurst's speeches was in St Andrew's Halls in Glasgow in November 1916. This meeting had been organised to welcome French women munition workers. Although the French delegation did not arrive, Pankhurst delivered a speech, highlighting French sacrifice in the war, and stating that the it had to go on to the bitter end. She also declared that the war could not be decided by neutrals who had done nothing in the war.

Another issue which concerned her greatly at the time was the plight of so-called war babies, children born to single mothers whose fathers were on the front lines. Pankhurst established an adoption home at Campden Hill designed to employ the Montessori method of childhood education. Some women criticised Pankhurst for offering relief to parents of children born out of wedlock, but she declared indignantly that the welfare of children–whose suffering she had seen firsthand as a Poor Law Guardian–was her only concern. Due to lack of funds, however, the home was soon turned over to Princess Alice. Pankhurst herself adopted four children, whom she renamed Kathleen King, Flora Mary Gordon (later Mary Hodgson), Joan Pembridge and Elizabeth Tudor. They lived in London, where–for the first time in many years–she had a permanent home, at Holland Park. Asked how, at the age of 57 and with no steady income, she could take on the burden of bringing up four more children, Pankhurst replied: "My dear, I wonder I didn't take forty." The historian, Brian Harrison, interviewed Mary Hodgson, about Pankhurst, in July 1976 as part of the Suffrage Interviews project, titled Oral evidence on the suffragette and suffragist movements: the Brian Harrison interviews. She talks about Pankhurst's approach to motherhood and education, their time in Bermuda and Canada, and Pankhurst's death and funeral.

=== Russian delegation ===
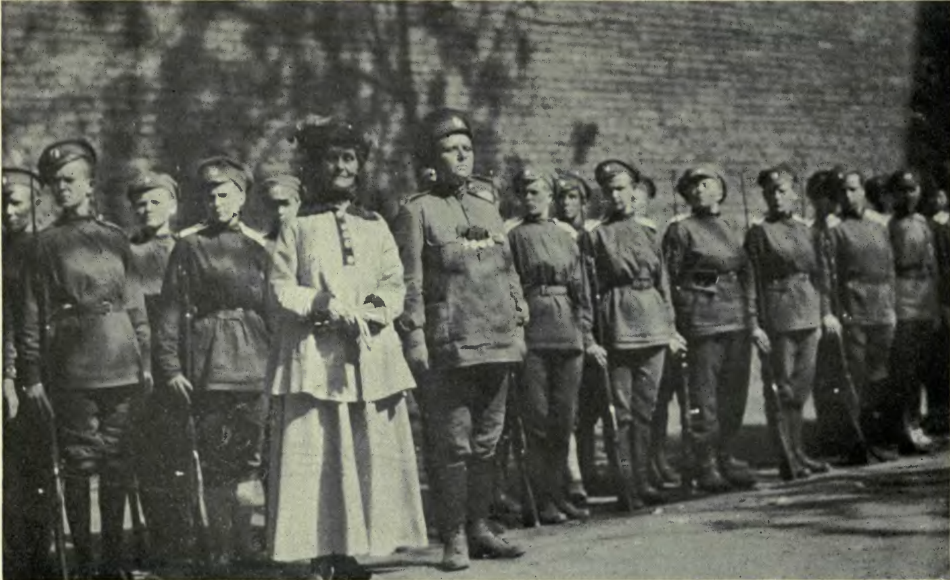
Maria Bochkareva and Pankhurst with women of the Women's Battalion of Death, 1917

Pankhurst visited North America in 1916 together with the former Secretary of State for Serbia, Čedomilj Mijatović, whose nation had been at the centre of fighting at the start of the war. They toured the United States and Canada, raising money and urging the US government to support Britain and its Canadian and other allies. Two years later, after the US entered the war, Pankhurst returned to the United States, encouraging suffragettes there – who had not suspended their militancy – to support the war effort by sidelining activities related to the vote. She also spoke about her fears of communist insurgency, which she considered a grave threat to Russian democracy.

By June 1917 the Russian Revolution had strengthened the Bolsheviks, who urged an end to the war. Pankhurst's translated autobiography had been read widely in Russia, and she saw an opportunity to put pressure on the Russian people. She hoped to convince them not to accept Germany's conditions for peace, which she saw as a potential defeat for Britain and Russia. UK Prime Minister David Lloyd George agreed to sponsor her trip to Russia, which she took in June. She told one crowd: "I came to Petrograd with a prayer from the English nation to the Russian nation, that you may continue the war on which depends the face of civilisation and freedom." Press response was divided between left and right wings; the former depicted her as a tool of capitalism, while the latter praised her devout patriotism.

In August she met with Alexander Kerensky, the Russian Prime Minister. Although she had been active with the socialist-leaning ILP in years past, Pankhurst had begun to see leftist politics as disagreeable, an attitude which intensified while she was in Russia. The meeting was uncomfortable for both parties; he felt that she was unable to appreciate the class-based conflict driving Russian policy at the time. He concluded by telling her that English women had nothing to teach women in Russia. She later told the New York Times that Kerensky was the "biggest fraud of modern times" and that his government could "destroy civilisation."

== Accomplishment of suffrage (1918) ==
When she returned from Russia, Pankhurst was delighted to find that women's right to vote was finally on its way to becoming a reality. The 1918 Representation of the People Act removed property restrictions on men's suffrage and granted the vote to women over the age of 30 (with several restrictions). As suffragists and suffragettes celebrated and prepared for its imminent passage, a new schism erupted: should women's political organisations join forces with those established by men? Many socialists and moderates supported unity of the sexes in politics, but Emmeline and Christabel Pankhurst saw the best hope in remaining separate. They reinvented the WSPU as the Women's Party, still open only to women. Women, they said, "can best serve the nation by keeping clear of men's party political machinery and traditions, which, by universal consent, leave so much to be desired." The party favoured equal marriage laws, equal pay for equal work, and equal job opportunities for women. These were matters for the post-war era, however. While the fighting continued the Women's Party demanded no compromise in the defeat of Germany; the removal from government of anyone with family ties to Germany or pacifist attitudes; and shorter work hours to forestall labour strikes. This last plank in the party's platform was meant to discourage potential interest in Bolshevism, about which Pankhurst was increasingly anxious.

== Post-war activities ==
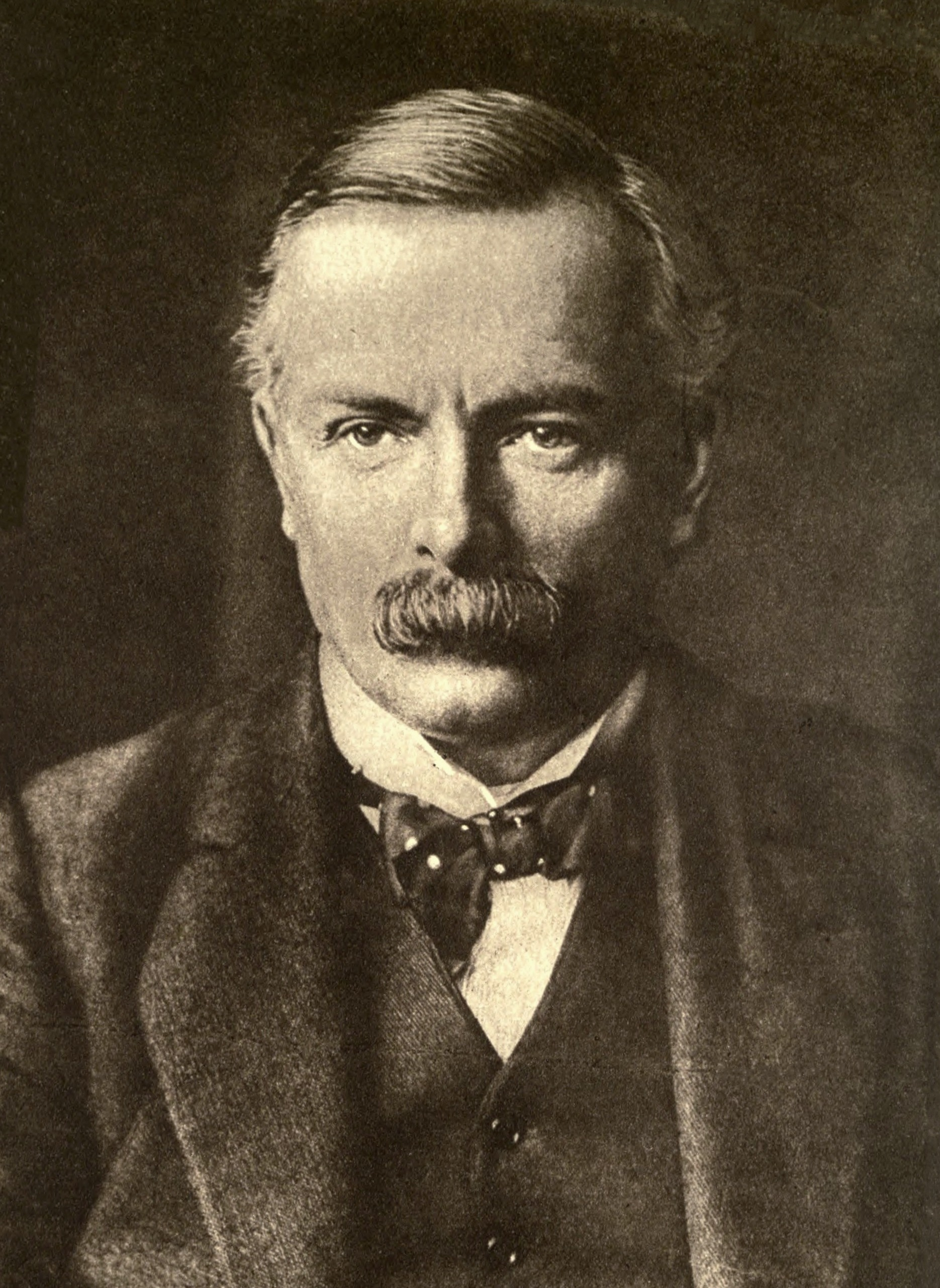
British Prime Minister David Lloyd George praised Pankhurst and the Women's Party: "They have fought the Bolshevist and Pacifist element with great skill, tenacity, and courage."

In the years after the 1918 Armistice, Pankhurst continued to promote her nationalist vision of British unity. She maintained a focus on women's empowerment, but her days of fighting with government officialdom were over. She defended the presence and reach of the British Empire: "Some talk about the Empire and Imperialism as if it were something to decry and something to be ashamed of. [I]t is a great thing to be the inheritors of an Empire like ours ... great in territory, great in potential wealth. ... If we can only realise and use that potential wealth we can destroy thereby poverty, we can remove and destroy ignorance." For years she travelled around England and North America, rallying support for the British Empire and warning audiences about the dangers of Bolshevism. After the war she lived in Bermuda and America for a couple of years.

Emmeline Pankhurst also became active in political campaigning again when a bill was passed allowing women to run for the House of Commons. Many Women's Party members urged Pankhurst to stand for election, but she insisted that Christabel was a better choice. She campaigned tirelessly for her daughter, lobbying Prime Minister Lloyd George for his support and at one point delivering a passionate speech in the rain. Christabel lost by a very slim margin to the Labour Party candidate, and the recount showed a difference of 775 votes. One biographer called it "the bitterest disappointment of Emmeline's life." The Women's Party withered from existence soon afterward.

As a result of her many trips to North America, Pankhurst became fond of Canada, stating in an interview that "there seems to be more equality between men and women [there] than in any other country I know." In 1922 she applied for Canadian "permission to land" (a prerequisite to status as a "British Subject with Canadian Domicile") and rented a house in Toronto, where she moved with her four adopted children. She became active with the Canadian National Council for Combating Venereal Diseases (CNCCVD), which worked against the sexual double standard which Pankhurst considered particularly harmful to women. In many of her public lectures across Canada, she also promoted eugenic feminist notions of "race betterment" and often gave speeches together with Emily Murphy, a prominent proponent of compulsory sterilisation for the "feeble-minded." During a tour of Bathurst, the mayor showed her a new building which would become the Home for Fallen Women. Pankhurst replied: "Ah! Where is your Home for Fallen Men?" Before long, however, she grew tired of long Canadian winters, and she ran out of money. She returned to England in late 1925.

Back in London Emmeline was visited by Sylvia, who had not seen her mother in years. Their politics were by now very different, and Sylvia was living, unmarried, with an Italian anarchist. Sylvia described a moment of familial affection when they met, followed by a sad distance between them. Emmeline's adopted daughter Mary, however, remembered the meeting differently. According to her version, Emmeline set her teacup down and walked silently out of the room, leaving Sylvia in tears. Christabel, meanwhile, had become a convert to Adventism and devoted much of her time to the church. The British press sometimes made light of the varied paths followed by the once indivisible family.

In 1926 Pankhurst joined the Conservative Party and two years later ran as a candidate for Parliament in Whitechapel and St George's. Her transformation from a fiery supporter of the ILP and window-smashing radical to an official Conservative Party member surprised many people. She replied succinctly: "My war experience and my experience on the other side of the Atlantic have changed my views considerably." Her biographers insist that the move was more complex; she was devoted to a programme of women's empowerment and anti-communism. Both the Liberal and Labour parties bore grudges for her work against them in the WSPU, and the Conservative Party had a victorious record after the war and a significant majority. Pankhurst may have joined the Conservative Party as much to secure the vote for women as from ideological affinity.

== Illness and death ==
Pankhurst's campaign for Parliament was pre-empted by her ill health and a final scandal involving Sylvia. The years of touring, lectures, imprisonment and hunger strikes had taken their toll; fatigue and illness became a regular part of Pankhurst's life. Even more painful, however, was the news in April 1928 that Sylvia had given birth out of wedlock. She had named the child Richard Keir Pethick Pankhurst, in memory of her father, her ILP comrade, and her colleagues from the WSPU respectively. Emmeline was further shocked to see a report from a newspaper in the US that declared that "Miss Pankhurst" – a title usually reserved for Christabel – boasted of her child being a triumph of "eugenics", since both parents were healthy and intelligent. In the article, Sylvia also spoke of her belief that "marriage without legal union" was the most sensible option for liberated women. These offences against the social dignity which Pankhurst had always valued devastated the elderly woman; to make matters worse, many people believed the "Miss Pankhurst" in newspaper headlines referred to Christabel. After hearing the news, Emmeline spent an entire day crying; her campaign for Parliament ended with the scandal.

As her health deteriorated, Pankhurst moved into a nursing home in Hampstead. She requested that she be treated by the doctor who attended to her during her hunger strikes. His use of the stomach pump had helped her feel better while in prison; her nurses were sure that the shock of such treatment would severely wound her, but Christabel felt obliged to carry out her mother's request. Before the procedure could be carried out, however, she fell into a critical condition from which none expected her to recover. On Thursday, 14 June 1928, Pankhurst died at the age of 69.

She was interred in Brompton Cemetery in London. Her pallbearers were the former WSPU suffragettes Georgina Brackenbury, Marie Brackenbury, Marion Wallace Dunlop, Harriet Kerr, Mildred Mansel, Kitty Marshall, Marie Naylor, Ada Wright and Barbara Wylie.

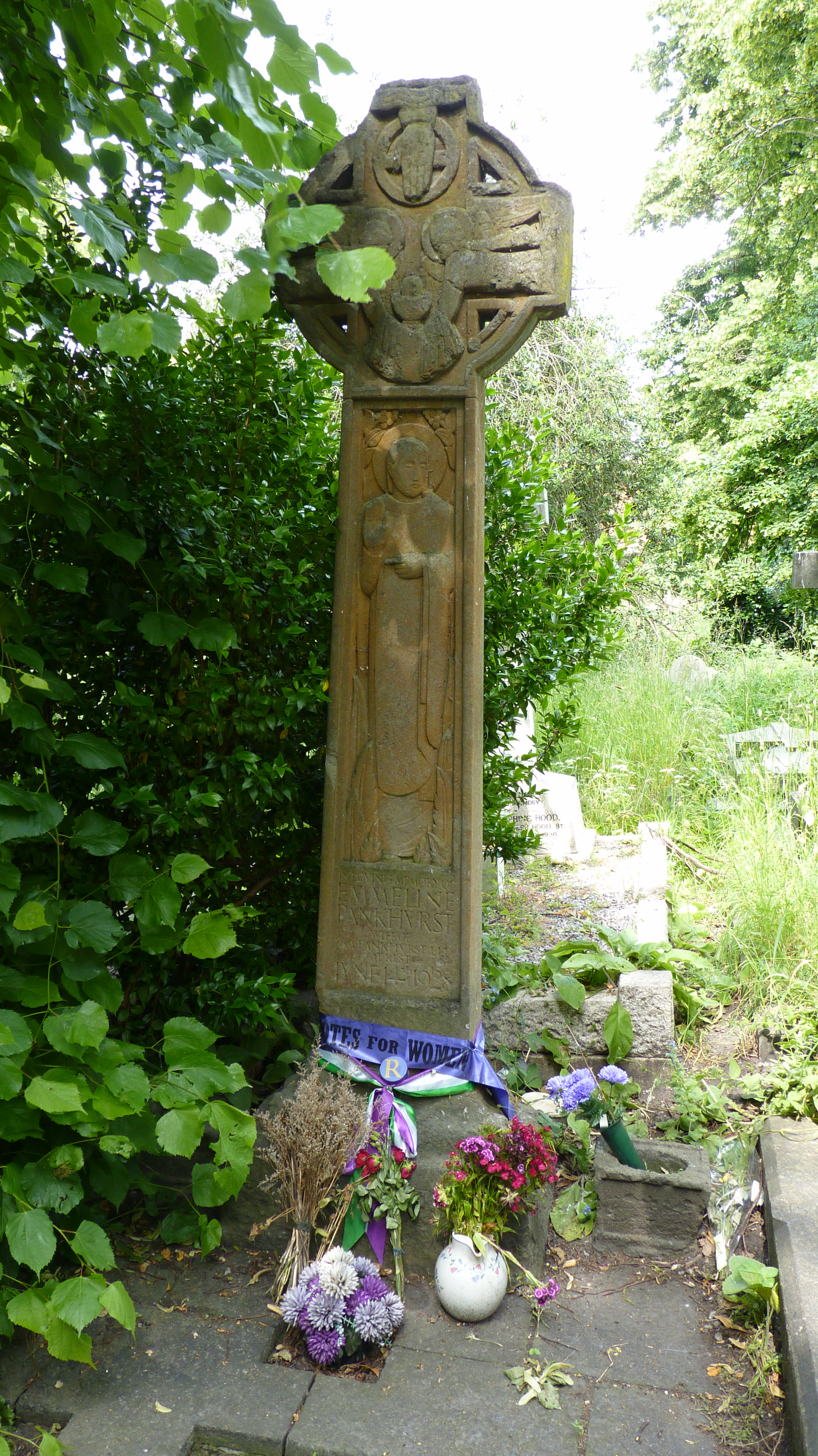
Pankhurst's grave in Brompton Cemetery. The gravestone was sculpted by Julian Phelps Allan

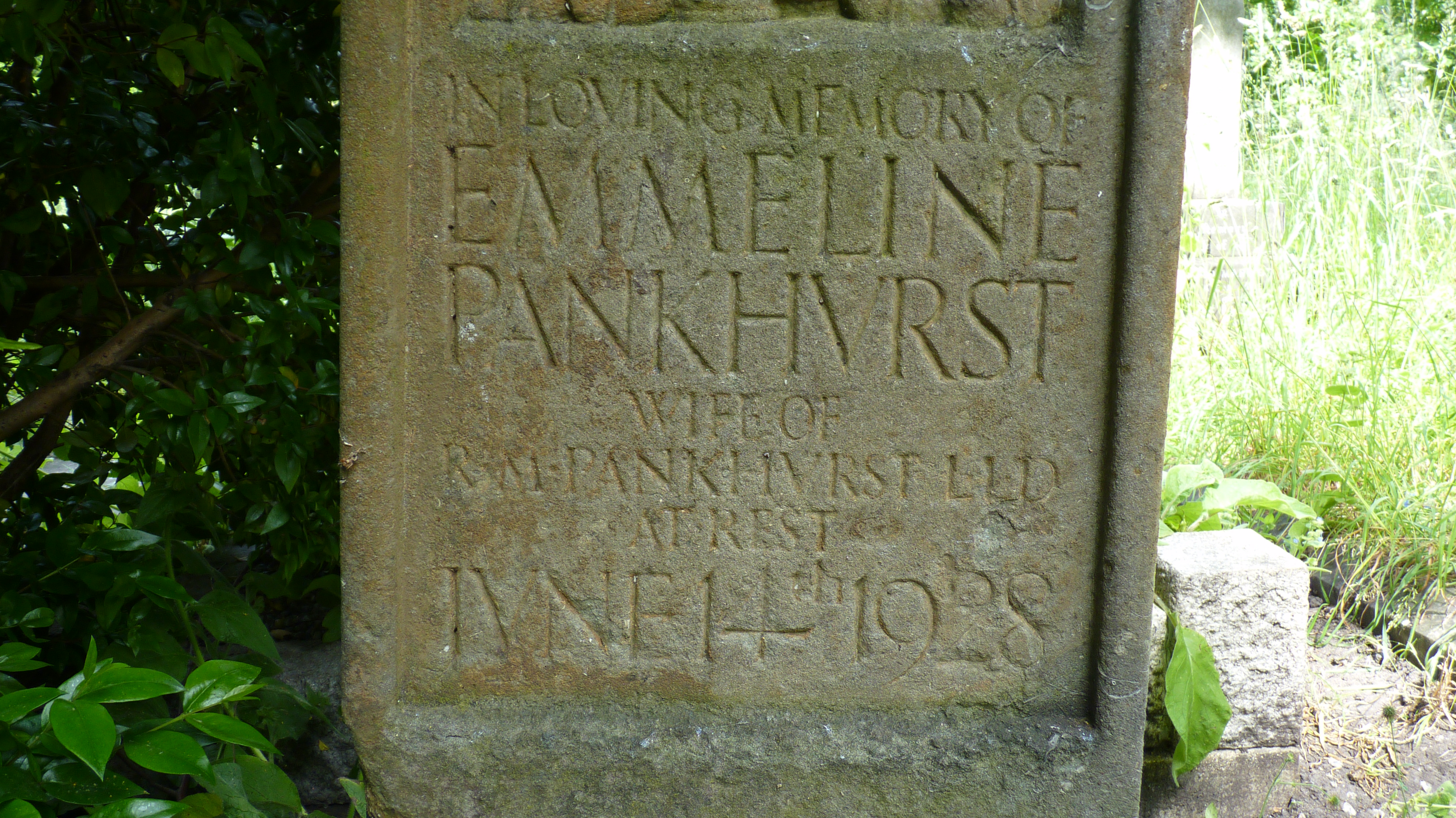
Gravestone inscription:
IN LOVING MEMORY OF EMMELINE PANKHURST, WIFE OF R M PANKHURST LLD, AT REST 14 June 1928

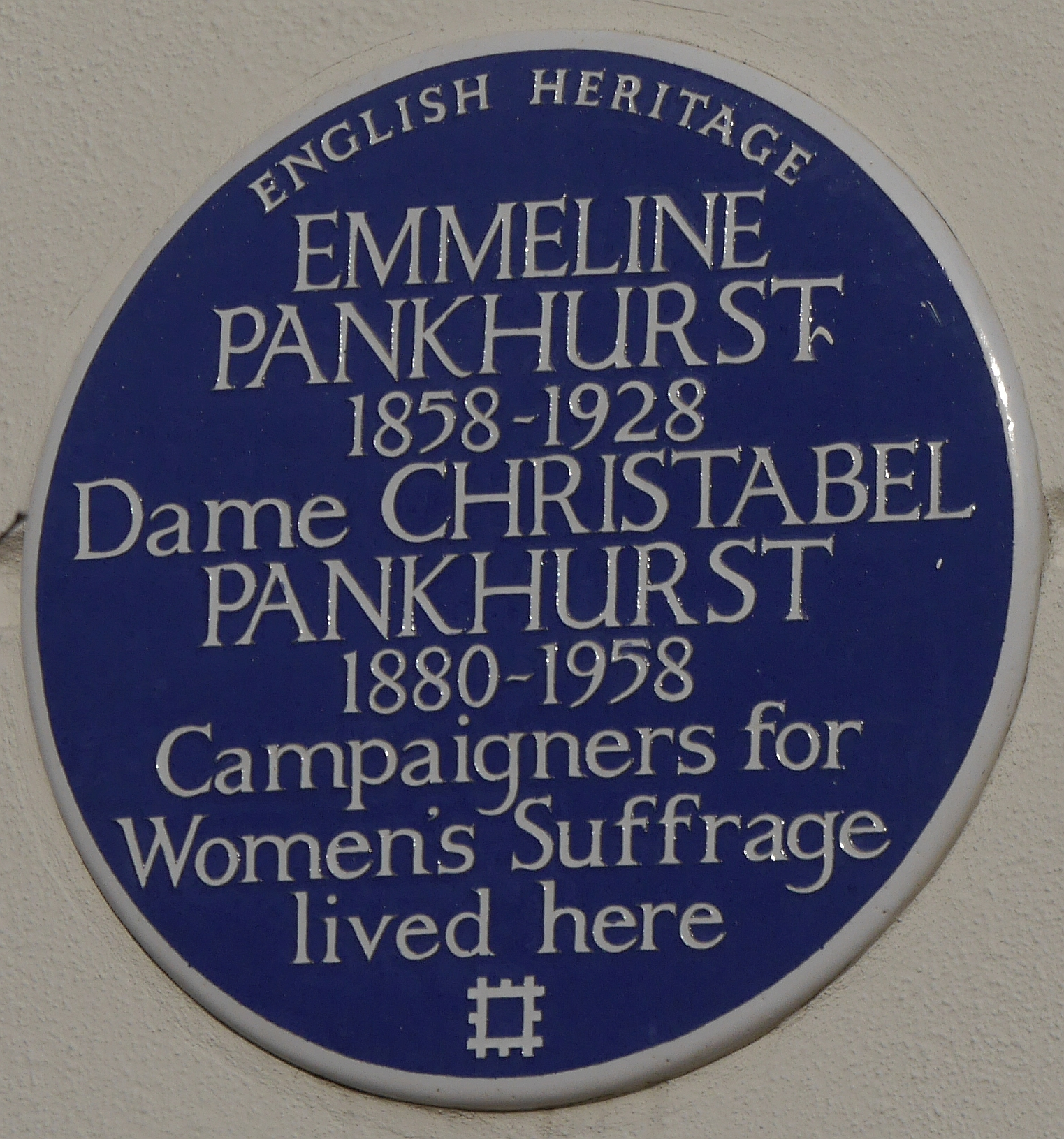
Blue plaque, 50 Clarendon Road, London

== Legacy ==
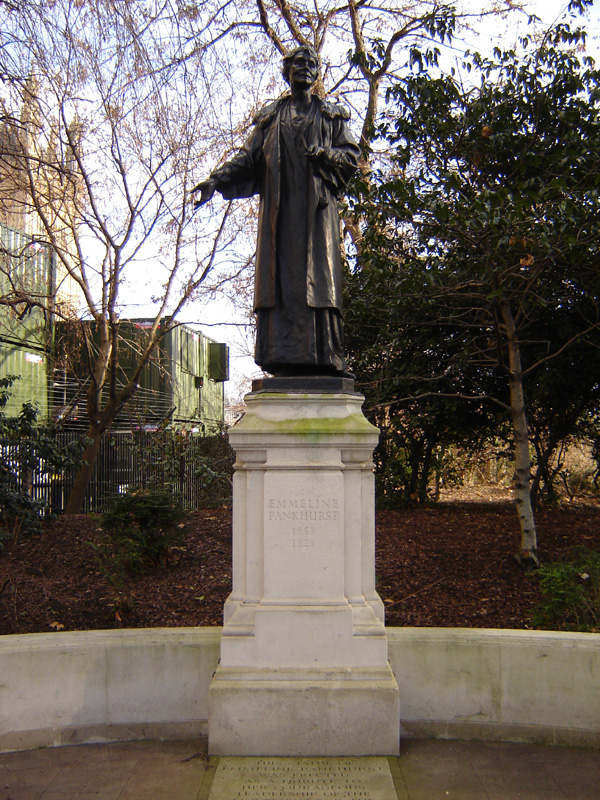
Emmeline Pankhurst's memorial statue (1930), by Arthur George Walker, was erected with unusual speed, as noted by The New York Times: "While the transition from martyrdom to sculptured memorials is familiar, the process in Mrs Pankhurst's case has been unusually brief."

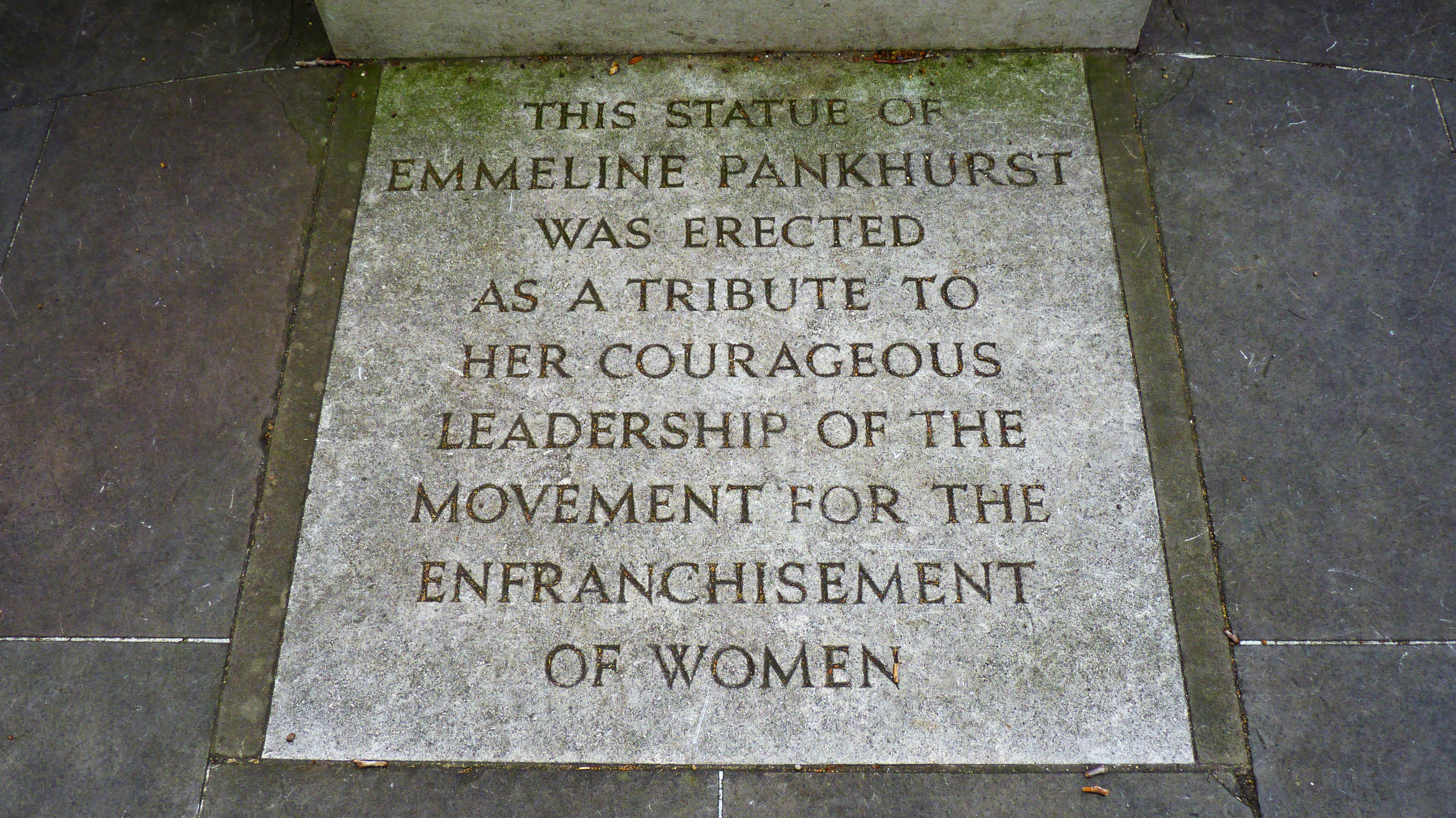
Inscription at the statue's base: THIS STATUE OF EMMELINE PANKHURST WAS ERECTED AS A TRIBUTE TO HER COURAGEOUS LEADERSHIP OF THE MOVEMENT FOR THE ENFRANCHISEMENT OF WOMEN

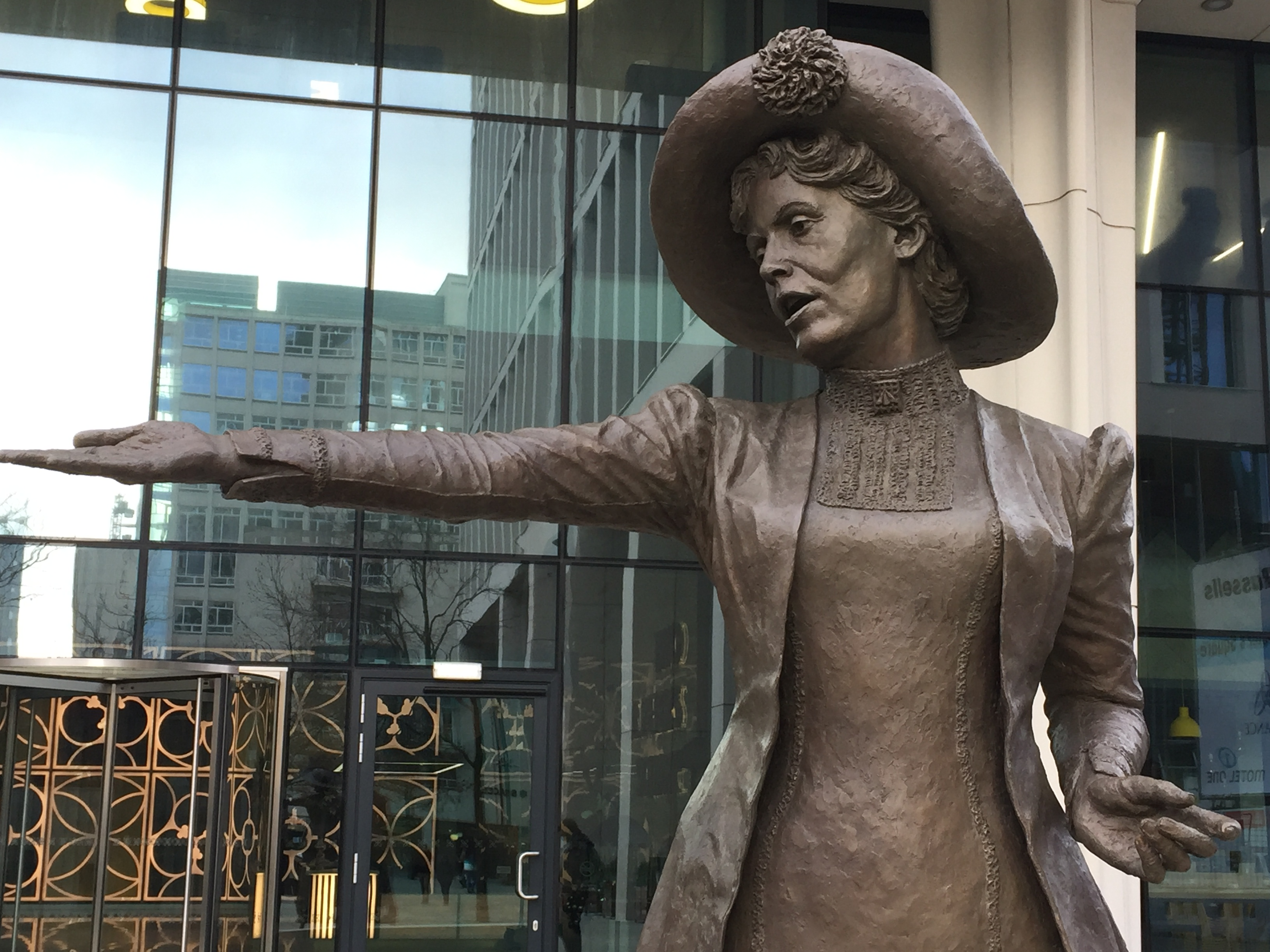
Rise up, Women, a statue of Pankhurst in St Peter's Square in Manchester, her home town.

News of Emmeline Pankhurst's death was announced around the country, and extensively in North America. Her funeral service on 18 June 1928 was filled with her former WSPU colleagues and those who had worked beside her in various capacities. The Daily Mail described the procession as "like a dead general in the midst of a mourning army". Women wore WSPU sashes and ribbons, and the organisation's flag was carried alongside the Union Flag. Christabel and Sylvia appeared together at the service, the latter with her child. Adela did not attend. Press coverage around the world recognised her tireless work on behalf of women's right to vote – even if they did not agree on the value of her contributions. The New York Herald Tribune called her "the most remarkable political and social agitator of the early part of the twentieth century and the supreme protagonist of the campaign for the electoral enfranchisement of women."

Shortly after the funeral, one of Pankhurst's bodyguards from her WSPU days, Catherine Marshall, began raising funds for a memorial statue. In spring 1930 her efforts bore fruit, and on 6 March her statue in Victoria Tower Gardens, next to and gesturing towards the Houses of Parliament, was unveiled. A crowd of radicals, former suffragettes, and national dignitaries gathered as former Prime Minister Stanley Baldwin presented the memorial to the public. In his address, Baldwin declared: "I say with no fear of contradiction, that whatever view posterity may take, Mrs. Pankhurst has won for herself a niche in the Temple of Fame which will last for all time." Sylvia was the only Pankhurst daughter in attendance; Christabel, touring North America, sent a telegram which was read aloud. While planning the agenda for the day, Marshall had intentionally excluded Sylvia, who in her opinion had hastened Pankhurst's death. Historic England listed the statue as Grade II on 5 February 1970.

A proposal to move the statue of Pankhurst away from the Houses of Parliament to the private Regent's University London in Regent's Park was submitted to Westminster City Council planning department in July 2018 by former Conservative MP Sir Neil Thorne. This proposal was withdrawn in September 2018 after widespread anger and a public campaign against it. The planning application received 896 comments, 887 of them objections. A 38 Degrees petition against the removal of the statue attracted 180,839 signatures. The Curator's Office at the Palace of Westminster commissioned a report into the plan to remove the statue. Published on 22 August 2018, it concluded 'The Memorial to Emmeline and Christabel Pankhurst is of high significance, which is not fully recognised through its listing at Grade II. An application has been made to Historic England to upgrade the memorial to Grade II*. This is based on it having 'more than special interest', in terms of its unique history, its artistic quality and the importance of its setting next to the Houses of Parliament. This proposal to move the memorial from Victoria Tower Gardens to Regent's Park would cause substantial harm to the significance of the memorial, as well has harm to the Westminster Abbey and Parliament Square Conservation Area...The proposal to move the memorial, therefore, should not be granted planning permission or listed building consent.

During the twentieth century Emmeline Pankhurst's value to the movement for women's suffrage was debated passionately, and no consensus was achieved. Her daughters Sylvia and Christabel weighed in with books, scornful and laudatory respectively, about their time in the struggle. Sylvia's 1931 book The Suffrage Movement describes her mother's political shift at the start of the First World War as the beginning of a betrayal of her family (especially her father) and the movement. It set the tone for much of the socialist and activist history written about the WSPU and particularly solidified Emmeline Pankhurst's reputation as an unreasonable autocrat. Christabel's "Unshackled: The Story of How We Won the Vote," released in 1959, paints her mother as generous and selfless to a fault, offering herself completely to the most noble causes. It provided a sympathetic counterpart to Sylvia's attacks and continued the polarised discussion; detached and objective assessment has rarely been a part of Pankhurst scholarship.

Recent biographies show that historians differ about whether Emmeline Pankhurst's militancy helped or hurt the movement; however, there is general agreement that the WSPU raised public awareness of the movement in ways that proved essential. Baldwin compared her to Martin Luther and Jean-Jacques Rousseau: individuals who were not the sum total of the movements in which they took part, but who nevertheless played crucial roles in struggles of social and political reform. In the case of Pankhurst, this reform took place in both intentional and unintentional ways. By defying the roles of wife and mother as the docile companion, Pankhurst helped to pave the way for many future feminists, though some would later decry her support for empire and endorsement of the idea of "race betterment."

In 1987 one of her homes in Manchester was opened as the Pankhurst Centre, an all-women gathering space and museum. In 2002, Pankhurst was placed at number 27 in the BBC's poll of the 100 Greatest Britons. In 2006, a blue plaque for Pankhurst and her daughter, Christabel was placed by English Heritage at 50 Clarendon Road, Notting Hill, London W11 3AD, Royal Borough of Kensington and Chelsea, where they had lived.

In January 2016, following a public vote, it was announced that Rise up, Women, a statue of Emmeline Pankhurst by Hazel Reeves, would be unveiled in Manchester in 2019, making her the first woman to be honoured with a statue in the city since Queen Victoria more than 100 years ago. The statue was unveiled on 14 December 2018, one hundred years after British women were first able to vote in the 1918 United Kingdom general election. Her name and image and those of 58 other women's suffrage supporters including her daughters are etched on the plinth of the statue of Millicent Fawcett in Parliament Square, London that was unveiled in 2018. One of the "houses" at Wellacre Academy in Manchester is named after her.

Helen Pankhurst, the great-granddaughter of Emmeline Pankhurst and the granddaughter of Sylvia Pankhurst, works for women's rights. Along with her daughter, she founded Olympic Suffragettes, which campaigns on a number of women's rights issues.

Pankhurst has appeared in several works of popular culture. In the 1974 BBC television miniseries Shoulder to Shoulder, Pankhurst is played by Siân Phillips. In the 2015 film Suffragette, Pankhurst is played by Meryl Streep. Pankhurst is commemorated in the song "Emily" in the Manic Street Preachers album Lifeblood (2004).

== Works ==
- Pankhurst, Emmeline (1907). "The Present Position of the Women's Suffrage Movement" . The Case for Women's Suffrage: 42–49. Wikidata Q107130938 – via Wikisource.

== See also ==
- History of feminism
- List of civil rights leaders
- List of suffragists and suffragettes
- List of women's rights activists
- Suffragette bombing and arson campaign
- Timeline of women's suffrage
- White Feather Campaign
- Women's suffrage organisations
