= Women's Party (UK) =

Political party

- Founders: Christabel Pankhurst; Emmeline Pankhurst
- Founded: 1917
- Dissolved: June 1919
- Ideology: Feminism Interventionism Unionism

The Women's Party was a minor political party in the United Kingdom. It was founded by Christabel and Emmeline Pankhurst when they dissolved the Women's Social and Political Union in November 1917. The party ran on the slogan ‘Victory, National Security and Progress’, in an effort to conflate winning of the war with the women's cause.

== Policies ==
The party proclaimed the need for more stringent measures in support of Britain in World War I. Indeed, it gave out white feathers to all conscientious objectors. It changed the name of its paper from The Suffragette to Britannia, a paper which concentrated on enlisting women for the war effort. It claimed that this was far more important than the fight for women's suffrage, although it also had policies on equality for women and the abolition of trade unions.

The Party campaigned for Naturalisation Laws to be changed to prevent Germans and their allies gaining British nationality and exploiting it after the war.

The Party was firmly Unionist and supported strengthening the British Empire by bringing its natural resources and transport systems under British control.

The Party advocated a number of feminist policies, including: equal pay for equal work, equal marriage and divorce laws, equality of parental rights and raising the age of consent. The Party campaigned for maternity and infant care, which would be subsidized by parents according to their income.

Speaking in 1918, Christabel asserted that the Women's Party stands 'first for the defence of our frontiers, and then reforms inside our frontiers, to make life worth living and fighting for'.

== Reception ==
The Women's Party was launched at a time of growing domestic support for the Labour Party and the international rise of Bolshevism in Russia. With this in mind, its anti-Bolshevik stance attracted the approval of the British Government along with industrialists, such as Lord Leverhulme.

At the 1918 general election, following the passing of the Parliament (Qualification of Women) Act 1918, the party stood Christabel as a candidate in the Smethwick constituency in Staffordshire. She won 47.8% of the vote, losing by only 778 votes to her only opponent, the Labour Party's John Davison.

In 1919, Christabel was chosen as the Coalition's Prospective Parliamentary Candidate for Westminster Abbey, but in the event no by-election was held until 1921, when the Conservative Party chose their own candidate to represent the Coalition. The Women's Party wound itself up in June 1919.
