= Sophia Goulden =

Person

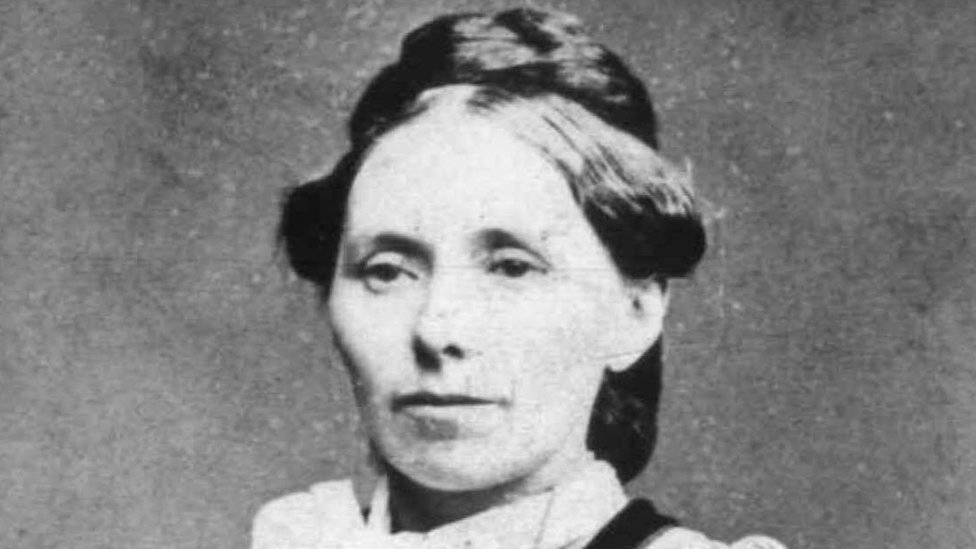
- Goulden c. 1890
- Born: Sophia Jane Craine; 1833; Lonan, Isle of Man
- Died: 22 April 1910 (aged 76–77); Douglas, Isle of Man
- Spouse: Robert Goulden (m. 1853; died 1892)
- Children: 11, including Emmeline Pankhurst and Mary Jane Clarke

Sophia Jane Goulden (née Craine; 1833 – 22 April 1910) was a Manx woman known for being the mother of suffragettes Emmeline Pankhurst and Mary Jane Clarke and she is credited with having an important forming influence on both her daughters’ political beliefs.

== Early life ==
Sophia Jane Craine was born in Lonan, Isle of Man, in 1833, to William Craine and Jane (née Quine). She was baptised 3 November 1833. Although William was a shoemaker by trade, he and his wife came to manage boarding houses in Douglas, initially Tynwald House at 3 North Quay, and then at Christian Road. In her youth Sophia was described as being ‘an unusually good-looking young lady’ and it is likely that she met Robert Goulden through the boarding house, whether he visited it on business or on holiday. Six years her elder, Robert Goulden was at that time an errand boy at a Manchester manufacturers. Sophia and Robert were married on 8 September 1853 at Kirk Braddan, when Sophia was 18 and Robert 24.

The newly married couple moved to Manchester, where Robert Goulden rose to become managing director of his own manufacturing business. Although the family would visit the Isle of Man regularly through her life, it was in Manchester that Sophia had her eleven children, ten of whom survived into adulthood: Walter, Emmeline, Edmund, Mary, Herbert, Effie, Robert, Ada Sophia, Alfred Harold and Eva Gertrude.

== Political engagement ==
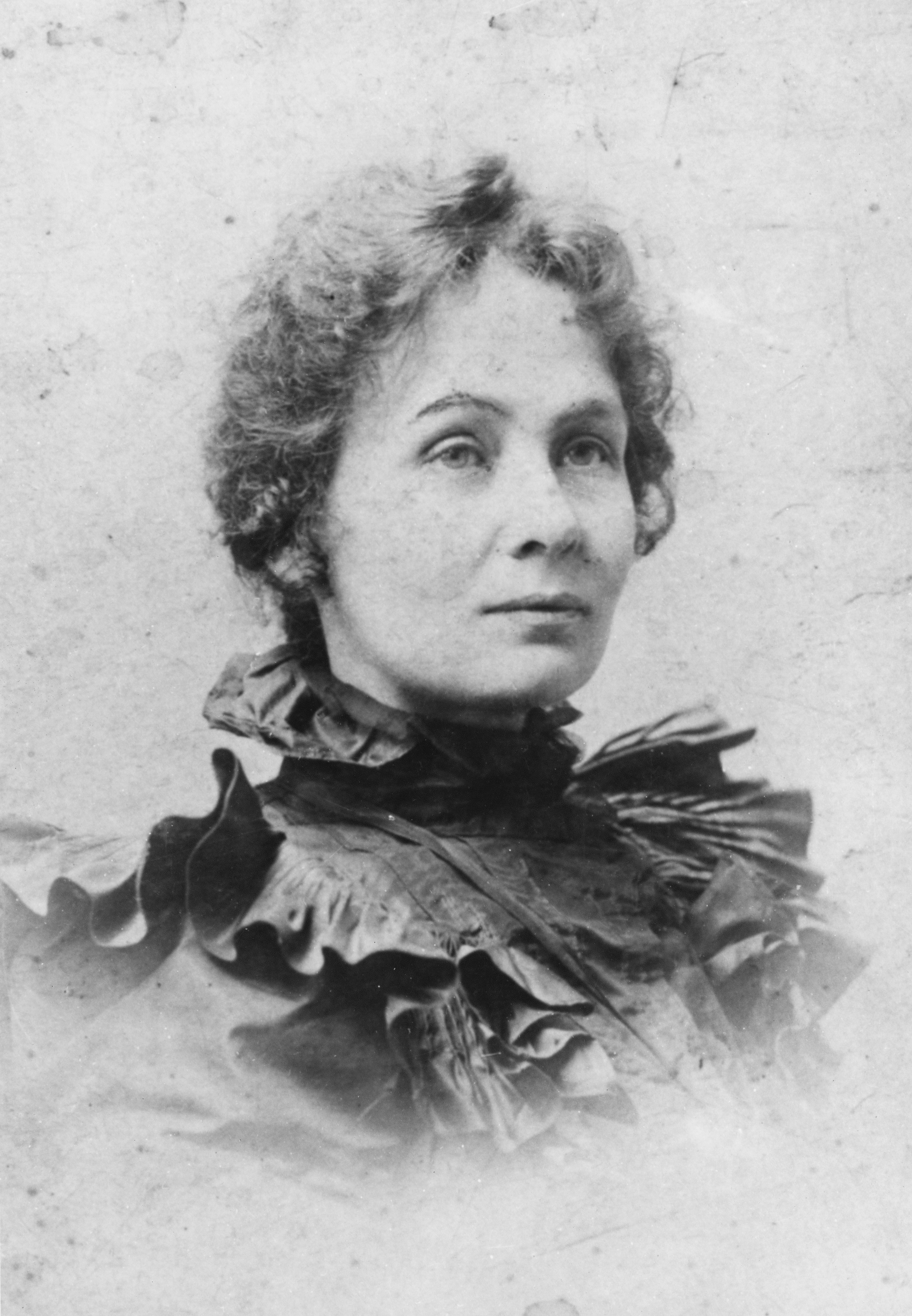
Sophia Goulden's daughter, Emmeline Pankhurst (née Goulden)

Later in her life, Emmeline was to write of her parents:

‘Those men and women are fortunate who are born at a time when a great struggle for human freedom is in progress. It is an added good fortune to have parents who take a personal part in the great movements of their time. I am glad and thankful that this was my case.’

Described as having ‘a bright and attractive personality,’ Sophia and her husband established themselves as members of Manchester's ‘radical elite,’ exposing their family to radical politics and bringing them into contact with ‘the foremost intellectuals of the time.’ It was amidst this ‘atmosphere of reformist zeal’ in the Goulden household that Sophia took her eldest daughter, Emmeline, to her first suffrage meeting in around 1872. Then aged 14, Emmeline left the meeting ‘a confirmed suffragist.’ The speaker they saw that day was Lydia Becker, who was to play an important role in the Isle of Man's becoming the first country in the world to grant votes to women in 1881. When her children were to go on their important roles in the suffragette movement, it was reported that Sophia ‘naturally approved and was entirely in sympathy with them in the matter, and was greatly enthusiastic to secure the [UK] vote for women.’

== Later life ==
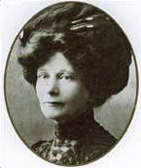
Her daughter Mary Jane Clarke died after force feeding

Sophia kept up the connection with the Isle of Man, generally visiting the Island for their summer holidays each year throughout her life. By this time Sophia's mother had moved to 9 Strathallan Crescent, Douglas, which was then bought by Robert Goulden in 1878. It was also here at Strathallan Crescent that Robert died on 24 April 1892, leaving Sophia to live on at the property with just her son, Walter, whose health was poor. Emmeline, Mary, Christabel and others of her family continued to visit her on the Isle of Man, until her death in 1910 at the age of 75. Having been in poor health for some months, she had ‘an attack of double pneumonia’ which led to her death at 5 o’clock on 22 April 1910 at her home.

Goulden was buried at Braddan New Cemetery, beside her husband. She left an estate worth £789 15s 1d and a will which stated that ‘the share which any female shall take under this my will shall be for her sole and separate use independently of any husband and of his debts.’ Sophia did not live to see her daughter Mary become the first suffragette to die for the cause later that year. She never saw the success of the Suffragette movement and the enfranchisement of women in the UK, although she had had the vote as a widowed property owner, for nearly thirty years in the Isle of Man.

== Legacy ==
In 1981 Sophia Goulden, along with her daughter, Emmeline, was commemorated with a stamp issued by the Isle of Man Post Office celebrating the enfranchisement of women on the Isle of Man in 1881.

In 2016, the Friends of Sophia Goulden was established in order to 'bring Sophia's role in the history of women's suffrage to greater public attention and to raise funds to create a suitable commemorative monument to her on the island.'

In September 2018, a blue plaque in her honour was unveiled at her former home on Strathallan Crescent in Douglas on the Isle of Man where she lived at the end on her life. She was only the fourth person born on the Isle of Man to receive the honour. Her great-great-granddaughter, Helen Pankhurst said: "Sophia's role as a campaigner in the movement, and as mother guiding the interest of her more famous daughter, have so far received insufficient recognition. The plaque can start to change this. Moreover, it's fitting that this plaque will be put up on the Isle of Man, where Sophia came from and returned to, but also the nation that led the way in giving women the right to vote."
