= Mary Jane Clarke =

British suffragette

- Born: Mary Jane Goulden; 1862; Salford, Manchester, England
- Died: 1910 (aged 47–48); London, England
- Occupation: Suffragette
- Known for: First suffragette to die for the cause
- Spouse: John Clarke (m. 1895–1904)
- Mother: Sophia Goulden
- Relatives: Emmeline Pankhurst (sister)

Mary Jane Clarke (née Goulden; 1862–1910) was a British suffragette. She died on Christmas Day 1910, two days after being released from prison, where she had been force-fed. She was described in her obituary by Emmeline Pethick-Lawrence as the suffragettes' first martyr. She was the younger sister of suffragette Emmeline Pankhurst.

== Biography ==
Clarke was born in Salford and was one of ten children, including older sister Emmeline, of Robert Goulden and Sophia (née Craine). Robert was a self-made man, managing director of a cotton-printing works, having worked his way up from being an errand boy at the time of his marriage; Sophia, a teacher, was an important influence on her daughters' political views. The Gouldens were a humble Manchester family with its own background of political activity; Robert's mother, a fustian cutter, worked with the Anti-Corn Law League, and his father was press-ganged into the Royal Navy and present at the Peterloo massacre, when cavalry charged and broke up a crowd demanding parliamentary reform.

She was educated at the École Normale (Sainte-Marie de Neuilly), avenue de Neuilly, in Paris, along with her sister. She was co-founder with Emmeline of the Emerson & Co. shop in Hampstead Row. At the shop, her artistic skills added decoration of the shop's stock of art-enamelled fancy goods and was described in the 1891 census as a "decorative artist". After the Pankhursts moved to Manchester in 1893, she helped to reliance Emerson's there in 1898. In December 1895, she married John Clarke. By 1904, she had left him and was living with her niece, Sylvia.

Clarke was employed as Emmeline Pankhurst's deputy as registrar in Manchester while she was also supporting the work of the Women's Social and Political Union. By February 1906, she was working only for the WSPU and in 1907 was appointed a WSPU organiser. In 1909, she led a group, including Irene Dallas, to Downing Street where she was arrested and sentenced to one month in prison.

Clarke was given a Hunger Strike Medal "for Valour".

After being released, Clarke began speaking for the WSPU in Yorkshire in 1909 and by the summer she was the organizer supported by Minnie Baldock who was financially supported by Minnie Turner to help Clarke on the south coast in Brighton. Clarke was calm and self-controlled when heckled, running the WSPU's election campaign for the January 1910 United Kingdom general election.

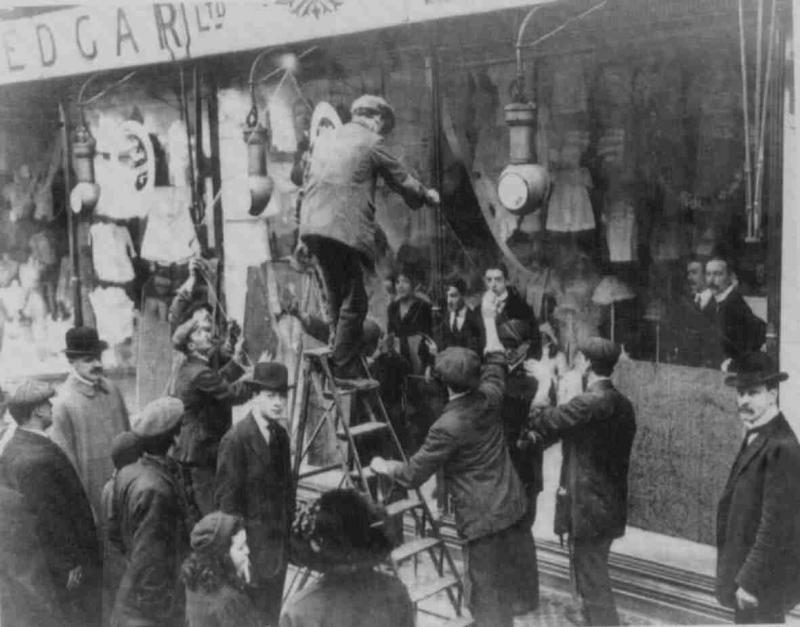
Window smashing campaign 1910

Clarke was admired by fellow suffragettes for "superhuman strength of spirit" as well as "sweet sympathy and gentleness", after getting hurt in an angry crowd throwing rotten apples at them at Bournemouth.

Clarke took part and was injured in the protests where many women were assaulted by the police, known as Black Friday, on 18 November 1910. She was arrested a few days later for window smashing after returning to protest, on 23 November 1910, and imprisoned for a month in HM Prison Holloway, where she was force-fed after going on a hunger strike. Clarke was released from prison on 23 December 1910, and spoke at a suffragette event, travelled to Brighton for another meeting, and returned to London.

She died two days later on 25 December 1910 at her brother's home in Winchmore Hill, London from a brain hemorrhage. She was described in her obituary by Emmeline Pethick-Lawrence as "the first woman martyr who has gone to death for this cause".

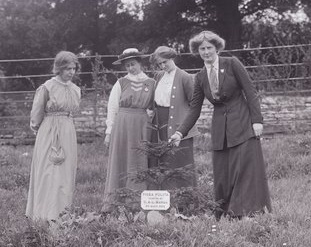
Annie Kenney (left) and other suffragettes planting memorial trees at Eagle House

In January 1911, suffragette leader Annie Kenney planted a memorial tree for her in the garden of the Blathwayts' Eagle House in Somerset, known as the Suffragette's Rest; it was a Cedrus deodara 'Pendula'.

== In popular culture ==
Mary Jane Clarke appears in the 2018 German docudrama We are half the World (Die Hälfte der Welt gehört uns) about the women's suffrage movement in Germany, France and the United Kingdom, played by Alexandra Schalaudek.

== Legacy and memorial ==
The suffragette memorial to Emmeline Pankhurst carries the names of nearly 60 leading suffragettes and suffragists who were part of the successful campaign to give the vote to women. Clarke was not included.

A campaign began in 2018 to have a statue of Mary Jane Clarke in the Pavilion Gardens, Brighton. A design by sculptor Denise Dutton was approved in 2020 by the Mayor of Brighton & Hove. It has all party support and charitable purposes for education and human rights awareness, as 'an image of female courage and political leadership, encouraging women and girls to participate in civic life and fostering a better understanding of women's history.'

The design maquette includes references to Black Friday in Votes for Women newspaper, examples of force-feeding implements, the Hunger Strike Medal and words from Emmeline Pankhurst: "She is the first to die. How many must follow… and also will have 'a lamp at her feet which she has placed there for others to pick up'." The Mary Clarke Statue Appeal is fundraising to complete the project, and its chair, Jean Calder, said:

"Nationally, women who have achieved a great deal are not commemorated. Mary was this extraordinary woman who made this huge sacrifice and yet she's been completely forgotten. I can't believe this would have happened to a man."

At the end of 2023 the Brighton and Hove City council agreed to award the freedom of the city to Clarke. The award was made to her great great great niece, Lena Goulden, in the presence of the mayor Jackie O'Quinn.
