= John Davison (politician) =

British Labour Party politician

John Emanuel Davison (28 November 1870 – 2 March 1927) was a Labour Party politician in the United Kingdom who served as a Member of Parliament (MP) from 1918 to 1926.

Davison was born in Smethwick, but grew up in Sheffield. He had a number of short-term jobs before completing an apprenticeship in iron founding, and joined the Friendly Society of Iron Founders (FSIF). He also studied at night school and qualified as a sanitary inspector. Davison became increasingly prominent in the FSIF, eventually becoming chairman of its executive and then its full-time national organiser. During World War I, he served on advisory councils for the Ministry of Munitions and the Board of Trade.

At the 1918 general election, he was elected as MP for the new Smethwick constituency on the outskirts of Birmingham. It was an unusual electoral contest, as there was no Conservative Party or Liberal Party candidate. Rather, his only opponent was Christabel Pankhurst of the Women's Party, who was supported by the alliance of the Conservative Party and the David Lloyd George-led Coalition Liberal faction.

Davison won the seat with a majority of only 775 votes, and was returned to the House of Commons at the 1922 general election with a margin of only 382 votes over his only opponent, a Conservative. He was re-elected by more comfortable margins at the 1923 general election and at the 1924 general election, but resigned his seat in 1926 due to poor health.

The resulting by-election on 21 December 1926, was won by the Labour candidate Oswald Mosley, who went on to found the New Party and the British Union of Fascists.

Davison died in March 1927, aged 56.

Parliament of the United Kingdom
| Preceded by (new constituency) | Member of Parliament for Smethwick; 1918–1926 | Succeeded by Oswald Mosley |
