= Melvina Walker =

British working class activist (born 1874)

- Born: Melvina Baker; Saint Helier, Jersey, Channel Islands
- Occupations: Working class activist and suffragette
- Organization(s): Women's Social and Political Union; East London Federation of Suffragettes
- Political party: Workers' Socialist Federation; Communist Party (British Section of the Third International)

Melvina Julia Walker (née Baker, born 1874) was a British working class activist and suffragette. She was a member of the Women's Social and Political Union (WSPU), the East London Federation of Suffragettes, Workers' Socialist Federation and the Communist Party (British Section of the Third International).

== Biography ==
Walker was born in 1874 in Saint Helier, Jersey, Channel Islands. She left school in her mid teenage years, and worked as a ladies maid and dressmaker. She married a dock worker, Oliver Walker, in 1907 and they lived on East India Dock Road in Poplar, London.

Walker was involved on the picket lines during the 1912 London dock strike and became a popular speaker, working class activist and suffragette in the East End of London. She was a member of the Women's Social and Political Union (WSPU) and the Worker's Socialist Federation. She was arrested for her suffrage activism in 1914 and was imprisoned in Holloway Prison.

Walker later joined Sylvia Pankhurst's East London Federation of Suffragettes (ELFS). With the ELFS, during World War I Walker protested against food shortages, rising food prices and class inequalities in food distribution. She wrote about the actions for the Women's Dreadnought newspaper, recounting raids on sugar in West End cafes and how working-class women who had queued unsuccessfully for potatoes ended up forcing a fried fish shop owner to part with his supplies.

In November 1918, Walker attended the first Labour Party Women's Conference as a delegate of the WSF, despite feeling that the Labour movement had been "captured" by middle-class women and that not enough working women had a platform to speak.

In May 1919, Walker was elected to the Poplar Trades Council and the Central Labour Party, alongside Norah Smyth and L. Watts. However, when the three appeared at a Labour Party meeting arguing in support of Bolshevism, they were expelled. After their expulsion, Walker, Smyth and Pankhurst formed the Communist Party (British Section of the Third International).

In 1932, Pankhurst described Walker, writing in The Home Front: A Mirror to Life in England During the World War that: "she seemed to me like a woman of the French Revolution. I could imagine her on the barricades, waving the bonnet rouge, urging on the fighters with impassioned cries. When in full flood of her oratory, she appeared the very embodiment of toiling, famine-ridden, proletarian womanhood."

Her later life and details about her death are unknown.
