= May O'Callaghan =

Irish suffragette and communist

- Born: August 14, 1881; Wexford
- Died: 1973
- Education: University of Vienna
- Political party: Communist Party (British Section of the Third International)

May O'Callaghan (14 August 1881 – 1973) known to many as O'C was a suffragette and communist.

== Life ==
Julia Mary 'May' O'Callaghan was born on 14 August 1881 in Wexford, Ireland, the youngest of four children to Catholics Julia and Patrick O'Callaghan. The family moved to Ballinsesker soon after she was born. Her father worked as a Head Constable in the Royal Irish Constabulary and her parents encouraged her interest in education. She studied Modern Languages at the University of Vienna, following an older sister to the city. Between 1901 and 1914 taught English and gave lectures on the Irish Literary Revival.

In 1916 she was writing letters on behalf of East London Federation of Suffragettes. This was a socialist suffragette organisation that broke away from Women's Social and Political Union. During this time she shared a flat with sisters Nellie and Rose Cohen, and Daisy Lansbury.

Along with Nellie Cohen, between 1919 and 1921 she ran the office of the People's Russian Information Bureau (established by Sylvia Pankhurst). She was also working as the sub-editor of the Worker's Dreadnought at this time. In 1919 the Communist Party (British Section of the Third International) was founded in the flat that she shared with Nellie Cohen and Daisy Lansbury.

In 1924 she travelled to Moscow where she stayed until 1928 and worked in the Translation Section of the Comintern Press Department. She lived in Hotel Lux during this time.
