= Abstentionism =

Political strategy in a legislature

Abstentionism is the political practice of standing for election to a deliberative assembly while refusing to take up any seats won or otherwise participate in the assembly's business. Abstentionism differs from an election boycott in that abstentionists participate in the election itself. Abstentionism has been used by Irish republican political movements in the United Kingdom and Ireland since the early 19th century. It was also used by Hungarian and Czech nationalists in the Austrian Imperial Council in the 1860s.

== Hungary ==
When suppressing the Hungarian Revolution of 1848, the Austrian Empire abolished the Diet of Hungary. Austria's 1861 February Patent reserved places for Hungary in the indirectly elected Imperial Council, but the Hungarians did not send representatives, arguing the council was usurping authority properly belonging to the Diet. Emulating the Hungarians, the Czech delegates for Bohemia withdrew in 1863, and those from Moravia in 1864. Hungarian demands were met by the Compromise of 1867, with the empire becoming the dual monarchy of Austria-Hungary in which the Hungarian half was ruled by a revived Diet.

In 1904, Arthur Griffith published The Resurrection of Hungary arguing for a British–Irish dual monarchy similar to the 1867 compromise. Griffith's subsequent "Sinn Féin policy" developed this model. Tom Kettle of the Irish Parliamentary Party (IPP) countered that Bohemia had remained in the Austrian half of the post-1867 empire, and its delegates abandoned abstentionism in 1879.

== Spain ==
The far-left Basque nationalist party Herri Batasuna (HB) refused to take its seats in the Cortes Generales, as well as the Basque Parliament and Parliament of Navarre, three bodies it viewed as illegitimate. HB abstained from participating in the Spanish and Basque parliaments until it was banned in 2001. It broke its absentionism in Navarre occasionally after 1987, often voting against the formation of the regional government.

Following the 1989 general election, HB announced its intention to end the policy and take up its seats in Madrid. However, neo-fascist agents attacked the HB delegation at a dinner party before the congress session began, killing deputy Josu Muguruza. Afterwards, the three attending deputies were refused entry after improperly taking own oaths, leading to the party continuing abstentionism.

HB's successor, Batasuna, participated in the Communist Party of the Basque Homelands (EHAK) in the 2005 Basque regional election, as Batasuna itself was forbidden by the Supreme Court to run in elections. after which it cast invalid votes during the appointment of the lehendakari (head of state government). Batasuna did not participate in Spanish or Navarrese elections. The modern left-wing Basque nationalist party, EH Bildu, does not practice abstentionism.

== Ireland ==
=== Before partition ===
After the Act of Union 1800, Ireland was represented in the British Parliament of the United Kingdom of Great Britain and Ireland, in the House of Lords and the House of Commons. Repeal of the Act of Union was a goal of many Irish nationalists.

In 1845, a motion was carried at the Repeal Association's committee for all Irish members of parliament (MPs) to withdraw from Westminster. It was proposed by Thomas Osborne Davis of the Young Ireland movement. However, the committee felt that MPs already sitting could not withdraw without breaking the oath of office they had taken upon election. The Irish Confederation, which withdrew from the Repeal Association in 1847, resolved in favour of immediate abstention; however, its founder William Smith O'Brien continued to speak at Westminster. In 1848, Charles Gavan Duffy proposed that Irish MPs expelled from Westminster should sit in a separate Irish parliament.

Other early abstentionist advocates included George Sigerson in 1862, and John Dillon in 1878, who envisaged abstentionist Irish MPs meeting in a separate Irish parliament.

From the 1860s, Irish Republican Brotherhood (IRB) leaders Charles Kickham and John O'Leary favoured abstentionism. In 1869, G. H. Moore suggested nominating imprisoned republicans for election, knowing they were precluded as convicted felons from taking seats. On this basis, Jeremiah O'Donovan Rossa (in 1870) and John Mitchel (twice in 1875) were returned at by-elections in County Tipperary; O'Donovan Rossa was in prison at his election, while Mitchel was in exile.

Kickham envisaged a "great national conference" calling on Irish MPs to withdraw from Westminster. A motion to that effect was proposed by Charles Guilfoyle Doran and passed at the convention of the Home Rule League. "Honest" John Martin, "independent nationalist" MP for County Meath from 1871 to 1875, spoke in Westminster only to raise nationalist protests, and refused to vote. At the 1874 general election, 59 Home Rule MPs were returned, including John O'Connor Power in County Mayo, who was a member of the IRB Supreme Council. He was to fall out with the IRB over allegations of misappropriating election funds, and became progressively less radical. O'Connor Power believed that Westminster was the best platform to argue Ireland's case for self-government. Withdrawal from Parliament would be an abandonment of the Home Rule party to those who favoured conciliation rather than confrontation. By 1876 it was clear that the HRL would never be able to organise a national convention, and MPs elected with its endorsement would remain at Westminster. An alternative to abstentionism was obstructionism, including the use of filibuster. This was practised by the HRL and its successor, the IPP under Charles Stuart Parnell from the late 1870s.

==== Sinn Féin ====
Arthur Griffith's "Sinn Féin Policy", formulated between 1905 and 1907, called for Irish MPs to abstain from Westminster and sit in a parallel parliament in Dublin. The first Sinn Féin abstentionist candidate was Charles Dolan in 1908. Having sat as MP for North Leitrim for the IPP, he resigned after joining Sinn Féin, and lost the ensuing by-election. Laurence Ginnell's 1909 proposal that the United Ireland League (UIL) adopt abstentionism caused a near-riot; he left the UIL but continued to sit at Westminster until he joined Sinn Féin in 1917. Abstentionism was opposed by most nationalists, especially after the January 1910 general election when the IPP held the balance of power at Westminster and secured passage of the Third Home Rule Bill from the Liberal government. The nationalist mood changed after the 1916 Rising, and the IPP itself withdrew from Westminster in April 1918, to protest against the extension of conscription to Ireland. At the 1916 West Cork by-election, Sinn Féin initially endorsed All-for-Ireland League candidate Frank J. Healy, a supporter interned after the 1916 Rising, but withdrew support when Healy declared his intention to take his seat; the confusion contributed to Healy's defeat.

The first abstentionist MP elected was George Noble Plunkett after the North Roscommon by-election of 3 February 1917. Plunkett did not categorically state his abstentionism until after his victory. Plunkett's Liberty League, Griffith's monarchist Sinn Féin, and the northern Irish Nation League merged later that year into a reconstituted Sinn Féin, agreeing after contentious disputation that abstentionism was a principle rather than merely a tactic. Sinn Féin MPs elected at the 1918 general election refused to take their seats at Westminster and instead constituted themselves in Dublin in January 1919 as the TDs (Teachtaí Dála) of Dáil Éireann, which was claimed to be the legitimate parliament of the Irish Republic. The Irish Labour Party stood aside in 1918 in favour of Sinn Féin, having at first proposed to be abstentionist until emergency laws were lifted. Sinn Féin was unsure whether to boycott the 1921 elections to the House of Commons of Northern Ireland and House of Commons of Southern Ireland set up by the Government of Ireland Act 1920. It decided to contest the Northern election for tactical reasons and the Southern one for consistency, with its returned MPs becoming the TDs of the Second Dáil.

One strand within Republicanism, in remaining loyal to this pre-Partition Irish Republic, denies the legitimacy of both the Republic of Ireland and Northern Ireland. Other parties reached accommodation with the southern state but not Northern Ireland. Some groups have boycotted elections within either jurisdiction; others have been abstentionist; others abstained from some bodies but not others. Abstentionism has often been a divisive issue within Republicanism.

=== Irish Free State/Republic of Ireland ===
The 1921 Anglo-Irish Treaty established the Irish Free State, with an opt-out for Northern Ireland and requiring an Oath of Allegiance for Free State legislators. The Treaty split Sinn Féin, mainly over the Oath rather than "Partition", and caused the Irish Civil War. The June 1922 election featured a "Sinn Féin panel" of pro- and anti-Treaty candidates, but the resulting 3rd Dáil was boycotted by the anti-Treaty TDs. These refounded Sinn Féin in 1923 and based their continued abstention from the Free State Dáil on Partition. Fianna Fáil split from Sinn Féin in 1926 and abandoned abstentionism in the Free State in 1927. From 1955, Sinn Féin contested local elections in the Republic of Ireland and took its seats, arguing this did not amount to recognising the state.

In 1970, at its Ardfheis (annual conference), Sinn Féin split again on the issue of whether or not to reverse its long-standing policy of refusing to take seats in Dáil Éireann. The split created two parties calling themselves "Sinn Féin". The anti-abstentionist party was known as "Official" Sinn Féin. It changed its name to "Sinn Féin the Workers Party" (SFWP) and won a seat in the Dáil in the general election of 1981, which it took. The following year it dropped "Sinn Féin" from its name to become "The Workers' Party". The abstentionist party was initially referred to as "Provisional" Sinn Féin, but after 1982 it was known simply as "Sinn Féin"; it continued to abstain from taking seats won in all institutions.

Sinn Féin split in 1986, as in 1970, over whether to take seats in Dáil Éireann. The larger group led by Gerry Adams abandoned abstentionism, while Republican Sinn Féin (RSF), led by Ruairí Ó Brádaigh, retained it. Sinn Féin's first sitting Teachta Dála was Caoimhghín Ó Caoláin, elected in Cavan–Monaghan at the 1997 general election.

RSF has retained the policy of abstentionism from both Dáil Éireann and the Northern Ireland Assembly.

=== Northern Ireland ===
After Partition, most non-abstentionist parties in the southern state did not organise at all in Northern Ireland. In early 1922, the Provisional Government of the Irish Free State was seen as representing the interests of nationalists in Northern Ireland and had a policy of not recognising the Northern Irish government. Catholic bishop Joseph MacRory (who later became Archbishop of Armagh and a Cardinal) indicated to the Provisional Government that Joe Devlin and his party members wanted to enter the new Parliament of Northern Ireland, and was worried that the policy of non-recognition would result in Northern Irish nationalists having to "fight alone", but his advice was ignored.

Abstentionism at local elections was effectively prohibited by a 1934 law requiring candidates to take an oath to attend council sessions.

The Nationalist Party did not take their seats during the first Stormont parliament (1921–1925). Despite forming the second-largest parliamentary party, they did not accept the role of Opposition for a further forty years. They did so on 2 February 1965 but withdrew from opposition again in October 1968, two weeks after police batoned demonstrators at a civil rights march in Derry on 5 October 1968.

Cahir Healy was elected to both the Stormont and Westminster parliaments under a variety of nationalist labels between the 1920s and the 1960s. He was abstentionist in Stormont until 1927 and at Westminster from 1950 to 1952. In the 1930s, Healy led the Irish Union Association, which supported his policy of intermittent tactical abstentionism, whereas the otherwise-similar Northern Council for Unity regarded abstentionism as a principle.

From 1953, Stormont candidates were required to take the British oath of allegiance before standing, precluding Sinn Féin from doing so. This did not apply at Westminster elections, where Sinn Féin often gave non-Sinn Féin abstentionist nationalists a free run to avoid splitting the nationalist vote, but conversely fielded a spoiler candidate against non-abstentionist nationalists.

The Social Democratic and Labour Party (SDLP) became the Opposition on its formation on 21 August 1970 but that party withdrew from Stormont in July 1971. The SDLP participated in the assembly set up for the Sunningdale Agreement, and in the Constitutional Convention. It originally intended to boycott the election to the 1982 Assembly, but adopted abstentionism to avoid giving a free run to Sinn Féin. Brian Feeney suggests that Sinn Féin's "active abstention", where those elected acted as local spokespeople in the media, was more effective than the SDLP's policy of sending its representatives instead to the New Ireland Forum in Dublin. The SDLP's participation in the 1996–98 Northern Ireland Forum was intermittent.

Sinn Féin adopted the "Armalite and ballot box strategy" in 1981, and first contested modern elections in Northern Ireland with the 1982 Assembly elections, from which they abstained. The 1983 ardfheis resolved to take seats in the European Parliament, as the 1985 ardfheis did for that year's local elections. Sinn Féin abstained from the Northern Ireland Forum.

Since the establishment of the Northern Ireland Assembly under the 1998 Good Friday Agreement, both the SDLP and Sinn Féin have taken their seats in that body. SDLP MPs have consistently taken their seats in Westminster, in contrast to Sinn Féin MPs, who refuse to take their seats there. Sinn Féin MPs believe that as British political institutions should play no part in governing the people of Ireland, they as MPs should not make decisions on behalf of British people.

Fianna Fáil's sole Stormont election came in 1933, when its leader Éamon de Valera agreed to stand as an abstentionist for South Down, where he had been a Sinn Féin MP in the 1920s. Fianna Fáil registered as a political party within Northern Ireland in 2007. In 2014 its leader Micheál Martin announced it would contest elections from 2019. It has not made clear whether it will contest elections to Westminster.

Republican Sinn Féin continue their long standing policy of abstentionism. It is not a registered party in Northern Ireland, but members have contested the Assembly elections as independents. When Saoradh, a dissident republican party, was established in 2016, it had not decided whether to contest elections, but said it would in any case abstain from taking up any seats won in Stormont, Westminster or Leinster House.

After the 2017 UK general election, which resulted in a hung parliament with the Conservatives forming an agreement with the DUP, Gerry Adams reiterated Sinn Féin's long-standing position that their elected MPs would not swear allegiance to the monarch nor take their seats in Westminster.

== United Kingdom ==
Some British political activists were themselves inspired by Sinn Féin's policy of abstentionism, one of which was the Glaswegian anarcho-communist Guy Aldred, who advised the Scottish socialist politician John Maclean to adopt the "Sinn Féin tactic" during the 1918 United Kingdom general election, citing a passage from The Civil War in France in which Karl Marx charged that "the working class cannot simply lay hold of the ready-made State machinery, and wield it for its own purposes". Aldred proposed the fielding of communist candidates on an abstentionist platform, outlining that:

Successful candidates would not go to parliament, but would remain in their constituencies till they had a quorum, then they would constitute an assembly, insisting on the right to represent the district which elected them. Thus a dual authority is established[,] which could possibly spread like wild-fire, as these innovations do, and eventually challenge the state.

Aldred additionally proposed the organisation of an election boycott or the use of elections as little more than a straw poll to gauge support for the communist movement, both tactics which he supported alongside that of abstentionism. By 1919, Aldred's call to abstentionism was also taken up by Sylvia Pankhurst's Workers' Socialist Federation, which took an anti-parliamentary line even against the wishes of the Bolsheviks in the Third International, and E. T. Whitehead's Labour Abstentionist Party, which would both become founding organisations of the Communist Party. To contrast, the Bolsheviks criticised abstentionism and advocated for the creation of "a new, unusual, non-opportunist, non-careerist parliamentarism", a tactic which they described as "revolutionary parliamentarism". Disillusioned with Bolshevism, Pankhurst's group later joined the Communist Workers' International and reaffirmed their commitment to abstentionism, while Aldred himself established the Anti-Parliamentary Communist Federation and ran in the 1922 election for the seat of Glasgow Shettleston on an abstentionist platform (winning only 1.9% of the vote). Aldred's election run was criticised by Pankhurst herself who, despite by this point having moved to a policy of electoral boycott, supported the candidacy of John MacLean's Scottish Workers' Republican Party. After World War II, Aldred contested the 1945 general election on an abstentionist platform, this time for the seat of Glasgow Central as a member of the United Socialist Movement, netting only 300 votes.

== Canada ==
Following the 2022 Quebec general election, members of the Parti Quebecois were denied their seats in the National Assembly of Quebec by speaker Nathalie Roy after they refused to swear the Oath of Allegiance to King Charles III. The requirement to swear the oath was later removed.

== United States ==
The Maine House of Representatives provides non-voting seats to delegates from three Native American tribes: the Penobscot, Passamaquoddy, and Maliseet; since 2015, the Penobscot have refused to send delegates in protest over issues of tribal sovereignty. The Maliseet refused to send a delegate from 2018 until 2025 for the same reasons.

== See also ==
- Election boycott
- Irish republican legitimatism
- Oath of Allegiance (Ireland)
- Oath of Allegiance (UK)
- Quorum Busting- parliamentary tactic in which members physically leave the chamber to obstruct legislative procedure
- Testimonial party

== General and cited sources ==
- Feeney, Brian (2002). Sinn Féin: A Hundred Turbulent Years. O'Brien Press. ISBN 978-0-86278-770-7.
- Lydon, James F. (1998). The Making of Ireland: From Ancient Times to the Present. Routledge. ISBN 0-415-01347-X.
- McGee, Owen (2005). The IRB: The Irish Republican Brotherhood from the Land League to Sinn Féin. Dublin: Four Courts Press. ISBN 1-85182-972-5.
- Shipway, Mark (1988). Anti-Parliamentary Communism: The Movement for Workers' Councils in Britain, 1917–45. London: Macmillan. ISBN 033343613X. OCLC 468642120 – via AF-North.
