= Communist Party of South Wales and the West of England =

Political party in Great Britain

The Communist Party of South Wales and the West of England was a political party in Britain, formed in September 1920. The group was formed by a minority within the South Wales Socialist Society, that did not support merging into the Communist Party of Great Britain.

The group was sympathetic to the Communist Party (British Section of the Third International) of Sylvia Pankhurst, and adopted the programme of its previous group, the Workers Socialist Federation.

The group held a conference in Cardiff in November 1920, during which it declared that communist unity could be achieved only on the basis of "local autonomy in a given local area".

A.J. Cook was a leading member of the group.
