= National Unemployed Workers' Movement =

The National Unemployed Workers' Movement was a British organisation set up in 1921 by members of the Communist Party of Great Britain. It aimed at drawing attention to the plight of unemployed workers during the post-First World War slump, the 1926 General Strike and later the Great Depression, and at fighting the Means Test.

== Activities ==
The NUWM was founded by Wal Hannington and led in Scotland by Harry McShane. From 1921 until 1929 it was called the National Unemployed Workers' Committee Movement. The NUWM became the foremost body responsible for organising the unemployed on a national basis in the interwar period, these years being characterised by high levels of unemployment. A central element of its activities was a series of hunger marches to London, organised in 1922, 1929, 1930, 1932, 1934 and 1936. The largest of these was the National Hunger March, 1932, which was followed by some days of serious violence across central London with 75 people being badly injured, which in turn led directly to the formation of the National Council for Civil Liberties.

To the dismay of many within the wider labour movement, the Labour Party and the official trades union bodies offered little support to the legions of unemployed workers during this period. The Trades Union Congress and the National Executive Council advised Labour parties and trades councils along the route of the Jarrow Crusade not to help the marchers, although local branches were more generous.

== Industrial unionist breakaway ==
In 1923 Gunnar Soderberg led a breakaway group called the Unemployed Workers' Organisation (UWO), the views of which were based on the industrial unionism of the Industrial Workers of the World. They objected to the abandonment of the revolutionary goal of abolishing the wages system in favour of work at trade union rates or maintenance at trade union rates. They had close links to Communist Workers Party but only gained a significant following in Poplar during the 1923 Docks Strike. It did not survive long after a physical attack on its members on 26 September 1923 in Poplar High Street by the police, which left 40 members in hospital. Wal Hannington filled in for George Lansbury at a meeting held in Glasgow City Hall shortly afterwards. He criticised the UWO and defended the actions of the Poplar Board of Guardians, who had called in the police.

== End of the NUWM ==
It suspended activity in 1939, at the outbreak of the Second World War, and the decision to wind it up was taken in 1943. It was finally dissolved in 1946. Over the years there have been several attempts to revive the movement, one of the most recent being around 1992.

== See also ==
- Unemployed Councils
- Workers Alliance of America
