= Zelie Emerson =

American-born suffragette in England (1883–1969)

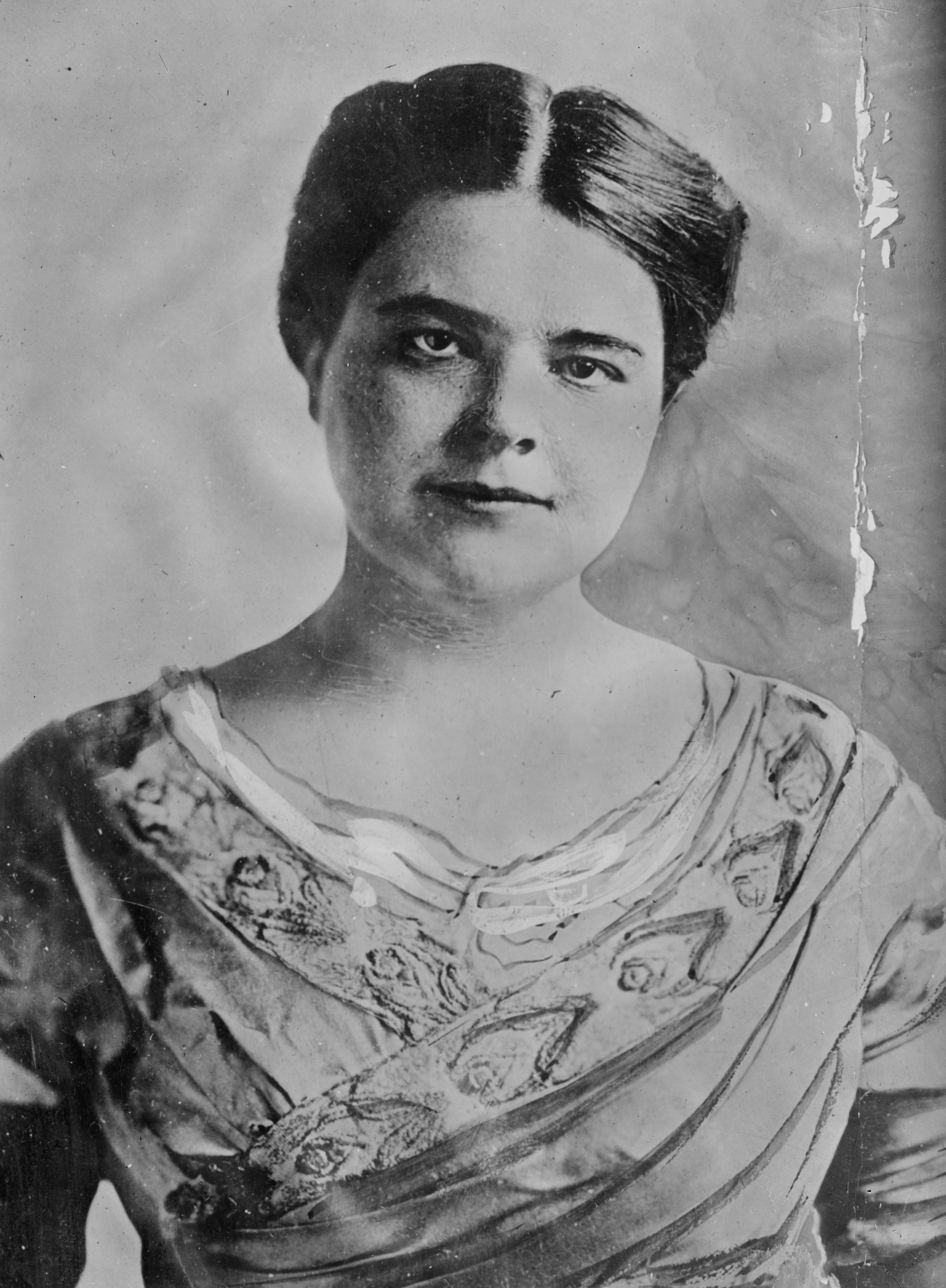
- Born: 1883; Jackson, Michigan, U.S.
- Died: 1969 (aged 85–86); Lakeland, Florida, U.S.
- Known for: Founded the Workers' Dreadnought newspaper

Zelie Passavant Emerson (1883 – March 1969) was an American suffragette active in England. She suggested and then founded the Workers' Dreadnought newspaper with Sylvia Pankhurst. She was injured by London police in a suffrage riot in 1913.

== Early life ==
Zelie Passavant was born in Jackson, Michigan, the daughter of Hubbard Rufus Emerson and Zelie Passavant Emerson. Her grandfather was a Lutheran minister, William Passavant; her great-grandmother Fredericka "Zelie" Basse Passavant was the inspiration for the town name of Zelienople, Pennsylvania. Zelie's mother was linked romantically with Andrew Carnegie as a young woman, and remained a friend and correspondent of the industrialist into later life.

== Career ==
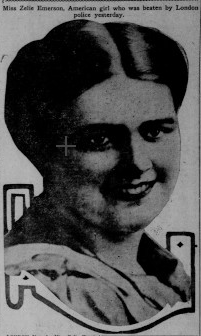
Emerson in 1913

Emerson was active in the labor movement in Chicago for several years, and worked at the Northwestern University Settlement house. She then met Sylvia Pankhurst on her U.S. tour and moved to England and became active in the Women's Social and Political Union in London, then in the breakaway group, the East London Federation of Suffragettes. In 1912, she joined Pankhurst in opening the organization's headquarters in Bow Road in East London. Pankhurst wrote that Emerson recognised that the working class audience appreciated that winning the women's suffrage would benefit the men also.

Pankhurst and Emerson were arrested for violent demonstrating, including throwing stones at Bow police station in February 1913, and sentenced to six weeks in Holloway Prison. Out on bail, the two demonstrated again, and were sentenced to two months' hard labour. On one occasion Emerson was spared arrest, when she with two others approached and whipped Dr. Forward who had force-fed her while she was in jail for five weeks, declaring that he was unfit to practice and that he 'should be force-fed himself'. The doctor stated that he was unhurt in the incident. Emerson was released after a hunger strike, forced feeding, solitary confinement, and a [suicide]] attempt, after seven weeks. Her widowed mother came to London to advocate for her release as did American senator Charles E. Townsend.

Emerson served on the Committee for the Repeal of the Prisoners' Act in 1913. In November 1913, she was injured by London police in a suffrage riot. She was found to have a concussion, but within a month was arrested again for rioting. Charges against her in this incident were dismissed. After experiencing direct police brutality, Emerson became a believer in the necessity of self-defense training for suffragettes. She decided to join the suffragettes' efforts in drilling in the use of clubs, boxing, and jiu-jitsu. Emerson testified at one trial that she had decided to carry a "Saturday night club," a rope dipped in tar and weighted with lead, to defend herself against the police.

In 1914, at Emerson's suggestion, Pankhurst and other members of the East London Federation of Suffragettes launched a newspaper, Workers' Dreadnought. When Emerson was arrested again in 1914, there was talk of expelling her from the country, under the Aliens Act. In poor health from her skull injury and the trauma of force-feeding, she was not to return to campaigning in the UK after "visiting" at her mother's house in Michigan by May 1914, and she moved to Florida with her mother in 1916.

In 1931, newspapers reported that Emerson owned and operated a grapefruit orchard in Lakeland, Florida. In 1958, Emerson and another woman citrus grower, Bessie Bruce, sued their county and the state over drainage plans that would negatively affect their crops.

== Personal life ==
Emerson died in 1969, aged 85 years, in Florida. She is interred in Jackson, Michigan.
