= Norah Smyth =

British suffragette, photographer and socialist (1874–1962)

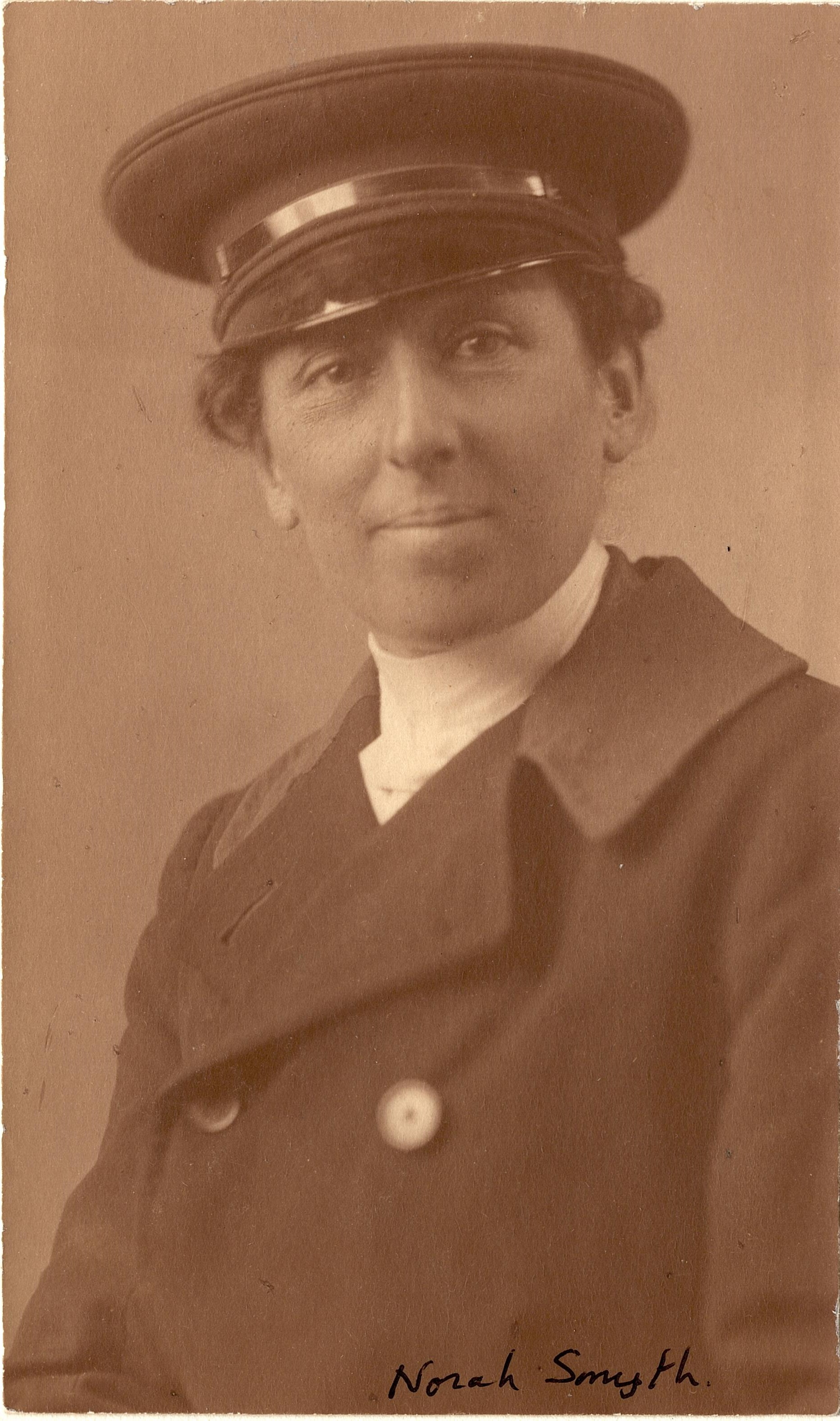
- Norah Lyle-Smyth in chauffeur's uniform, c 1912.
- Born: 22 March 1874
- Died: 30 July 1962
- Burial place: St. Bartholomew's Churchyard, Barrow, Cheshire
- Occupations: Suffragette, photographer
- Employer(s): Workers' Dreadnought; Times of Malta
- Organization(s): Pioneer Players; Women's Social and Political Union; East London Federation of Suffragettes
- Political party: Labour Party (UK); Communist Party of Great Britain; Communist Workers' Party (UK)
- Relatives: Ethel Smyth (aunt)

Norah Lyle-Smyth (22 March 1874 – 30 July 1962) was a British suffragette, photographer and socialist activist.

== Early life ==
Smyth was born on 22 March 1874, into a wealthy family, and was the niece of the composer and suffragette Ethel Smyth. She was raised in Cheshire in a turreted mansion. Until his death in 1912, Smyth's father controlled many aspects of her life, refusing her permission to attend university or marry her cousin, as she had hoped. Instead, she devoted her time to private study, the arts, and village life.

== Activism ==
In 1912, Smyth joined the Pioneer Players, Edith Craig's feminist theatre company. Also around this time, she joined the Women's Social and Political Union (WSPU), working as an unpaid chauffeur for Emmeline Pankhurst, and undertaking various other tasks for the WSPU headquarters. However, her greatest interest was in promoting the cause of working women, and this led her to join Sylvia Pankhurst's East London Federation of Suffragettes (ELFS). She financed the publication of their weekly newspaper, the Woman’s Dreadnought (later the Worker's Dreadnought).

In 1912 Smyth was involved in an arson attack on the country home of the vehemently anti women's suffrage politician Lewis Harcourt. She managed to escape capture and go abroad, and only confided the story to her nephew many years later. She claimed the attack was on an empty part of the house to minimise risk to life and the artworks it contained.

After returning to England, at New Year in 1914, Smyth was with Sylvia in Victoria Park, Hackney, when Sylvia was arrested after the expiration of her Cat and Mouse Act license.

In early 1914, the ELFS formed a "People's Army of Defence", which Smyth led. The army drilled every Tuesday night. It undertook a parade in Ford Road, but Smyth was arrested for assault, and the idea was dropped.

In 1914, Sylvia was called to Paris to discuss the future of the ELFS with Christabel Pankhurst, leader of the WSPU. Smyth accompanied Sylvia, making travel arrangements and organising disguises, in order that Sylvia could avoid arrest on public order charges. Sylvia and Christabel agreed on a clean split between their groups.

Smyth remained active in the East London group and when, in 1916, it became the Women's Suffrage Federation (WSF), she was chosen as its treasurer. Although generally seen as a loyal supporter of Sylvia Pankhurst, Smyth was sometimes able to change her opinion; for example, she strongly advised her to remain active in the Women's International League for Peace and Freedom (WILPF) when Sylvia had been planning to resign. She was also concerned, in her role as treasurer, that as Sylvia became more outspoken against World War I and, later, in support of communism, that it was discouraging donations to the WSF. When the WSF set up a toy factory, Smyth was a strong supporter, and when in 1920 the factory was in financial difficulties, Smyth sold personal items to bail it out.

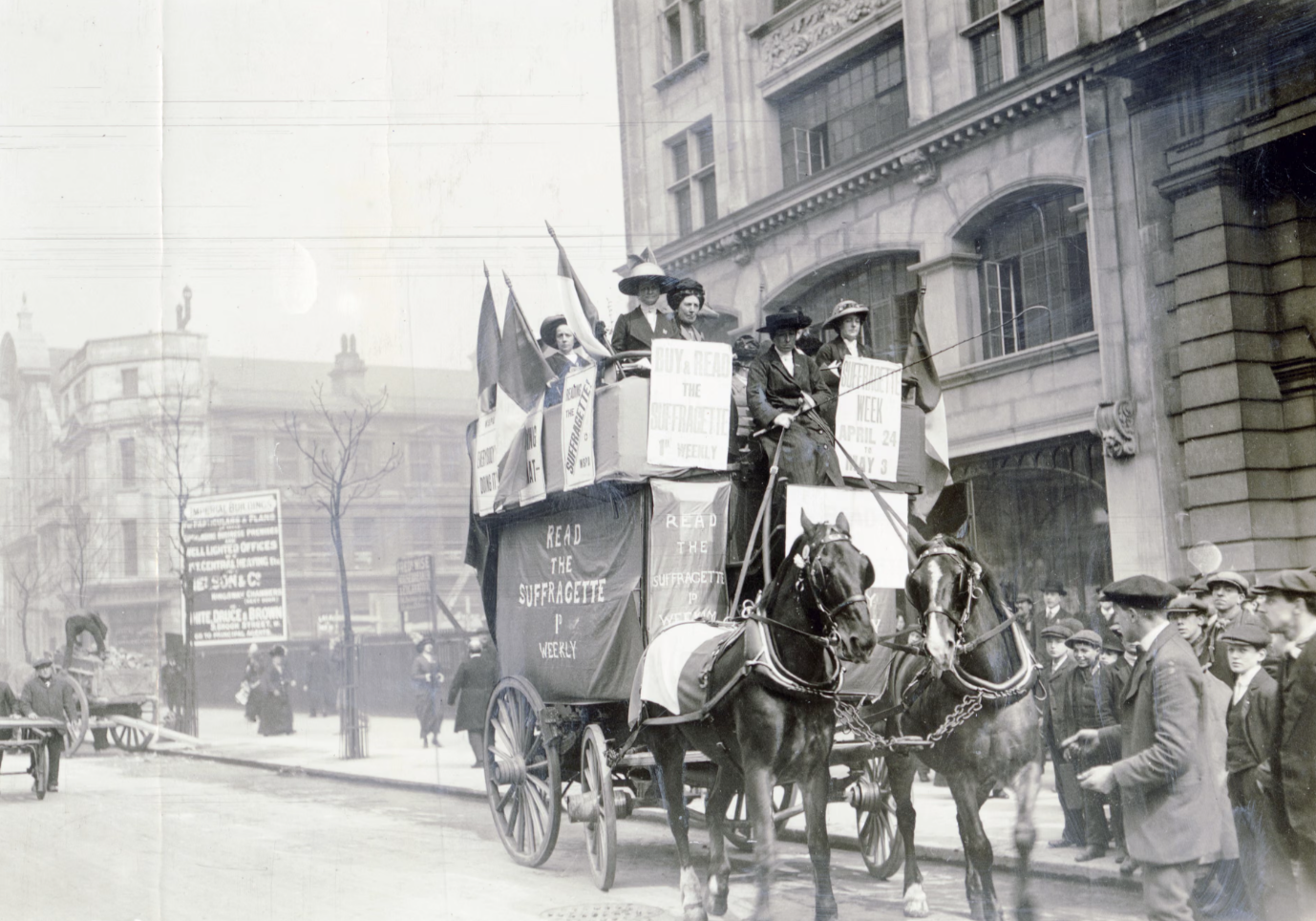
Carriage advertising The Suffragette with Norah Smyth driving in 1912

The WSF also became involved in the Labour Party, and Smyth was elected to the Poplar Trades Council and Central Labour Party in 1919, alongside Melvina Walker and L. Watts. However, when the three appeared at a Labour Party meeting arguing in support of Bolshevism, they were expelled.

The WSF became the core of the Communist Party (British Section of the Third International), and when the editor of its newspaper, the Workers' Dreadnought, was imprisoned, Smyth alternated as acting editor with Jack O'Sullivan. For many years, Smyth had used her photography skills to provide pictures for the newspaper of East End life, particularly of women and children living in poverty.

After a period in the Communist Party of Great Britain, Smyth followed Sylvia Pankhurst into a new, left communist, organisation, the Communist Workers' Party. She was a prominent member and one of the leading speakers for the new party, alongside Pankhurst and A. Kingman. The party soon dissolved.

== Later life ==
Smyth later moved to Florence, Italy, to live with her brother Maxwell Smyth, and worked as a secretary. Her friend Mabel Strickland then offered her a job with the Times of Malta, which Smyth accepted, and she moved to Mdina. She lived in Malta for the duration of World War II, during which time she protested against the exclusion of women from the cigarette ration and accused the Lieutenant-Governor of Hamrun of excluding women from being part of the population.

After the war, Smyth moved to Letterkenny, County Donegal, Ireland, to live with her sister, Una Maud Lyle Smyth. Smyth continued to correspond with Pankhurst until her death.

Smyth allegedly cut her own gravestone, before her death on 30 July 1962. She is buried in St. Bartholomew's Churchyard, Barrow, Cheshire.

== Legacy ==
In November 2018 an exhibition of Smyth's previously unseen photographs held by the Institute of Social History in Amsterdam opened in London's Four Corners gallery.

Party political offices
Preceded by Edgar Lansbury	Honorary Treasurer of the Women's Suffrage Federation; 1916–1920	Organisation dissolved
