= E. T. Whitehead =

British political activist (1890–1956)

Edgar Thoreau Whitehead (1890–1956) was a British political activist who served on the executive of the Communist Party of Great Britain but later became a fascist.

== Early life ==
Born in Venice, Whitehead was educated at Verdin Technical School, Witton Grammar School, and St Paul's College, Cheltenham before completing a degree at the University of London. He graduated in 1910, spending time in Russia, then Germany, Austria and Belgium. He returned to the UK on the outbreak of World War I and became active in opposition to the war. In 1918, he appears to have organised a minor mutiny in the Army Labour Corps, and as a result was imprisoned until the end of the war.

== Life on the far left ==
Whitehead was supportive of Sylvia Pankhurst's Workers' Socialist Federation (WSF), but instead of joining, he formed his own Labour Abstentionist Party. The party adopted the aim of "the collective well-being of the people" and argued that the workers' movement should adopt Sinn Féin's tactic of standing Parliamentary candidates, who if elected, would refuse to take their seats. Whitehead successfully persuaded Tom Mann to write.

In 1920, the WSF called a meeting to found a communist party in the UK, although other than the WSF, all the attendees represented small and localised groups. It founded a new party, the Communist Party (British Section of the Third International) (CP-BSTI), and Whitehead became its secretary. This party adopted the Labour Abstentionist Party's policy on Parliamentary action, at odds with the policy of the new Communist Party of Great Britain (CPGB).

Although Whitehead maintained that he was opposed to CPGB members becoming Members of Parliament, and also argued against communists becoming paid trade union officials, he agreed with Pankhurst that these need not be a barrier to unity, and with Albert Inkpin of the CPGB, Jack Leckie and George Peet he signed a call for a conference to unite the British communist movement.

The conference agreed to merge the CP-BSTI and various small groups into a refounded CPGB. This was achieved in 1921, and Whitehead served as a CP-BSTI member of its executive committee for a year, after which he lost his seat. He also became secretary of the British Section of the Workers' International Famine Relief Committee, represented Britain on the Workers' International Russian Relief Committee, and chaired the party's West London branch. While Pankhurst soon left the CPGB and formed a new group, Whitehead remained active in the CPGB for while longer, but then left to join the Labour Party, and began writing articles opposing communism.

== Life on the far right as Edgar Bray ==
Whitehead met Sophie Bray, a Russian exile, and began an affair with her. He later left his wife to move in with Bray, and eventually changed his name to Edgar Bray. The couple became supportive of fascism and antisemitism, and joined the British Union of Fascists. In 1933, Edgar wrote to the German Embassy asking how he could assist the Nazi cause, and they directed him to Hans Thost, a German spy in London. He had no immediate use for them, and British intelligence intercepted Edgar's letter.

Bray subsequently became an accountant. In 1942, MI5 agent Eric Roberts, posing as a Gestapo agent, recruited the Brays into a fake spy ring. Edgar produced some information on British military developments, although it would have been of little value. In 1945, Edgar wrote to George VI opposing the decision to execute William Joyce.
