= South Wales Socialist Society =

Federation of communist groups in Wales

The South Wales Socialist Society was a federation of communist groups in Wales, with many of its members being coal miners. It was a founder constituent of the Communist Party of Great Britain.

It was formed as the Rhondda Socialist Society in 1911 by participants in the Miners Reform Movement, which opposed right-wing trade union leaders. The group had little central organisation, being based on largely autonomous local clubs. It enthusiastically supported the October Revolution and entered into unity negotiations, with the aim of forming a communist party.

The group was opposed to participation in Parliament and so sided with the Socialist Labour Party (SLP) and the Workers Socialist Federation (WSF) in the discussions. In March 1920, after the Comintern suggested that its British section should attempt to affiliate to the Labour Party, the majority of the group became a branch of the SLP, and a small section formed the Communist Party of South Wales and the West of England with the same programme as the WSF.

In April, eight remaining local clubs formed the "South Wales Communist Council", and concluded negotiations. Although the group no longer had the resources to hold a ballot, it became part of the new Communist Party of Great Britain, on whose Central Committee they were represented by W. J. Hewlett.
