= Unemployed Workers' Organisation =

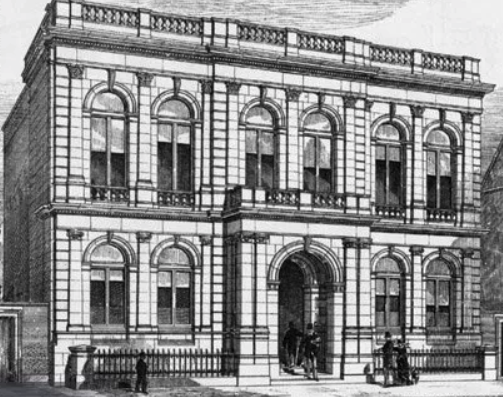
Bromley Public Hall, which was where the UWO originally had their offices

The Unemployed Workers' Organisation was an organisation of unemployed workers founded in London in 1923. It was a breakaway from the National Unemployed Workers' Movement (NUWM). They opposed the reformist politics and political control by the Communist Party of Great Britain. It was founded by Gunnar Soderberg (also known as Harry), a London organiser of the NUWM. The organisation was formed following the 1922 Unemployed March organised by the NUWM, whose objectives the UWO believed had been moderated in order to gain acceptance with the Labour Party.

== Manifesto ==
The "Manifesto of the Unemployed Workers' Organisation" was published on the front page of Workers' Dreadnought on Saturday 7 July 1923. The Manifesto started by differentiating itself from the NUWM which was viewed as being useless. This was attributed to a political leadership who knew nothing of working class experience. The manifesto advocated a "better policy which was based on the opening paragraphs of "The working class and the employing class have nothing in common. There can be no peace so long as hunger and want are found among millions of the working people and the Preamble of the IWW: few, who make up the employing class, have all the good things of life. Between these two classes a struggle must go on until the workers of the world organize as a class, take possession of the means of production, abolish the wage system, and live in harmony with the Earth. "The manifesto committed the organisation to direct action and rejected affiliation to any political party. The address given was that of the Bromley Public Hall, Bow Road, in the Metropolitan Borough of Poplar, London. A week later they had moved their address to Poplar Town Hall, Poplar High Street."
