= Gunnar Soderberg =

Swedish labour activist

Gunnar Soderberg (born 1896) was a Swedish labour activist. He was the founder of the Unemployed Workers' Organisation in London in 1923.
