= Workers' Dreadnought =

English communist newspaper

- For International Socialism
- Type: Weekly newspaper
- Format: Broadsheet
- Owner: Workers' Socialist Federation
- Founder: Sylvia Pankhurst
- Publisher: Dreadnought Publications
- Editor: Sylvia Pankhurst
- General manager: Harold Burgess
- Founded: 8 March 1914
- Ceased publication: 14 June 1924
- Political alignment: Left communism; Marxist Feminism
- Headquarters: 152 Fleet Street, London
- Country: United Kingdom
- Circulation: 10,000 (as of 1917)

Workers' Dreadnought was a communist newspaper based in London led by Sylvia Pankhurst that ran from 1914 to 1924. It was the official paper of the East London Federation of Suffragettes before being the official paper of the Communist Party (British Section of the Third International).

== History ==
=== As The Woman's Dreadnought ===
The British suffragette Sylvia Pankhurst started the newspaper at the suggestion of Norah Smyth and American suffragette Zelie Emerson, after Pankhurst had been expelled from the Women's Social and Political Union (WSPU) by her mother and sister for branching off and forming the East London Federation of Suffragettes (ELFS). The group differed from its parent organisation in being democratic and including men, such as George Lansbury. Pankhurst also wanted an explicitly socialist organisation tackling wider issues than women's suffrage, aligned with the Independent Labour Party, based among working class people in the East End of London. She wanted to focus on collective workers' action, not individual attacks on property, which the WSPU was famous for. Provisionally titled Workers' Mate, "mate" being a familiar term of address in East London, the newspaper, an articulation of the women's suffrage and emancipation movement in the East End, first appeared in March 21, 1914, as The Woman's Dreadnought, a title suggested by Mary Patterson. Its initial ciriculation was 20,000 with a readership between was 8,000 and 10,000. In 1914, suffragettes would sell the paper almost daily and hold meetings near the East End docks.

In August 1914, Pankhurst reported firsthand from Dublin about the Bachelor's Walk massacre, in which British troops had fired into a crowd of Irish people. The paper took a strong stance against the First World War, publishing in December 1914 German Marxist politician Karl Liebknecht's argument that it was an imperialist war. It was an unpopular position in the war's beginning, causing the ELFS to lose members. The Woman's Dreadnought covered food shortages afflicting the country--briefly calling for a No Rent Strike--and squalid working conditions. The paper also welcomed the February Revolution in Russia, largely on the basis that it would establish a Constituent Assembly elected by universal suffrage and withdraw Russia from the war. As the months went by, the ELFS (now the Workers' Suffrage Federation) noted in Workers' Dreadnought that a situation of dual power had broken out between the Petrograd Soviet and the Russian Provisional Government, and upon analyzing the attitudes of the various socialist faction, decided to align with the Bolsheviks.

Pankhurst was arrested and jailed multiple times (but always went on a hunger strike and was released under the so-called Cat and Mouse Act) to serve out time for her speech in Trafalgar Square, free speech being denied by the government at the time. During such times suffragette, photographer and socialist activist Norah Smyth who had co-founded and funded the paper alternated as acting editor of The Woman's Dreadnought with Jack O'Sullivan. Smyth, from a wealthy family, was a member of the WSPU, working as an unpaid chauffeur for Emmeline Pankhurst, and doing various other tasks for at the group's headquarters. However, as her greatest interest was in promoting the cause of working women, she joined Sylvia Pankhurst's ELFS. For many years, Smyth had used her skills as a photographer to provide pictures for the newspaper of East End life, particularly of women and children living in poverty.

=== As Workers' Dreadnought ===
As public opinion turned against the war, the ELFS gained new support, and its newspaper increased its circulation. To reflect its now broader political positions, in March 1916 it renamed itself the Workers' Suffrage Federation (WSF). Similarly, on 28 July 1917, the name was changed to Workers' Dreadnought, Its slogan changed to "Socialism, Internationalism, Votes for All", and its first issue for October 1917 advocated for a peace referendum among the British Army. Before it could enter circulation, however, the Metropolitan Police raided offices of Workers Dreadnought and destroyed the copies of the issue.

The Workers' Dreadnought, then enthusiastically supported the October Revolution of 1917, which acted as a catalyst that changed their position from supporting universal suffrage towards anti-parliamentarism. When, in January 1918, the new Bolshevik government in Russia dissolved the Assembly, the paper welcomed its replacement by the All-Russian Congress of Soviets and now argued that Soviets were the most democratic form of government. As the paper for the WSF, it also looked forward to the Russian withdrawal from the war, welcoming the Treaty of Brest-Litovsk as a step towards peace. During this period, the WSF led campaigns against the Allied intervention in the Russian Civil War, with the slogan "Hands off Russia".

By 1918, Irish suffragette and communist May O'Callaghan was serving as the subeditor of the Workers' Dreadnought. The slogan of the paper, then with a circulation of 10,000, changed that July to "For International Socialism", reflecting increasing opposition to Parliamentarism in the party.

In May 1919, in an effort to stem efforts at intervention in the Soviet Union, the paper republished Lenin's "Appeal to the Toiling Masses." That year, Pankhurst met Italian anarchist and writer Silvio Corio and allowed him to oversee the newspaper's publication.

In 1920, Workers' Dreadnought ran Clara Zetkin's The Life and Times of Rosa Luxemburg dictated to Pankhurst personally on one of her tours of communist circles in Europe. On 19 June 1920, the paper was adopted as the official weekly organ of the Communist Party (British Section of the Third International).

I write because I feel that the ultimate result of your propaganda will be further strife and blood-spilling between whites and the many members of my race... who have been dumped down on the English docks since the ending of the European war... Bourbons of the United States will thank you, and the proletarian underworld of London will certainly gloat over the scoop of the Christian-Socialist pacifist Daily Herald.

— Claude McKay, "A Black Man Replies" in Workers' Dreadnought (24 April 1920)

During the postwar French occupation of the Rhineland, German communists attempted to retake the region. France employed the use of black colonial troops to halt them. Reporting on the events, the Daily Herald referred to the soldiers using terms such as "Black Scourge in Europe," and "Black Menace of 40,000 Troops". Jamaican writer Claude McKay considered the papers' focus on the Black soldiers to be illogical prejudice, and a distraction from the communists' efforts against French occupation. McKay wrote a letter addressed to the Daily Herald's editor George Lansbury expressing these concerns. Lansbury refused to print the response, while writing back privately claiming to not be personally prejudice against black people. Instead, he was encouraged by a friend to send it to Sylvia Pankhurst and have it printed in Workers' Dreadnought, and did so.

The paper warned of fascism in Italy, condemned the white labourism in South Africa's Rand Rebellion. It discoursed for the causes of Indian and Irish independence.

Sylvia Pankhurst was arrested under the Defence of the Realm Act for publishing articles "calculated and likely to cause sedition among His Majesty's forces, in the Navy, and among the civilian population". Claude McKay had his rooms searched. He is likely to have been the author of "The Yellow Peril and the Dockers" attributed to "Leon Lopez", which was one of the articles cited by the government in its case against Workers' Dreadnought.

The paper was heavily in debt by January 1921 and relied on revolutionaries outside the country for funding. On 14 June 1924, Workers' Dreadnought ceased publication when Smythe, Pankhurst, and Corio moved to a cottage in Woodford Wells, just outside of London.

== Contributors ==
- Louise Bryant
- Herman Gorter
- Amy Hicks
- Alexandra Kollontai
- Vladimir Lenin
- Karl Liebknecht
- Rosa Luxemburg
- Muriel Matters, "London Parks as Welfare Centres"
- Claude McKay
- Sylvia Pankhurst
- Clara Zetkin
- Emile Zola

== See also ==
- Media in London
- List of left-wing publications in the United Kingdom
