= 1923 United Kingdom dock strike =

The 1923 United Kingdom dock strike commenced in June 1923 when over 50,000 dockers were unhappy with a proposed pay reduction from 8s to 5s 6d for a four-hour minimum employment period. Ernest Bevin, the general secretary of the recently founded Transport and General Workers' Union had signed an agreement accepting this new rate of pay.

The strike began in Hull but soon spread across the UK.

Thousands of dockers left the TGWU to join the Amalgamated Stevedores' Labour Protection League to form the National Amalgamated Stevedores, Lightermen, Watermen and Dockers.
