= Silvio Corio =

Italian anarchist (1875–1954)

- Born: 28 October 1875; Turin, Kingdom of Italy
- Died: 11 January 1954 (age 78); Woodford Green, London, United Kingdom
- Other names: Crastinus; Qualanque
- Movement: Anarchism in Italy
- Partner: Sylvia Pankhurst
- Children: Richard Pankhurst
- Parents: Eugenio Corio (father); Chiara Domenica (mother)

Silvio Celestino Corio (28 October 1875 – 11 January 1954), also called Crastinus, was an Italian anarchist who was active in London during the first half of the twentieth century.

Silvio was born in Turin, the son of Eugenio Corio and Chiara Domenica. Following some initial involvement with the Turin Socialist Club, he became active as an anarchist. He trained as a printer and typographer. He was conscripted in July 1897 and spent most of the next 18 months in a disciplinary battalion as a result of his political activity. However, in 1898, he fled to France in the face of the repression implemented by Prime Minister Luigi Pelloux.

He was in a long-term relationship with Sylvia Pankhurst and their son was the academic Richard Pankhurst.
