= Workers' Socialist Federation =

- Leader: Sylvia Pankhurst
- Founded: 1914
- Dissolved: 1924
- Split from: Women's Social and Political Union
- Preceded by: East London Federation of Suffragettes; Workers' Suffrage Federation
- Succeeded by: Communist Party (British Section of the Third International)
- Newspaper: Workers' Dreadnought
- Ideology: Left communism Revolutionary socialism Industrial unionism (later)
- Political position: Far-left
- International affiliation: Communist Workers International

The Workers' Socialist Federation was a socialist political party in the United Kingdom, led by Sylvia Pankhurst. Under many different names, it gradually broadened its politics from a focus on women's suffrage to eventually become a left communist grouping.

== East London Federation of the WSPU ==
It originated as the East London Federation of the Women's Social and Political Union (WSPU, better known as the Suffragettes). The East London Federation was founded by Dr Richard Pankhurst and his wife Emmeline Pankhurst in 1893, and differed from its parent organisation in being democratic and including men, such as George Lansbury.

By this point, Sylvia had many disagreements with the route the WSPU was taking. She wanted an explicitly socialist organisation tackling wider issues than women's suffrage, aligned with the Independent Labour Party, based among working class people in the East End of London. She also wanted to focus on collective workers' action, not individual attacks on property.

== East London Federation of Suffragettes ==
These and other differences, including personal ones, led to Sylvia's expulsion, along with the East London Federation, from the WSPU. In early 1914, they renamed themselves the East London Federation of Suffragettes (ELFS) and launched a newspaper, the Women's Dreadnought. Members included Aethel Tollemache.

At first, the group campaigned for universal suffrage and agitated among parliamentarians, with the assistance of Keir Hardie. But with the outbreak of World War I, they began also to attack participation in the war, supporting the positions of the Zimmerwald Conference. This view initially lost the group support, but they began work to ameliorate suffering in the East End.

The ELFS got a chain of cost price restaurants set up, and itself set up a toy factory, free clinic and Montessori nursery. They also agitated for widow's pensions and dependent's allowances. The suffragette, Elsie Lagsding, worked at the restaurant, which had a capacity for 30-40 people, and at the welfare centre on Railway Street, Poplar, throughout World War I and talks about this in an interview with the historian, Brian Harrison, conducted as part of the Suffrage Interviews project, titled Oral evidence on the suffragette and suffragist movements: the Brian Harrison interviews.

== Workers' Suffrage Federation ==
As public opinion turned against the war, the group gained new support, and its newspaper increased its circulation. To reflect its now broader political positions, in March 1916 it renamed itself the Workers' Suffrage Federation (WSF). Similarly, in July 1917, the newspaper was renamed the Workers' Dreadnought. From the start of 1917, it adopted a new aim: "to secure Human Suffrage, namely, a Vote, for every Woman and Man of full age, and to win Social and Economic Freedom for the People".

The WSF supported the 1916 Irish Rising and became a leading proponent of improved social welfare while continuing agitation for a universal franchise. As such, it opposed the Franchise Bill which ultimately gave women in Britain the vote in general elections as the restrictions on women voting were much stricter than those on men.

Despite its evolving position, during much of 1917, the party remained focused on campaigning for universal suffrage and an end to World War I. It welcomed the February Revolution in Russia, largely on the basis that it would establish a Constituent Assembly elected by universal suffrage and withdraw Russia from the war. As the months went by, the WSF noted in Workers' Dreadnought that a situation of dual power had broken out between the Petrograd Soviet and the Russian Provisional Government, and upon analyzing the attitudes of the various socialist faction, decided to align with the Bolsheviks.

The party then enthusiastically supported the October Revolution of 1917, which acted as a catalyst that changed their position from supporting universal suffrage towards anti-parliamentarism. When, in January 1918, the new Bolshevik government in Russia dissolved the Assembly, the group now welcomed its replacement by the All-Russian Congress of Soviets and now argued that Soviets were the most democratic form of government. The WSF also looked forward to the Russian withdrawal from the war, welcoming the Treaty of Brest-Litovsk as a step towards peace. During this period, the WSF led campaigns against the Allied intervention in the Russian Civil War, with the slogan "Hands off Russia". The WSF demanded that the British government negotiate peace with Soviet Russia, urged the labour movement to take action in support of the Soviet government, and eventually called on workers' to launch a general strike that would force an end to the intervention. In the April 1918 issue of Workers' Dreadnought, Pankhurst argued that the most effective way to aid the Soviet government in Russia would be to establish workers' councils in Britain, and later insisted that a world revolution would be needed to overthrow global capitalism in order for the Russian Revolution to survive.

== Workers' Socialist Federation ==
The WSF's support for the soviet system led them to doubt the possibility of establishing socialism through a parliamentary system, increasingly arguing that only the Soviets could form the "guiding and co-ordinating machinery" of the social revolution. In May 1918, the party's conference agreed to again rename the group, now as the Workers' Socialist Federation, reflecting its growing opposition to Parliamentarism. However, their views on parliamentarism remained in a state of transition, with substantial internal disagreement on the issue. As preparation for the 1918 United Kingdom general election was underway, the WSF stated that it would not stand candidates in the election, Pankhurst herself refusing to stand for the Sheffield Hallam constituency, but it remained willing to support other socialist candidates for Parliament. The group went on to support the Socialist Labour Party's (SLP) three candidates in the election, along with independent socialists David Kirkwood and John Maclean, and permitted individual members to campaign for Labour Party candidates.

By March 1919, the WSF had moved to a hardline anti-parliamentary position, with Pankhurst arguing socialists needed to choose between "perpetuating the Parliamentary system" or building up "an industrial republic on Soviet lines." At the party's conference in June 1919, it voted to ignore all future elections, and also to follow the advice of the Third International by opening discussions with other socialist groups with the aim of forming a single communist party. As a result, it organised meetings in London later in the month, which were attended both by anti-parliamentarists such as the WSF and South Wales Socialist Society (SWSS), as well as by supporters of "Revolutionary Parliamentarism", including the SLP and British Socialist Party (BSP). Pankhurst wrote to Vladimir Lenin in July 1919, asking for his support for the party's opposition to standing in elections; but to her disappointment, he argued that renouncing parliamentary action would be a mistake. While not changing its views, the WSF accordingly deprioritised this policy in the hope of furthering the unity negotiations, a decision criticised by Rose Witcop of the Communist League.

It also began working with the London Workers' Committee.

Alongside the question of parliamentary action, the issue of affiliation to the Labour Party provided another roadblock to the unity negotiations. In March 1920, the WSF's executive committee declared that "if the BSP refuses to withdraw from the Labour Party, we get on with [the] formation of [a] Communist Party." By June 1920, it had become apparent that the unity negotiations would not satisfy all the participants, as they were unable to agree either on the issues of parliamentary action or whether the new communist party should attempt to affiliate to the Labour Party. In an attempt to get ahead of the Communist Unity Convention, which they believed would be dominated by those on the "right-wing" that favored parliamentarism and affiliation, the WSF instead called an "Emergency Conference", inviting all the "left-wing communists" which opposed parliamentarism and affiliation.

== Communist Party (British Section of the Third International) ==
The conference was held in June 1920 but was attended only by WSF members, some local groups and independents. It agreed to form the Communist Party (British Section of the Third International) (CP(BSTI)) and voted to boycott future unity meetings. Instead, it attempted to interest the SLP in a merger. They proposed opening discussions with the Socialist Party of Great Britain and the British Section of the International Socialist Labour Party, but then withdrew, leaving the exercise a failure. However, the CP(BSTI) did gain influence in the Scottish Communist Labour Party and the tiny Communist Party of South Wales and the West of England was formed on their platform.

The BSP had meanwhile formed the Communist Party of Great Britain (CPGB). Lenin called on other communists to join the new party, and the CP(BSTI) was one of the groups covered in his work Left-Wing Communism: An Infantile Disorder. Although Workers Dreadnought was openly critical of this pamphlet, Pankhurst attended the Second Congress of the Comintern, where Lenin personally persuaded Sylvia that her objections were less important than unity, and that it would be possible to maintain an anti-Parliamentary opposition within the CPGB. Pankhurst called a conference, inviting the English Shop Stewards' and Workers' Committee Movement, the Communist Labour Party, the Scottish Workers' Committee and the Glasgow Communist Group. She was arrested in September, but with the support of Willie Gallacher, all the groups at the conference bar Guy Aldred's Glasgow Communist Group agreed to merge with the Communist Party of Great Britain in January 1921.

After a period, Pankhurst was instructed to place the Workers' Dreadnought under the control of the party, which she refused to do. In particular, she criticised the Communist Party members of the Poplar Board of Guardians for agreeing to reduce outdoor Poor Law relief, which was cited as the reason for her expulsion from the CPGB in September 1921. While the idea of democratic centralism, newly accepted as the governing principle for the CPGB, would seem to suggest that she was in breach of discipline, Labour Monthly continued as the personal organ of R. P. Dutt and even received subsidies.

== Communist Workers' Party ==
Pankhurst reorganised her group of supporters around Workers Dreadnought, and began criticising the admittance of trade unions to the Red International of Labour Unions, and warning that they felt the Bolsheviks were beginning to "slip to the right". The decline in class conflict that culminated in the dissolution of the Shop Stewards Movement had reignited debates over trade unionism within the British socialist movement, which split into two camps: the "Amalgamationists" that advocated the amalgamation of existing trade unions into industrial unions and "Dual Unionists" that advocated for building new industrial unions from scratch. Where trade unionists aligned with the CPGB largely pursued amalgamation, the Dreadnought group had moved away from that position towards dual unionism, with Pankhurst writing in an August 1921 article that workers needed to unite into One Big Union capable of abolishing capitalism. Pankhurst criticised the attempts to reform existing trade unions from within, drawing parallels between the amalgamationists' tactic of trying to change union leadership from within and earlier socialist experiences with electoralism, arguing that institutional trade unionism needed to be abolished entirely and replaced with industrial unionism.

The Dreadnought group advocated grouping together Industrial Unions under the auspices of the "All-Workers Revolutionary Union": intended as "One Big Union" which would unite all workers in a struggle against capitalism. In February 1922, the Dreadnought group established the Communist Workers' Party (CWP), with this newly adopted industrial unionist policy as its foundation. In the party's programme, it stated its aim as such:

To prepare for the proletarian revolution, by setting up Soviets or workers' councils in all branches of production, distribution and administration, in order that the workers may seize and maintain control.
With this object, to organise One Revolutionary Union:
(a) built up on the workshop basis, covering all workers, regardless of sex, craft, or grade, who pledge themselves to work for the overthrow of Capitalism and the establishment of the workers' Soviets;
(b) organised into a department for each industry or service;
(c) the unemployed being organised as a department of the One Revolutionary Union, so that they may have local and national representation in the workers' Soviets.

The CWP had been influenced by the formation of the General Workers' Union of Germany (AAUD) by the Communist Workers' Party of Germany (KAPD) during the German Revolution. They intended as such to establish a British counterpart to the AAUD, just as the CWP was intended as the British counterpart to the KAPD. Taking the AAUd's programme as a basis, in September 1922 the CWP established the All-Workers' Revolutionary Union (AWRU) in order to implement its revolutionary unionist goals, envisioning the AWRU as the One Big Union that would itself manage the transition to socialism. The union organized itself along industrial unionist lines, where recallable delegates were elected by workshops, factories, districts, areas and national councils from the bottom-up. The CWP was quickly rendered redundant and was subsequently superseded by the AWRU, as the AWRU adopted the CWP's entire programme as its own and developed it into an even more comprehensive one than the CWP's, with membership of the AWRU being accepted only on the condition of adhering to all six points of the CWP platform:

1. to spread communist ideas;
2. electoral abstention and anti-parliamentary propaganda;
3. refusal of affiliation to the Labour Party or any other reformist organisation;
4. to emancipate workers from the existing trade unions;
5. to organise 'One Revolutionary Union' as the forerunner of the workers' councils;
6. and affiliation to the Communist Workers International (KAI).

The foundation of the AWRU was grounded in the CWP's prefigurative politics, as the AWRU was intended to itself organise the workers' councils which would then seize the means of production and form the basis of a council communist society, with the CWP even claiming in 1923 that "Communism and the All-Workers' Revolutionary Union are synonymous." This model stood in contrast to how the Soviets of the Russian Revolution and the workers' councils of the German Revolution had formed, largely spontaneously without their development by pre-existing organisations, but in Britain this kind of organising was no longer possible since the decline of the strike movement. However the model of dual unionism never bore fruit in Britain either, as its material circumstances were far different from that of the United States, where the Industrial Workers of the World (IWW) had seen success. The lack of reception to dual unionism meant that the organisation of the AWRU existed largely within the CWP's literature in Workers' Dreadnought. When the AWRU announced its campaign to build the "One Big Union" in July 1923, they also admitted that they had no funds and very few people. Despite optimism concerning a rise in revolutionary sentiment, by the end of 1923 the AWRU had dissolved.

Despite the failure of the AWRU, by July 1923 the CWP had announced the formation of the Unemployed Workers' Organisation (UWO), modelled closely on the IWW as an alternative to the CPGB's "reformist" National Unemployed Workers' Movement (NUWM). Initially, this attracted numerous former members of the NUWM, sometimes even whole branches throughout London. By the start of 1924, it claimed 3,000 members, mostly in London but also with a branch in Leeds. The organisation grew rapidly, which ended up becoming counterintuitive to the UWO's aims of organising an "army of production", given its members were made up of the unemployed.

In the end, no national group was formally constituted, and they later referred to their network as the Communist Workers Group, although it was by that point a very small party. On 14 June 1924, Workers' Dreadnought ceased publication, bringing a definitive end to the CWP.

== Honorary Treasurers ==
1913: Sybil Smith
1913: Sybil Thomas
1914: Evelina Haverfield
1915: Edgar Lansbury
1916: Norah Smyth
