= Communist Party (British Section of the Third International) =

British political party

- Leader: Sylvia Pankhurst
- Secretary: E. T. Whitehead
- Treasurer: T. J. Watkins
- Founded: June 19, 1920
- Dissolved: January 1921
- Merger of: Workers Socialist Federation; Labour Abstentionist Party; Various socialist and communist groups
- Merged into: Communist Party of Great Britain
- Succeeded by: Communist Workers' Party
- Newspaper: Workers' Dreadnought
- Membership (1920): 600
- Ideology: Left communism
- Political position: Far-left
- International affiliation: Communist International

The Communist Party (British Section of the Third International) was a Left Communist organisation established at an emergency conference held on 19–20 June 1920 at the International Socialist Club in London. It comprised about 600 people.

== History ==
The emergency conference was called in preparation for the Communist Unity Convention scheduled for 1 August 1920 in London. Here binding decisions were to be made by majority vote, and the Left Communists wanted to organise themselves against the right at this conference. The initial call was sent out by the Workers Socialist Federation (WSF) and attracted communist groups from Aberdeen, Croydon and Holt, the Gorton Socialist Society, the Manchester Soviet, the Stepney Communist League and the Labour Abstentionist Party. E. T. Whitehead, of the Labour Abstentionist Party, became the secretary, and T. J. Watkins was elected as treasurer. Workers' Dreadnought, the WSF newspaper edited by Sylvia Pankhurst, was adopted as the official weekly organ of the party, and a provisional Organising Council of 25 members was elected to manage the affairs of the organisation pending a National Conference scheduled for September 1920.

Despite Whitehead's assurances that the CP (BSTI) was against parliamentary action and would only consider running candidates for elections on a platform of abstentionism, a dispute broke out with Guy Aldred and the Glasgow Communist Group, who had suspended their support for the Third International on account of their avowed revolutionary parliamentarianism. The question of affiliation with the Labour Party also became an issue, as the CP (BSTI) had proclaimed non-affiliation to be a "cardinal principles", with articles in Workers' Dreadnought arguing against affiliation on a number of different points.

By the summer of 1920, the British communist press published translated extracts from Vladimir Lenin's new pamphlet Left-Wing Communism: An Infantile Disorder, which attacked British anti-parliamentarists and obliged participation in parliament as the basis for communist unity in the country. Lenin also wrote to the Communist Unity Convention urging the adoption of "revolutionary parliamentarism" as a tactic, something which was agreed by 189 votes to 19, becoming a founding principle of the Communist Party of Great Britain (CPGB). The CP (BSTI) had also urged the Convention to reject affiliation to the Labour Party in an open letter, but Lenin's criticisms of them and advocacy of affiliation led the Convention to agree to affiliation, albeit at a slim margin: 100 votes in favour, 85 against and 20 abstentions. But this policy proved fruitless, as the Labour Party ended up rejecting the CPGB's request to affiliate with them on every attempt, which eased relations between the CPGB and CP (BSTI).

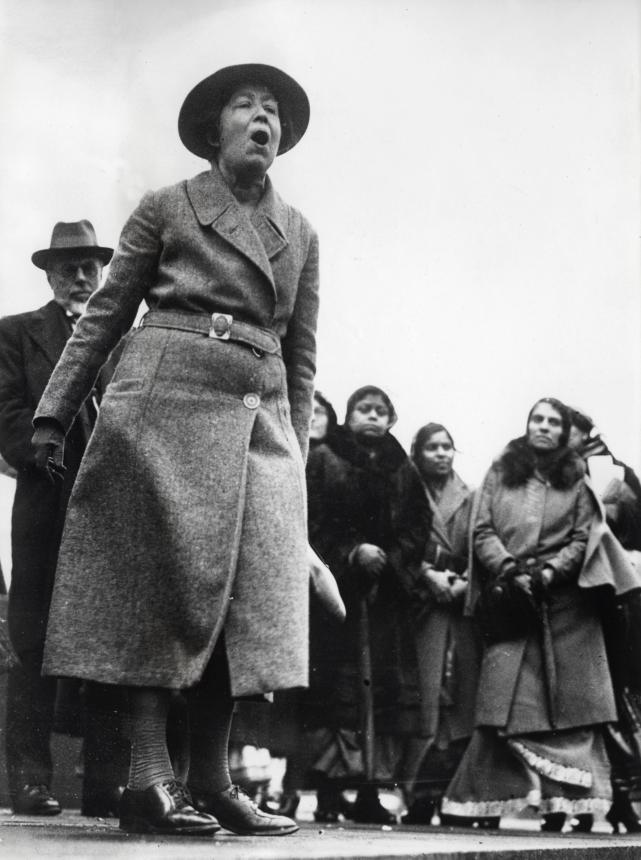
Sylvia Pankhurst, leader of the Communist Party (British Section of the Third International).

This differences in the policy of the CP (BSTI) and the International came to a head when the British section sent delegates to the International's Second World Congress. Delegates from the British Socialist Party (BSP) argued in favour of parliamentarism and affiliation to the Labour Party, securing Lenin's support and a resolution that adopted both as policy, despite the objections of Pankhurst. The CP (BSTI) were subsequently instructed to unite with the CPGB. Upon their return a further conference was held in Manchester on 18–19 September, where they voted to accept the conditions of the Second World Congress with explicit reservations about taking parliamentary action. Pankhurst argued that the tactic of revolutionary parliamentarianism would likely be dropped at the next congress, due to her impression of the size of the abstentionist faction at the second congress, also reporting that Lenin had said the issue was not important during an informal discussion.

At the third conference of the CP (BSTI) in Cardiff on 4 December, the Statutes and Theses of the Third International were accepted, although there was a consensus that they were not to be bound to parliamentary action. The four Manchester branches saw this as a "sell out", and resigned, taking 200 members with them. Whitehead and Pankhurst maintained they still had the freedom to fight for abstentionism within the CPGB, and they formally fused with them at the second Communist Unity Convention in Leeds, in January 1921. The Glasgow Communist Group responded by inaugurating their newspaper the Red Commune, declaring "there is no other party organ in this country [...] that stands fearlessly for Communism. They all urge or compromise with, in some shape or form, parliamentarianism". At Easter that year they established the Anti-Parliamentary Communist Federation.

Despite the merger, the former CP (BSTI) maintained Workers' Dreadnought as an independent publication from which they could criticise the CPGB on the issues of parliamentary action, as well as its attempted affiliation to the Labour Party. This proved ill-advised, as in September 1921, Sylvia Pankhurst and many of her associates were expelled from the CPGB for the criticisms published in the paper.

== Programme ==
In addition to anti-parliamentarism and opposition to affiliation with the Labour Party, the CP (BSTI) argued against establishment trade unions due to the professionalisation of union officials, which they argued put the officials in a privileged position. Despite this position, they argued in favour of CP (BSTI) members working within existing trade unions, in order to "stimulate the growth of rank and file organisation" and "undermine the influence of reactionary Trade Union leaders over the rank and file". In an internal circular, the party expressed a desire to recruit members from the trade unions so that it could extend its influence throughout them. It thus drew a distinction between working within "non-party mass organisations" and affiliation with "party organisations" such as the Labour Party, calling for the maximum possible participation of its members within trade union organisations, so long as it did not come into conflict with their "communist principles".

The CP (BSTI) also believed in the necessity of a transitional dictatorship of the proletariat, during which labour would be compulsory, a necessary means for individuals to secure basic necessities. During this transition, Pankhurst argued that wage labour would continue to exist, insisting that society would first need to implement a system of equal wages and equal rationing before abolishing wage labour altogether, though she was unclear on how long this would take or how the transition from the former to the latter would be accomplished. The CP (BSTI)'s programme further specified that commodity exchange would continue during this transitional period, albeit under state control, with "local and national Soviet banks" issuing currency.

== Bibliography ==
- Federation, Anarchist Communist (1996). "Anarchist Communism in Britain". Organise! (42). London: 11–18. OCLC 500079933. Archived from the original on 1 April 2006.
- Hayes, Mark (2005). The British Communist Left: a contribution to the history of the revolutionary movement 1914-1945. London: International Communist Current. ISBN 1897980116. OCLC 642281773.
- Jones, Rob (October 1991) [1989]. "Anti-Parliamentarism and Communism in Britain, 1917-1921". Discussion Bulletin. Grand Rapids, Michigan: Industrial Union Caucus in Education. OCLC 13302352.
- Shipway, Mark (1988). Anti Parliamentary Communism: the movement for workers' councils in Britain, 1917-45. London: Macmillan. ISBN 033343613X. OCLC 468642120.
