= Sylvia Pankhurst =

English activist, writer and artist (1882–1960)

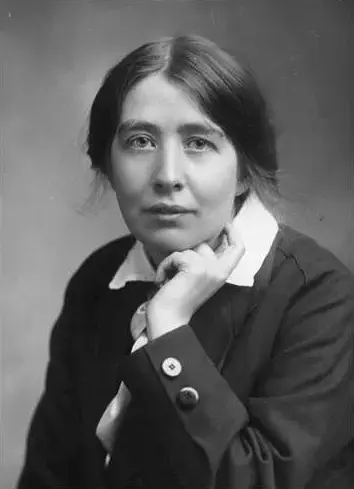
- Pankhurst in 1918
- Born: Estelle Sylvia Pankhurst; 5 May 1882; Old Trafford, Manchester, England
- Died: 27 September 1960 (aged 78); Addis Ababa, Ethiopian Empire
- Burial place: Holy Trinity Cathedral, Addis Ababa
- Education: Manchester School of Art; Royal College of Art
- Occupations: Activist, writer, artist
- Organisations: Women's Social and Political Union; East London Federation of Suffragettes; Women's International League for Peace and Freedom; World Committee Against War and Fascism
- Political party: Independent Labour Party; Workers' Socialist Federation; Communist Workers' Party; Communist Party of Great Britain
- Children: Richard Pankhurst
- Parents: Richard Pankhurst; Emmeline Goulden
- Relatives: Sophia Craine (maternal grandmother); Christabel Pankhurst (sister); Adela Pankhurst (sister); Helen Pankhurst (granddaughter); Alula Pankhurst (grandson)

Estelle Sylvia Pankhurst (/ˈpæŋkhərst/; 5 May 1882 – 27 September 1960) was an English feminist, socialist, activist, artist and writer. The youngest daughter of two founding members of the Independent Labour Party (ILP), she with her mother and sister Emmeline and Christabel Pankhurst formed the Women's Social and Political Union (WSPU) at their home. Following encounters with women-led labour activism in the United States, Sylvia worked to organise working-class women in London's East End. This, together with her refusal in 1914 to enter into a wartime political truce with the government, caused her to break with the suffragette leadership of her mother and sister. Pankhurst welcomed the Russian Revolution and conferred in Moscow with Lenin. But as an advocate of workers' control, she rejected the Leninist party line and criticised the Bolshevik regime.

Pankhurst was vocal in her support for Irish independence; for anti-colonial struggle throughout the British Empire; and for anti-fascist solidarity in Europe. Following its invasion by Italy in 1935, she was devoted to the cause of Ethiopia where, after the Second World War, she spent her remaining years as a guest of the restored emperor Haile Selassie. The international circulation of her pan-Africanist weekly The New Times and Ethiopia News was regarded by British colonial authorities as a factor in the development of African nationalism, and of the Rastafari movement in Jamaica.

== Early life ==
Estelle Sylvia Pankhurst (she later dropped her first forename) was born on 5 May 1882 at Drayton Terrace, Old Trafford, Manchester, to Emmeline Pankhurst (née Goulden) and Dr. Richard Pankhurst. Richard Pankhurst had been a founding member in 1872 of the National Society for Women's Suffrage, and played a role in drafting legislation that gave unmarried women householders a vote in local elections, and married women control over their property and earnings. According to his daughter, he was also distinguished by his support for Irish Home Rule, being "the first English Parliamentary candidate to pledge himself to Irish self-government when he stood at a by-election in Manchester in 1883".

The family home, for a period in Russell Square in London, hosted radical intelligentsia from both Britain and abroad. These included the Russian anarchist Peter Kropotkin, the Communard Louise Michel, and the Fabian Annie Besant. In 1893, Pankhurst's parents joined the Scottish miner Keir Hardie, a family friend, as founding members of the Independent Labour Party (ILP).

Pankhurst and her sisters, Christabel and Adela, attended Manchester High School for Girls. In 1903, Pankhurst went on to train as an artist at the Manchester School of Art. While completing an ILP commission to paint murals in a social hall the party had built in Salford, Pankhurst discovered that the hall, named after her father, would not admit women. It was an episode that helped convince her elder sister, Christabel, of the need for women to organise independently.

In 1904, Pankhurst won a scholarship to the Royal College of Art (RCA) in London, but she was incensed to learn that of 16 scholarships awarded by the college each year, 13 were reserved for men, and that, in response to a parliamentary question, Keir Hardie should be told that the authorities "did not contemplate any change".

== Suffragette ==
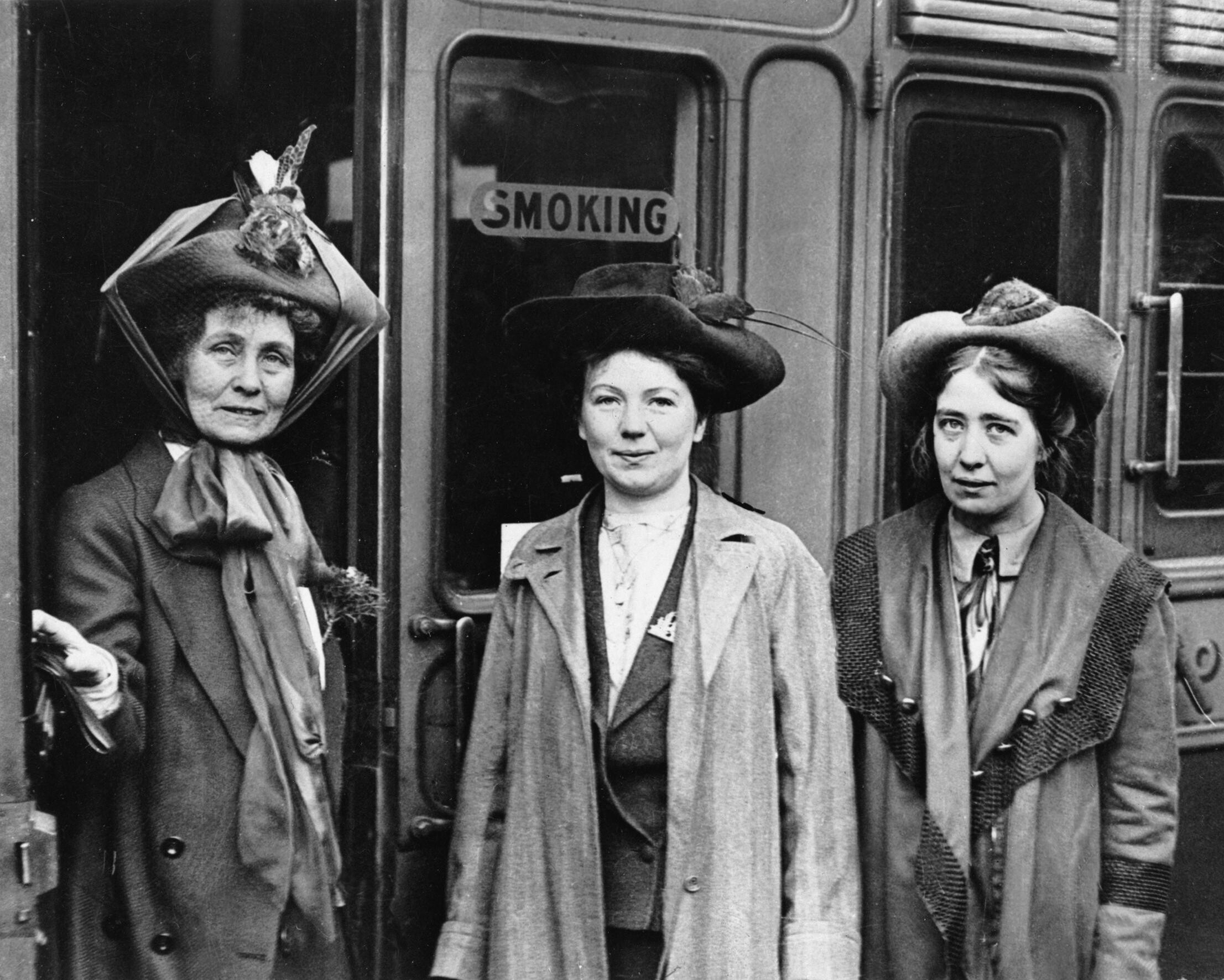
Pankhurst (right) with her mother Emmeline Pankhurst (left) and sister Christabel Pankhurst (centre) in 1911

The Women's Social and Political Union (WSPU) was founded as an independent women's movement on 10 October 1903 in the family's Nelson Street home in Manchester. Pankhurst's sister Christabel had persuaded a group of ILP women that women had to do the work of emancipation themselves, and that they needed a movement free of party affiliation.

In 1906, Sylvia Pankhurst started to work full-time for WSPU, with Christabel and their mother. She devised the WSPU logo and various leaflets, banners, and posters as well as the decoration of its meeting halls.

In 1907 she toured industrial towns in England and Scotland, painting portraits of working-class women in their working environments. She was later to write that she witnessed "so much distress", that she felt unable to return to her "beloved profession". With Alice Hawkins and Mary Gawthorpe she became a full-time organiser, and helped establish the WSPU in Leicester.

Pankhurst contributed articles to the WSPU's newspaper, Votes for Women and, in 1911, she published a propagandist history of the WSPU's campaign, The Suffragette: The History of the Women's Militant Suffrage Movement. It included her witness account of Black Friday 18 November 1910, in which 300 women marched to the Houses of Parliament as part of their campaign to press for voting rights under the Conciliation Bill, and were met with violence, some of it sexual, from the Metropolitan Police and male bystanders.

In 1912, Pankhurst led a march on Mountjoy Prison in Dublin in solidarity with two English WPSU militants who had violently sought to disrupt the Prime Minister H. H. Asquith's visit to the Irish capital. They had thrown a hatchet, to which a suffrage message was attached, into the carriage in which he was travelling with MP John Redmond and had attempted to set fire to the theatre in which the Prime Minister was to speak.

Between February 1913 and August 1914, Sylvia was arrested eight times for protest actions in London. After the passing of the so-called Cat and Mouse Act, she would be released for short periods to recuperate from her hunger strikes. Supporters would carry her back to her home and offices in Old Ford Street, Bow, where, when the police came to re-arrest her, street battles would ensue.

Pankhurst on hunger strike carried by supporters, London, June 1914

In June 1914, supporters carried her to the entrance to the Strangers' Gallery of the House of Commons where she announced that she would continue her hunger strike until Asquith agreed to receive a deputation of East London women. Asquith met the deputation of six working mothers. After listening to them pay tribute to the work Pankhurst had done "in arousing the women of the East End to the importance of the vote in their daily lives", and describe their hardships, the Prime Minister reiterated the government's position: Votes for women would have to await a general democratic reform of the franchise. That did not occur until 1918, with votes extended to married, property owning women over thirty. Full voting equality took another ten years.

== Encounters women-led labour activism in the United States ==
Pankhurst undertook two speaking tours in the United States: in the first three months of 1911 and again at the beginning of 1912. Writing letters home, mostly to Keir Hardie, she described herself as having to persuade her largely middle-class hosts that sweated female labour and mother-child poverty were as much a feature of the New World as the Old. She related her experience of going into factories, workshops, workhouses and prisons, of observing the application of Taylorist principles (rendering workers "part of the machinery"), and of witnessing in the South the virtual criminalisation of African Americans.

In January 1911, she was in Chicago. A strike wave, which had begun in 1909 with "the uprising of the 20,000" mostly immigrant, Jewish women workers in the sweatshops of New York, had spread to the city's clothing workers. Union pickets had been beaten and arrested. Two had been shot dead. Pankhurst visited strikers in their police cells, and observed that their conditions were as bad anything suffragettes had been subject to in Britain.

That same month, in New York City where she addressed a rally in Carnegie Hall, Pankhurst met the pioneer socialist feminist Margaret Sanger, together with a twenty-year-old Elizabeth Gurley Flynn. A year later, Flynn was to be the "Bread and Roses" strategist for the Industrial Workers of the World in the Lawrence textile strike. Back in New York City at the beginning of 1912, Pankhurst observed in laundry workers the same ability to overcome through collective action the racial, ethnic and sexual divisions systematically exploited by employers.

In Chicago, Pankhurst had been in the company of Zelie Passavant Emerson. Emerson had come to the Women's Trade Union League from the settlement house movement. Pankhurst had encountered settlement houses in England: As a child she had visited the first of these, Ancoats Brotherhood in Manchester. But in their outreach to women as both domestic and wage workers, in America she saw a potentially potent form of women-led activism. Returning to London with Emerson, it was an example she sought to replicate in London's East End.

Before being followed back to England by Emerson, in April 1912 Pankhurst joined the funeral procession in New York City for the 146 garment workers killed in the Triangle Shirtwaist Factory fire. Speaking beside labour organiser Rose Schneiderman, she said that their deaths were the result of working-class people being denied the right to represent themselves.

== East London socialist ==
In a first show of independence, and with the support of Keir Hardie, Julia Scurr, Eveline Haverfield, Nellie Cressall, and George Lansbury, Pankhurst renamed the East London Federation of the WPSU, the East London Federation of Suffragettes. Although it was to remain a women's—and women-led—emancipatory movement, it was opened to trade unionists and to men.

Pankhurst noted that "the East End was the greatest homogeneous working-class area accessible to the House of Commons by popular demonstrations" and proposed that the "creation of a woman's movement in that great abyss of poverty would be a call and a rallying cry to the rise of similar movements in all parts of the country". In this spirit, in November 1913, Pankhurst spoke at the Albert Hall, alongside James Connolly, in support of the men and women of the Irish Transport and General Workers' Union locked-out by Dublin employers.

In January 1914, accompanied by Nora Smyth, Pankhurst visited her sister Christabel in Paris, where she was taking refuge from the Cat and Mouse Act, to discuss the future of the ELFS. Christabel was insistent upon an independent, women-only WPSU, and was incredulous at her sister's unwillingness to attack socialists unpledged to women's suffrage. Pankhurst was equally insistent on supporting popular and labour struggles, and critical of what she considered to the WPSU's social elitism. The sisters agreed that they and their organisations should go their separate ways.

From the East London Federation of Suffragettes, in 1914 Pankhurst formed the Workers' Suffrage Federation. At the suggestion of Emerson, Pankhurst started a WSF paper. Provisionally titled Workers' Mate, the newspaper first appeared as The Woman's Dreadnought. Nora Smyth (who helped pay the bills) and Mary Phillips were the principal contributors, with Smyth illustrating the paper with her photographs of domestic East End poverty.

In the first edition of the paper (8 March 1914), Pankhurst's editorial defended their insistence on building a working-class suffragette campaign:

Those Suffragists who say that it is the duty of the richer and more fortunate women to win the Vote, and that their poorer sisters need not feel themselves called upon to aid in the struggle appear, in using such arguments, to forget that it is the Vote for which we are fighting. The essential principle of the vote is that each one of us shall have a share of power to help himself or herself and us all. It is in direct opposition to the idea that some few, who are more favoured, shall help and teach and patronize the others.

This "struck a strong chord with many women socialists of an earlier generation who had serious reservations about the WSPU". Amy Hicks, a veteran of the Social Democratic Federation, supported the ELFS from its start; as did Dora Montefiore who had left the WSPU in 1906, and had also spoken on behalf of the Dublin workers at the Albert Hall. The ELFS supported labour struggles and organised rent strikes.

== War-time organiser and dissident ==
WSF toy factory, London East End, 1915

The United Kingdom's declaration of war upon Germany on 4 August 1914 found Pankhurst in Dublin investigating the Bachelor's Walk massacre. After allowing the initial popular enthusiasm for the war to pass, Pankhurst (who on 8 August decried the "heedless" rush to war of "men-made governments") and the WSF campaigned against conscription and in solidarity with conscientious objectors. These were positions for which she was attacked in the WSPU newspaper, patriotically renamed Britannia.

Pankhurst retained the confidence of some WSPU veterans. She was invited by Elizabeth McCracken to Belfast, where Christabel's wartime directive had put a halt to a particularly militant campaign, to speak in support of equal pay for women doing war work. It was a demand Pankhurst championed along with universal food rationing, debt relief and improved allowances for soldiers wives. By helping to shift some the costs of the war off the back of women and poor, she believed that these were measures that might hasten its end.

At the same time, in the East End docks community, the ELFS/WSF sought to offer women practical assistance. They organised "cost-price" canteens, employment in a toy-making cooperative (whose product was in high demand in West-End shops), and (in what had been a pub renamed from the Gunmakers' Arms to the Mothers' Arms) childcare offered on Montessori principles, a home visiting centre, and free medical care and advice. Not wishing to be diverted by actions that might be interpreted as charity (and for which wealthy patrons had to be solicited), Pankhurst had misgivings. She feared that "organised relief, even the kindliest and most understanding, might introduce some savour of patronage or condescension, and mar our affectionate comradeship, in which we were all equals". Mitigation was sought in a policy of paying women not less than the minimum wage paid to men in the area and by creating the separate League of Rights for Soldiers' and Sailors' Wives and Relatives, in which women who wished to challenge government benefit decisions were encouraged to act collectively. Pankhurst later wrote:

It was my great joy that we were stimulating working women to speak up for themselves and their sort, and to master, despite their busy lives, the intricacies of Royal warrants and Army regulations, so as to secure the promised allowances, such as they were, for themselves and their neighbours.

In 1915, Pankhurst supported the International Women's Peace Congress, held at The Hague. Her sister Christabel, meanwhile, seconded British diplomatic efforts, travelling to Russia after the February 1917 Revolution to rally support for the country's continued participation in the war.

The 28 July 1917 edition of her paper appeared under a new title Worker's Dreadnought—WSF members "realised that solidarity between men and women was essential if they were going to win their fight"— and with a new strap-line, "Socialism. Internationalism, Votes for All". It printed, three days in advance of The Times, Siegfried Sassoon's "wilful defiance of military authority": his statement that having become "a War of aggression and conquest", the conflict was being "deliberately prolonged by those who have the power to end it". It led to a police raid on the paper's offices. The issue of 6 October 1917 advocating a peace referendum among the troops, was destroyed and the type broken up.

In May 1918, the WSF, in line with the paper, was renamed the Workers' Socialist Federation. Reflecting her growing belief, in the wake of the October Revolution in Russia, that only Soviets could form the "guiding and co-ordinating machinery" for a socialist transformation, Pankhurst refused an invitation to stand for the Sheffield Hallam constituency in the December 1918 "Coupon election". The WSF did go on to support other socialist candidates, but claimed to do so merely to "make propaganda for the overthrow of Parliament. ... Under the Soviet system those who make the laws are delegates chosen from amongst the workers themselves."

== Revolutionary ==
=== Left communist ===
By March 1919, Pankhurst was insisting that the choice was clear: socialists had to build "an industrial republic on Soviet lines", and abandon the Parliamentary system. Lenin, who in his 1920 thesis Left-Wing Communism: An Infantile Disorder profiled the WSF, advised Pankhurst that, tactically, the blanket rejection of parliamentarianism is a "mistake".

In June 1920, the WSF co-hosted the inaugural meeting conference of the Communist Party (BSTI). In preparation for the meeting, Pankhurst published a manifesto in the Workers' Dreadnought. Rather than the developing Leninist model of the party-state and centrally planned economy, it embraced ideas closer to the councilism of the Dutch revolutionary Marxist Antonie Pannekoek and to the anarcho-syndicalism of her partner Silvio Corio. Her contribution was to highlight the potential for extending their models of collective decision-making from the workplace into the domestic sphere. What she called Household Soviets would ensure that "mothers and those who are organisers of the family life of the community" are "adequately represented, and may take their due part in the management of society"

In any event, it was the Communist Party of Great Britain (CPGB), formed by the British Socialist Party in August 1920 (with Montefiore on its provisional council), that gained Moscow's approval. In July, after a six-month tour through revolutionary Europe , stopping in Bologna, Italy expressly to observe a soviet in action, Pankhurst had smuggled herself into Soviet Russia to attend the Second Congress of the Comintern. There Lenin personally persuaded her that her objections were less important than unity, and that it would be possible for her to maintain a platform within the CPGB.

On her return, Pankhurst was sufficiently enthused to offer a paean to the new Soviet society:

From Russia ... I brought away with me a prevailing memory of beautiful, well-grown children and healthy people. It appears that a happy contentment and buoyant, confident enthusiasm is radiating from the active makers of the revolution and builders of the proletarian state, to wider and wider sections of people...

In September, with Willie Gallacher Pankhurst called a conference, inviting representatives of the Shop Stewards Movement, the CPGB, the Scottish Worker's Committee and the Glasgow Communist Group. All the groups at the conference bar Guy Aldred's Glasgow Communist Group agreed to merge with the Communist Party of Great Britain in January 1921.

In the interim, in October 1920, she had been arrested in the offices of the Dreadnought and sentenced to six months for calling on dockers not to load arms for shipment to the anti-Bolshevik forces in Russia. Pankhurst said she considered a hunger strike but was afraid the weapon was no longer available as the government had just allowed Terence MacSwiney, Sinn Féin mayor of Cork, to die in Brixton Prison.

While in Holloway, Pankhurst wrote poems published in 1922 as Writ on Cold Slate. "Above all" they are the stories of her cellmates – "the young and the old, the homeless and the hungry, mothers, pregnant women and babies born in captivity – 'dregs from the ancient system's wheel of waste'".

=== Break with Moscow ===
In September 1921, arguing that there had to be "free expression and circulation of opinion within the Party" and "an independent Communist voice, free to express its mind unhampered by Party discipline", Pankhurst refused to hand over control of the Workers Dreadnought to the CPGB, and was expelled.

In an "Open Letter to Lenin" in November, Pankhurst warned that the Bolsheviks had begun to "desert communism" and, by default, were opening Europe to path taken in Italy by the Fascisti. She had serialised Rosa Luxemburg's 1918 critique of Bolshevik policy, and had herself repeated Luxemburg's charge that in sanctioning the division of the land into small peasant holdings, the Bolsheviks had betrayed the revolution. She had also opened the Dreadnought to Alexandra Kollontai's "The Workers' Opposition", a critique of the developing Soviet bureaucracy, and to appeals from anarchists in Bolshevik prisons.

By July 1923, Pankhurst concluded that "the term 'dictatorship of the proletariat' has been used to justify the dictatorship of a party clique of officials over their own party members and over the people at large". Socialism, as interpreted by the Bolsheviks, had been stripped of its emancipatory promise. In one of her last contributions to Dreadnought on the subject of Soviet regime she wrote:

The Bolsheviks pose now as the prophets of centralised efficiency, trustification, State control and the discipline of the proletariat in the name of increased production ... Russian workers remain wage slaves, and very poor ones, working, not from free will, but under compulsion of economic need, and kept in their subordinate position by ... State coercion.

Stirred by the example in Germany of the General Workers' Union (AAUD), and on the principle, advanced by Antonie Pannekoek, that Communism can be achieved only by workers "acting where they stand in the process of production", the Dreadnought group called for an "All-Workers Revolutionary Union" (AWRU). This was to organise on industrial unionist lines, with recallable delegates elected, in rising succession, from workshops, factories, districts, and regions to national councils. With this One Big Union programme, in February 1922 they formed themselves as the Communist Workers' Party (CWP).

When in July 1923 the CWP announced its campaign to build the AWRU, it was with the admission that they had no funds and very few people. It had managed to established just three branches outside London, in Sheffield, Plymouth and Portsmouth. Despite optimism concerning a rise in revolutionary sentiment, by the end of 1923 the CWP had dissolved.

On 14 June 1924, Workers' Dreadnought itself ceased publication. This was not before raising the alarm at the triumph fascism in Italy, condemning the then-Communist condoned white labourism in South Africa's Rand Rebellion, and employing its first black correspondent, the Jamaican writer Claude McKay. With McKay, Pankhurst shared outrage at the Daily Herald's campaign against the French employment of black colonial troops in Germany.

In Australia, and after a militant career with the WSPU, Pankhurst's younger sister, Adela Walsh, appeared to have moved in similar direction. Having organised during the war for the Women's Peace Army, in 1920 she became a founding member of the Communist Party of Australia. But following her own disillusionment with Leninist party politics, she was to move to the far right, becoming a leading figure in the Australia First Movement.

== Writer ==
With her partner, the Italian libertarian socialist Silvio Erasmus Corio, Pankhurst retired to a cottage in then rural Woodford Green, Essex (now in the London Borough of Redbridge).

While Corio ran a tearoom, Pankhurst researched and wrote an eclectic series of books: an anti-colonial historical-cultural treatise. India and the Earthly Paradise (1926); a promotion of the international auxiliary language Latino sine flexione, Delphos, or the future of International Language (1928); Save the Mothers: A plea for measures to prevent the annual loss of about 3000 child-bearing mothers and 20,000 infant lives in England and Wales and a similar grievous wastage in other countries (1930); her largely autobiographical accounts, The Suffragette Movement (1931) and The Home Front (1932); and a biography of her mother, The Life of Emmeline Pankhurst (1935), who, since the birth of Pankhurst's son Richard in 1927, had broken off all contact.

== Anti-imperialism and anti-fascism ==
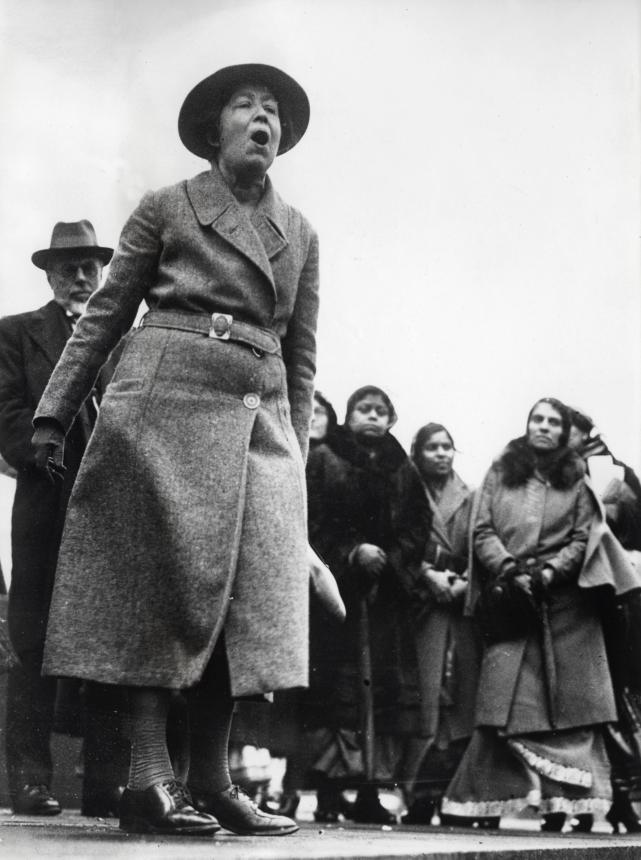
Pankhurst protesting in Trafalgar Square against British policies in India, 1932

While the Dreadnought did not take a consistent line on the 1916 Easter Rising in Dublin, an editorial written by Pankhurst on the event stated in part that: "Justice can make but one reply to the Irish rebellion and that is the demand that Ireland should be allowed to govern itself". She placed the rising in the context of the limitations of the Irish Home Rule movement, and argued that "[everybody] knows it was the Carsonites who first armed". She claimed that the rebels were animated by "high ideals", and stated that the Dreadnought "[understands] why rebellion breaks out in Ireland and we share the sorrow of those who are weeping today for the rebels whom the government has shot."

In commentary on the Irish War of Independence (1919–1921), the Dreadnought suggested that "with their industries being destroyed by English capitalists, and with their lives always in danger from the military . . . Irish men and women are compelled to become Communists in word and deed". The paper was open to assertions of James Connolly's daughter Nora that with "the awakening of a revolutionary spirit (caused by the insurrection of 1916) has come an intensive growth of revolutionary thought". In the event, Pankhurst was disappointed by the outcome: the Anglo-Irish Treaty of 1921 described in the Dreadnought as "a sad, humiliating compromise of the stand for a completely independent Irish Republic".

In India and the Earthly Paradise, published in Bombay in 1926, Pankhurst claimed that the social and family structures in ancient India resembled the essential features of communism: equality, fraternity and mutuality. She further argued in the work that these structures were corrupted and destroyed by priests, monarchies and successive wave of foreign invaders, citing the caste system in India to support her arguments. The work has been described as a "'romantic Communist' contribution to Indian nationalism" which may have been the "result of [Pankhurst's] contacts with fringe elements of that movement". Though she was unable to find a publisher for the work in Britain, Pankhurst continued to involve herself on Indian affairs. She participated in protests against the slow progress of the Indian Home Rule movement and criticised the Royal Air Force's use of aerial bombing during the Saya San Rebellion in Burma and Pink's War in the North-West Frontier. In 1935, Pankhurst commissioned the Anti–Air War Memorial in Woodford Green, London as "a protest against war in the air".

In 1934, the French feminist Gabrielle Duchêne organised the World Assembly of Women, and chaired its World Committee of Women against War and Fascism (CMF; Comité mondial des femmes contre la guerre et le fascisme). Pankhurst was among the non-Communist British sponsors of the Committee along with Charlotte Despard, Ellen Wilkinson, Vera Brittain and Storm Jameson, the Six Point Group and the National Union of Women Teachers. In 1935 the Committee pooled resources with the League against Imperialism and the West-African Union des Travailleurs Nègres (Union of Black Workers) to promote freedom of speech and to protest repression throughout the European colonial empires. The Women's World Committee was active in support of the International Committee for the Defence of the Ethiopian People, which held its first meeting on 2 September 1935 before the Italian invasion of Ethiopia was launched in October 1935.

Having already in her Open Letter to Lenin (1922) identified Fascism as a gathering threat in Europe, Pankhurst acted in support of Italian exiles (her partner Silvio Corio among them). She was a founding member of the anti-fascist Friends of Italian Freedom, the Italian Information Bureau and the Women's International Matteotti Committee. Later, in the 1930s, she became a vice-president of the League for the Boycott of Aggressor Nations and the Anti-Nazi Council which sought trade embargoes against Mussolini's Italy and Hitler's Germany. To George Bernard Shaw (who professed to be "unmoved" by the murder of Giacomo Matteotti) she wrote (9 July 1935):

You have said that "liberty, as understood by the upholders of capitalism, is a putrefying corpse". To a large extent you are right, for if people are slaves of economic stress, as so many are everywhere today, they often find themselves unable to exercise the liberty of standing up for their convictions as they would desire, but at least in the non-Fascist countries, most of us are able to do propaganda for our convictions, as you and I do.

Pankhurst wrote to Winston Churchill, her constituency MP, concurring with him on the need for a more resolute foreign policy, but was unable to persuade him of the need for immediate action against the Italian invasion of Ethiopia.

In 2004, the release of previously classified government files revealed that throughout the 1930s and 1940s MI5 had monitored Ms Pankhurst's movements and intercepted her letters and telephone calls.

== Involvement in Ethiopia ==
In 1940, as the Germans advanced through the Low Countries and into France, she wrote to Viscount Swinton, then chairing a committee investigating Fifth Columnists, and enclosed lists of active Fascists still at large and of anti-Fascists who had been interned. A copy of this letter on MI5's file carries a note in Swinton's hand reading: "I should think a most doubtful source of information." The authorities had taken an increasingly grim view of her anti-colonial agitation, heightened from 1935 as she became "the main protagonist of the 'print activism'" in the cause of Ethiopia.

In July 1935, representing the Women's Committee against War and Fascism, Pankhurst together with George Brown (League of Coloured Peoples), Reginald Reynolds (No More War Movement) and Reginald Bridgeman (League against Imperialism) had organised a public protest in support of Ethiopia at Essex Hall in London. After the Italian invasion commenced in October, she began publication of The New Times and Ethiopia News. As well as reporting Italian atrocities in Ethiopia (and from July 1936, Francoist atrocities in Spain), it provided an outlet for anti-colonialist writers elsewhere in Africa. Nancy Cunard, for whom it was no accident that the Spanish fascist rebellion first broke out in an African colony (Spanish Morocco), also wrote for the paper, as did Jawaharlal Nehru.

Pankhurst visited Ethiopia in 1944 after it had been liberated by Allied forces from Italian occupation, and criticised what she perceived as British ambitions to take over the region. In another visit which lasted from 1950 to 1951, she visited Eritrea, which was then under a British military administration. Pankhurst observed the administration's dismantlement of Italian-built port installations in Eritrea, which were sent to India and Kenya as war reparations, criticising the policy in a pamphlet titled Why are we destroying the Eritrean ports? In opposition to the British authorities, she supported Eritrea, Djibouti and Somaliland becoming part of Ethiopia. In 1947, a Foreign Office official commented that "we agree with you ... that this horrible old harridan should be choked to death with her own pamphlets".

The New Times and Ethiopia News remained in circulation for 20 years and at its height sold 40,000 copies weekly. This included an extensive circulation throughout West Africa and the West Indies. In 1956, the Governor of Jamaica, Sir Hugh Foot, was informed that Pankhurst's paper was radicalising a "sect" who called themselves the "Rastafari". At the same time, he was cautioned that she could be relied upon to "react violently to any suggestion that her paper should not be made available to all and sundry". In some Crown colonies, such as Sierra Leone from where the nationalist I. T. A. Wallace Johnson contributed pieces, the paper had, indeed, been banned.

=== Friendship with Haile Selassie ===
Pankhurst did have political contact with T. Ras Makonnen, the West Indian pan-Africanist (a Guyanese of Ethiopian descent), but there is no indication that she was engaged with the new spiritual movement in Jamaica. Such, nonetheless, was her seeming hagiography of Haile Selassie that she has since been proposed as the "first white Rastafarian".

Her biographer Patricia Romero suggests that Pankhurst was overwhelmed by Selassie so that "her republicanism departed from Waterloo station in June 1936, when the emperor's train rolled in" and she encountered him for the first time. Others explain the devotional relationship, at least in part, by reference to her strong anti-imperialist, anti-fascist and anti-racist sympathies: "Pankhurst loved to defend the underdog and she saw in Selassie much more a defeated victim of fascism than a reactionary monarch". According to her son, Richard, her mother did not hesitate to tell Haile Selassie that, as a life-long republican, she supported him only because of the cause he represented, and that while she was cautious about involving herself in Ethiopia's domestic politics, she did voice support for trade unions and for universal suffrage.

In 1956, encouraged by Haile Selassie to aid with women's development, Pankhurst and her son Richard moved into an imperial guest house in the Ethiopian capital to Addis Ababa (Corio had died in 1954). Richard's future wife, Rita, arrived some months later. Sylvia raised funds for Ethiopia's first teaching hospital, and wrote extensively on Ethiopian art and culture. She dedicated Ethiopia: A Cultural History (1955) to Haile Selassie: "Guardian of Education, Pioneer of Progress, Leader and Defender of his People in Peace and War".

== Death and commemoration ==
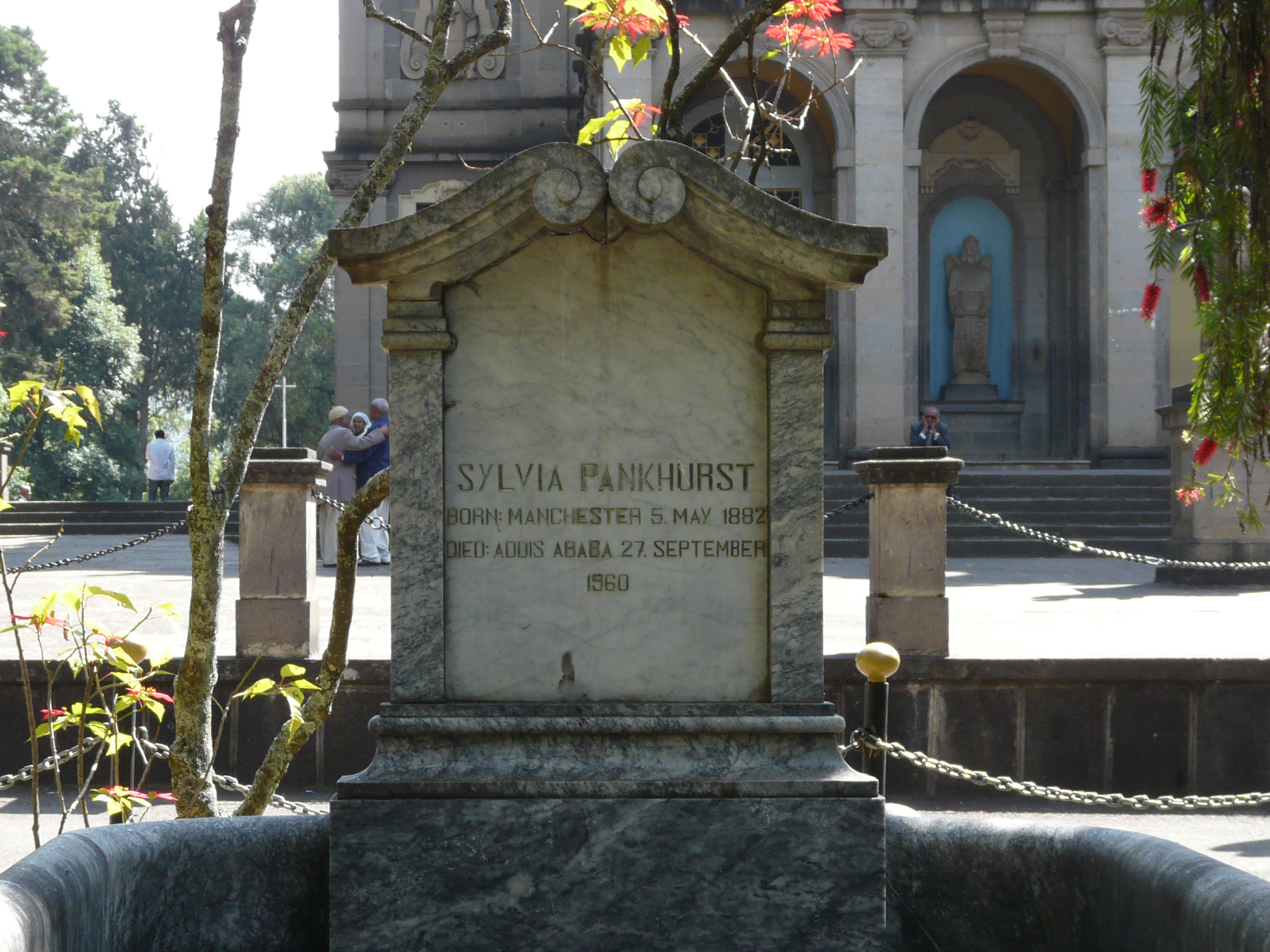
Pankhurst's grave

Pankhurst died in Addis Ababa, Ethiopia, in 1960, aged 78, and received a full state funeral at which Haile Selassie named her "an honorary Ethiopian". She is the only foreigner buried in front of Holy Trinity Cathedral in Addis Ababa, in a section reserved for patriots of the Italian war.

Pankhurst's name and picture (and those of 58 other women's suffrage supporters) are on the plinth of the statue of Millicent Fawcett in Parliament Square, Westminster, London. There is a two-dimensional silhouette constructed of Corten steel representing Pankhurst as a campaigning suffragette in Mile End Park, Bethnal Green, London. She is also the subject of a mural, completed 2018 by Jerome Davenport, on the gable end of the Lord Morpeth pub on Old Ford Road in Bow, London. It is next door to the house in which she lived between 1914 and 1924 while working with the ELFS and WSF.Angela Down portrayed her in the 1974 TV mini-series "Shoulder to Shoulder" and Alexandra Donnachie in the dramatised documentary "Suffragettes with Lucy Worsley" in 2018.

In October 2022, London's Old Vic Theatre announced for 25 January 2023 the world premiere of Sylvia, a hip-hop musical about Pankhurst. Directed and choreographed by Kate Prince, it seek to tell her story to "younger and more diverse audiences".

== Family ==
Pankhurst objected in principle to entering into a marriage and to taking a husband's name. Near the end of the First World War, she began living with Italian anarchist Silvio Corio and moved to Woodford Green, where she lived for over 30 years — a blue plaque and Pankhurst Green opposite London Underground's Woodford tube station commemorate her ties to the area. At Woodford Green in 1927, at the age of 45, she gave birth to a son, Richard. As she refused to marry the child's father, her mother broke ties with her and did not speak to her again. Richard became a leading student of Ethiopian history and the first director of the Institute of Ethiopian Studies at Addis Ababa University. His son (Pankhurst's grandson) Alula Pankhurst is an Ethiopian scholar and social development consultant in Addis Ababa, and has been a contributor to the Ethiopia Observer which continues to publish. His daughter (Pankhurst's granddaughter) Helen Pankhurst, is a British women's rights activist, scholar, writer and the convenor of Centenary Action, an organization dedicated to achieving a gender equal parliament in the UK.

== Artist ==
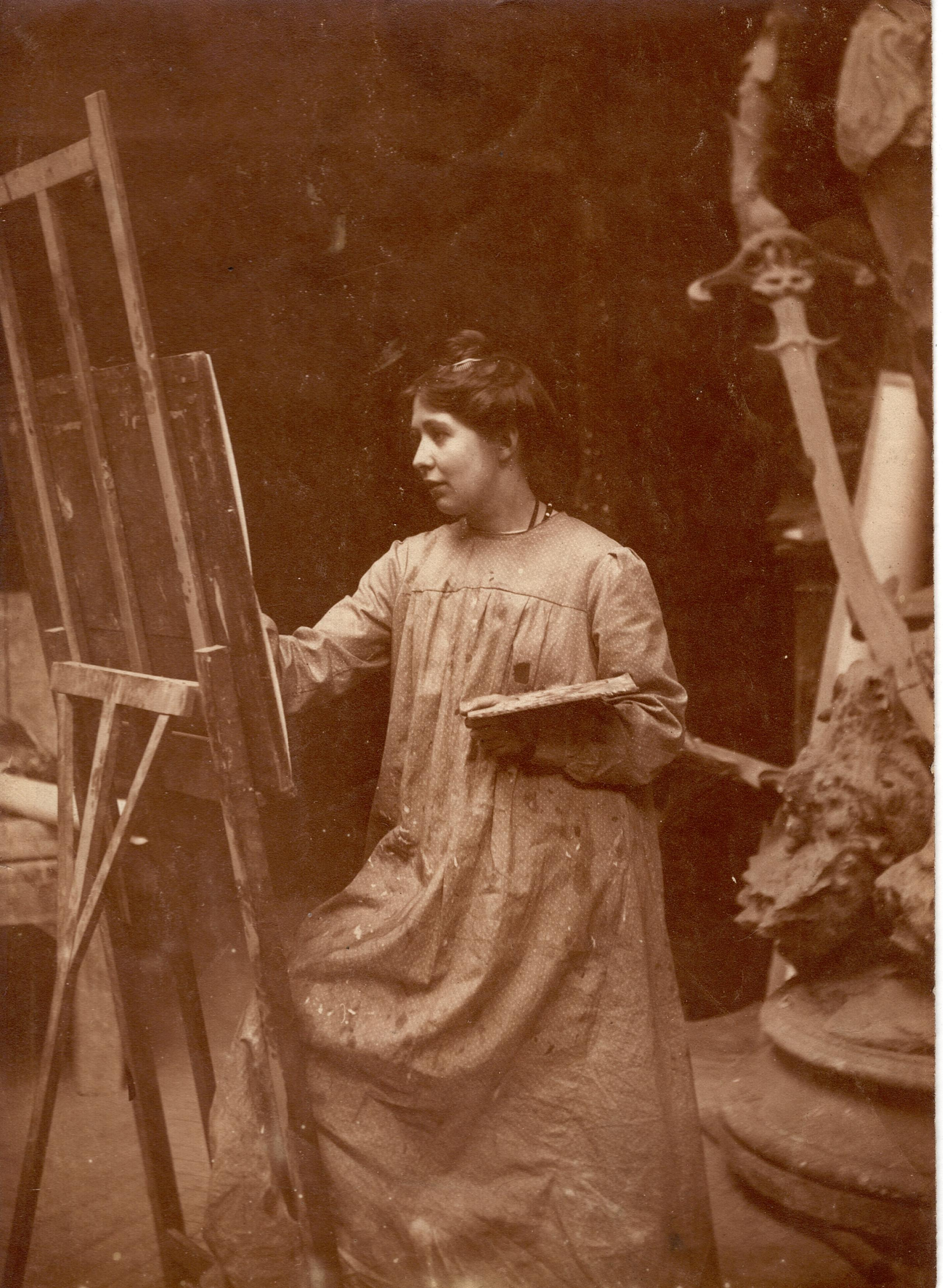
Sylvia Pankhurst in her studio

From an early age Pankhurst had an ambition to become a "painter and draughtsman in the service of the great movements for social betterment". She trained at Manchester School of Art (1900–1902) and then the Royal College of Art in London (1904–1906). As part of her work campaigning for the WSPU, for which she created designs for a range of banners, jewellery and graphic logos. Her motif of the 'angel of freedom', a trumpeting emblem had wider appeal across the campaign for women's suffrage, appearing on banners, political pamphlets, cups and saucers.

An exhibition of her artistic works took place at Tate Britain in 2013–14. Information about the exhibition, together with photographs of the artwork itself, is part of the Sheffield Hallam University Research Archive.

Pankhurst found it difficult to reconcile her artistic vocation with her political activities, eventually deciding that they were incompatible. She said: "Mothers came to me with their wasted little ones. I saw starvation look at me from patient eyes. I knew that I should never return to my art". By 1912, she had all but abandoned her artistic career to concentrate on her political activism.

== Writings (selection) ==
- 1911: The Suffragette: The History of the Women's Militant Suffrage Movement, London: Gay & Hancock
- 1913: "Forcibly Fed: The Story of My Four Weeks in Holloway Gaol", McClure's Magazine, August, pp. 87–92.
- 1918: Education of the Masses. London: Worker's Dreadnought Publications.
- 1920: "A constitution for British soviets. Points for a communist programme". Workers' Dreadnought, 19 June.
- 1921: "Soviet Russia as I saw it", Workers' Dreadnought, 16 April.
- 1921: Soviet Russia as I Saw It. London: Worker's Dreadnought Publications.
- 1922: Writ on Cold Slate. Prison Poems by Sylvia Pankhurst. London: Worker's Dreadnought Publications. Reissued 2021 by Smokestack Books.
- 1921: "Free discussion", Workers' Dreadnought, 17 September.
- 1921–1923: "Communism and its Tactics", Workers' Dreadnought (serialisation).
- 1922: "Open Letter to Lenin". Workers Dreadnought. 4 November.
- 1926: India and the Earthly Paradise. Bombay: Sunshine Publishing House.
- 1927: Delphos or the Future of International Language, London: Kegan Paul, Trench, Trubner & Co
- 1930: Save the Mothers: A plea for measures to prevent the annual loss of about 3000 child-bearing mothers and 20,000 infant lives in England and Wales. London: A. A. Knopf
- 1930: Poems of Mihai Eminescu, translated from the Rumanian and rendered into the original metre by E. Sylvia Pankhurst and I. O. Stefanovici. London: Kegan Paul, Trench, Trubner & co., Ltd.
- 1931: The Suffragette Movement: An Intimate Account of Persons and Ideals. Reissued 1984 by Chatto & Windus.
- 1932 The Home Front: A Mirror to Life in England During the First World War. Reissued 1987 by The Cresset Library.
- 1935: The Life of Emmeline Pankhurst. The suffragette struggle for women's citizenship, London: T. Werner Laurie
- 1951: Ex-Italian Somaliland. Digitised 2006 by the Philosophical Library.
- 1952: Eritrea on the Eve: The Past and Future of Italy's "First-Born" Colony, Ethiopia's Ancient Sea Province. Woodford Green: New Times and Ethiopia Books.
- 1953: with Richard Pankhurst, Ethiopia and Eritrea: The Last Phase of the Reunion Struggle 1941–52. Woodford Green: Lalibela House.
- 1955: Ethiopia: A Cultural History. Woodford Green: Lalibela House.
- 1987: E. Sylvia Pankhurst: Portrait of a Radical, London: Yale University Press.
- 1993: A Sylvia Pankhurst Reader, ed. by Kathryn Dodd, Manchester University Press.
- 2019: A Suffragette in America: Reflections on Prisoners, Pickets and Political Change, Ed. Katherine Connelly. London: Pluto Press.

== Newspapers and journals ==
- Woman's Dreadnought. 1914–1917.
- Workers' Dreadnought. 1917–1924.
- Germinal- 1923.
- The New Times and Ethiopia News. 1935–1956.
- Ethiopia Observer. 1956–1974.

== See also ==
- Anti-Air War Memorial
- History of feminism
- List of suffragists and suffragettes
- Pankhurst Centre in Manchester
- Sylvia Pankhurst (artwork)
- Women's suffrage in the United Kingdom
- Patricia Lynch
