= Mondo Macabro (TV programme) =

- Genre: Docuseries
- Written by: Pete Tombs; Andy Starke
- Directed by: Pete Tombs; Andy Starke
- Country of origin: United Kingdom
- No. of series: 1
- No. of episodes: 8

Production
- Producers: Pete Tombs; Andy Starke
- Editor: Andy Starke
- Running time: 25 minutes

Original release
- Network: Channel 4
- Release: 27 October – 16 December 2001

Mondo Macabro is a British documentary television series written, produced and directed by Pete Tombs and Andy Starke. Based on Tombs' 1997 book Mondo Macabro: Weird & Wonderful Cinema Around the World, the series focuses on cult films from different countries around the world. The series ran for eight episodes and was first broadcast on Channel 4 in 2001.

== Broadcast history ==
Mondo Macabro first aired on Channel 4 from October to December 2001. Each episode was followed by a film relevant to the scope of that episode; for example, the episode "The Nightmares of Coffin Joe", which is about the films of Brazilian director José Mojica Marins, was followed by the 1970 Marins-directed film Awakening of the Beast; and the episode "Fantasy Films from Indonesia", which explores fantasy and martial arts films produced in Indonesia, was followed by the 1981 Indonesian fantasy martial arts film Jaka Sembung (The Warrior).

== Episodes ==
No.	Title	Original release date
1	"Thrillers from Manila"	10 November 2001
A short history of Filipino exploitation cinema. Featured interviewees: Eddie Romero, Peque Gallaga, Lore Reyes, Don Escudero, Manilyn Reynes.
2	"Mexican Horror Movies"	1 December 2001
A short history of Mexican B movies, from monster movies to masked wrestlers, to the avant garde art cinema of Alejandro Jodorowsky collaborator Juan Lopez Moctezuma. Featured interviewees: Ignacio Duran, David Wilt.
3	"South Asian Cinema"	17 November 2001
A short history of horror, fantasy and genre movies from Bollywood, South India and Pakistan. Featured interviewees: Kirin Kumar, Omar Khan, Mohan Bhakri, Neeraj Bhakri, Christopher Holmes.
4	"The Nightmares of Coffin Joe"	3 November 2001
A short documentary about Brazilian movie maverick José Mojica Marins ("Coffin Joe"). Featured interviewees: José Mojica Marins, André Barcinski, Nilcemar Leyart, Giorgio Attili.
5	"Fantasy Films from Indonesia"	7 December 2001
A short history of Indonesian fantasy and action movies of the 1970s and '80s, with a particular focus on the output of the Rapi Films studio which produced such films as Lady Terminator and Mystics in Bali. Featured interviewees: Raam Punjabi, Sunil Samtani, H. Tjut Djalil, Barry Prima, Iman Tantowi, Lydia Kandou, Aris Sofran Siagian, El Badrun, Inneke Koesherawati.
6	"Turkish Pop Cinema"	25 November 2001
A short history of Turkish popular cinema, featuring action and adventure, comic book heroes and giant octopus attacks Featured interviewees: Serhat Köksal (2/5BZ), Behçet Nacar, Aytekin Akkaya, Cüneyt Arkın, Metin Demirhan, Daniela Giordano, Doğan Tamer, Yılmaz Atadeniz, Mine Soley, Giovanni Scognamillo.
7	"Argentinian Exploitation"	27 October 2001
A short history of exploitation and B movies from Argentina, with a focus on the films of Isabelle Sarli (the "South American Marilyn Monroe") and the films of director Emilio Vieyra. Featured interviewees: Diego Curubeto, Emilio Vieyra, Isabel Sarli.
8	"The Erotic Empire"	16 December 2001
A short history of the Japanese pink film (pinku eiga) genre, focusing on the output of the Nikkatsu studio. Featured interviewees: Seijun Suzuki, Toshiyuki Matsushima, Romaine Slocombe, Kazuko Shirakawa.

== Home media ==
Episodes of Mondo Macabro have been included as bonus features on DVD releases by Tombs and Starke's home video label of the same name. The episode "Mexican Horror Movies" is included on the out-of-print Mondo Macabro DVD release of the 1957 Mexican film El vampiro (The Vampire); "South Asian Cinema" is included on their DVD release of the 1967 Pakistani film Zinda Laash (The Living Corpse); "The Nightmares of Coffin Joe" is included on their out-of-print DVD release of the 1969 Brazilian film Awakening of the Beast; "Fantasy Films from Indonesia" is included on their DVD release of the 1988 Indonesian film Lady Terminator; "Turkish Pop Cinema" is included on their out-of-print double feature DVD release of the Turkish films The Deathless Devil (1972) and Tarkan Versus the Vikings (1971); "Argentinian Exploitation" is included on their out-of-print DVD release of the 1967 Argentine film Blood of the Virgins; and "The Erotic Empire" is included on their DVD release of the 1978 Japanese film Sins of Sister Lucia.

Additionally, "The Erotic Empire" is also available as an extra on the Region-0 release of the Nikkatsu Roman porno film, Assault! Jack the Ripper (1976).
