= Special Silencers =

Indonesian martial arts horror film

- Promotional release poster
- Directed by: Arizal
- Starring: Barry Prima; Eva Arnaz; W. D. Mochtar
- Production company: P.T. Parkit Films
- Release date: 1982
- Country: Indonesia
- Language: Indonesian

Special Silencers (Indonesian: Serbuan Halilintar) is a 1982 (Note: See the Release section for details.) Indonesian martial arts horror exploitation film directed by Arizal and starring Barry Prima, Eva Arnaz and W. D. Mochtar. Prima plays Hendra, a man who arrives at a village where deaths are occurring as a result of red tablets—the titular "special silencers"—supplied by a forest-dwelling mystic; when ingested, the pills cause trees to burst from the consumer's stomach.

The film's titular plot element may have been inspired by the chestburster scene in Alien (1979).

== Cast ==
- Barry Prima as Hendra
- Eva Arnaz as Julia
- W. D. Mochtar as Gumilar

== Release ==
Distributor Mondo Macabro, who released the film on Blu-ray, identifies the film's release date as 1982. Other sources, such as author Pete Tombs, have identified its release date as 1979, but Mondo Macabro essayist Ekky Imanjaya writes, "I've had difficulties finding a valid source on the circulation of Special Silencers in the global film market in 1979. Most probably, it was sold straight to video." The film received distribution across Indonesia in 1982, with cuts made to "sexually suggestive and sadistic scenes" due to censorship.

=== Home media ===
Special Silencers was released on VHS in the Netherlands in the 1980s. A restoration of the film is set to be released on Blu-ray by Mondo Macabro in April 2024.

== Reception ==
In 2015, author Clive Davies called Special Silencers "a ridiculous action/horror crossover [...] Unusual but slow-moving, until the exciting finale involving smelly shoe torture, rats, gore and booby traps."
