= Arizal (director) =

Indonesian film director

Arizal (January 11, 1943 – May 18, 2014) was an Indonesian film director.

== Early life and education ==
Arizal was born in Airmolek, Indragiri, Riau on January 11, 1943. His parents, Ibrahim Sidi Mangkuto and Matayam bt M. Yasin, were of Minangkabau descent. He studied at the Faculty of Economics, University of Indonesia.

== Career ==
Arizal was one of Indonesia's most productive film directors and script writers. He directed 52 films and 8 soap operas (sinetron) with 1,196 episodes between 1974 and 2006. He directed the comedy film series of Warkop DKI. In the 1980s, his work brought success to Yessy Gusman, Rano Karno, Yenny Rachman, Roy Marten and Lydia Kandou as famous artists.

Arizal's best known films are Gita Cinta dari SMA (1979), Pintar-pintar Bodoh (1980) and Maju Kena Mundur Kena (1983), which achieved the highest audience in that year. Gita Cinta dari SMA was selected as one of the 25 best Indonesian films.

== Filmography ==
- Senyum dan Tangis (1974). Starring Rano Karno, Andy Carol, and Lenny Marlina. Achieved Citra Award (Piala Citra).
- Setulus Hatimu (1975). Starring Drg Fadly and Yanty Yosepha.
- Dr. Firdaus (1976). Starring Drg Fadly and Lenny Marlina.
- Hanya Untukmu (1976). Starring Drg Fadly and Lenny Marlina.
- Janji Sarinah (1976). Starring Drg Fadly and Lenny Marlina.
- Aula Cinta (1977). Starring Roy Marten, Yati Octavia and Debby Cyntia Dewi.
- Cowok Komersil (1977). Starring Robby Sugara, Yati Octavia, Debby Cyntian Dewi and Doris Cellebout.
- Semua Gue (1977). Starring Rano Karno, Yenny Rahman, and Yezzy Gusman.
- Secerah Senyum (1977). Starring Roy Marten and Yenny Rahman.
- Laki-laki Binal (1978). Starring Roy Marten and Yenny Rahman.
- Musim Bercinta (1978) Starring Roy Marten, Eva Arnaz, Rano Karno, and Yessy Guzman.
- Gita Cinta dari SMA (1979). Starring Rano Karno, Yessy Guzman, and Sherly Malinton.
- Kecupan Pertama (1979). Starring Yenny Rahman and Roy Marten.
- Puspa Indah Taman Hati (1979). Starring Rano Karno and Yessy Guzman.
- Remaja Idaman (1979). Starring Roy Marten and Joice Erna.
- Remaja Remaja (1979). Starring Rano Karno, Lydia Kandow and Yessy Guzman.
- Melodi Cinta (1979). Starring Lydia Kandow and Mangara Siahaan.
- Nikmatnya Cinta (1980). Starring Rano Karno, Lydia Kandow and Robby Sugara.
- Pintar Pintar Bodoh (1980). Starring Warkop DKI, Eva Arnaz, and Debby Cyntia Dewi.
- Rayuan Gombal (1980). Starring Monos, Nany Wijaya and Sandra Ciptadi.
- Bila Hati Perempuan Menjerit (1981). Starring Dana Christina and Roy Marten.
- Bodoh-bodoh Mujur (1981). Starring Otong Lenon and Eva Arnaz.
- Membakar Matahari (1981). Starring Barry Prima and Eva Arnaz.
- Dongkrak Antik (1981). Starring Warkop DKI, Mariam Belina, and Mat Solar.
- Serbuan Halilintar (1982). Starring Barry Prima, Eva Arnaz and Dicky Zulkarnaen.
- Bergola Ijo (1983). Starring Barry Prima, Eva Arnaz and Anasrul Jangkung.
- Maju Kena Mundur Kena (1983). Starring Warkop DKI, Eva Arnaz and Lydia Kandow.
- Pokoknya Beres (1983). Starring Warkop DKI, Eva Arnaz and Lydia Kandow.
- Itu Bisa Diatur (1984). Starring Warkop DKI, Ira Wibowo and Lia Waroka.
- Pencuri Cinta (1984). Starring Rico Tampatty and Ira Wibowo.
- Tahu Diri Dong (1984). Starring Warkop DKI, Eva Arnaz and Lydia Kandow.
- Gantian Dong (1985). Starring Warkop DKI, Lia Waroka and Chintami Atmanegara.
- Pengantin Baru (1986). Starring Lydia Kandow, Deddy Mizwar and Doyok.
- Segitiga Emas (1986). Starring Christina, Harry Capri, Mark Sunkar and Wilson Peter.
- Dendam Membara (1986). Starring Christ Mitchum, Mike Abbot and Ida Iasya.
- Sama-sama Enak (1987). Starring Sys NS, Chintami Atmanegara and Krisna.
- Bayar Tapi Nyicil (1988). Starring Didi Petet, Mariam Belina and Bagito Group.
- Lebih Asyik Sama Kamu (1989). Starring Paramitha Rusadi, Sally Marcelina and Ryan Hidayat.
- Membakar Lingkaran Api (1989). Starring Ricky Hosada, Peter John and Agus Melast.
- Pemburu Berdarah Dingin (1990). Starring Christ Mitchum, Ida Iasya and Roy Marten.
- Antri Dong (1990). Starring Nurul Arifin, Kadir, Doyok, Deddy Mizwar, Lydia Kandow and Eva Arnaz.
- Curi-curi Kesempatan (1990). Starring Nurul Arifin, Ray Sahepati, Sally Marcelina and Deddy Mizwar.
- Mana Bisa Tahan (1990). Starring Warkop DKI, Sally Marcelina Deddy Mizwar.
- Akal-akalan (1991). Starring Doyok, Kadir and Lia Waroka.
- Bisa Naik Bisa Turun (1991). Starring Warkop DKI and Kiky Fatmala.
- Sudah Pasti Tahan (1991). Starring Warkop DKI and Nurul Arifin.
- Masuk Kena Keluar Kena (1992). Starring Warkop DKI and Kiky Fatmala.
- Salah Masuk (1992). Starring Warkop DKI, Gitty Srinita, Tile and Fortunella.
- Salah Pencet (1992). Starring Kadir, Doyok, Kiky Fatmala and Tarida Gloria.
- Gara Gara (1993). Starring Jimmy Gideon, Lydia kandow, and Sion Gideon.
- Mumpung Ada Kesempatan (1993). Starring Kadir, Doyok, and Ayu Azhari.
- Saya Duluan Dong (1994). Starring Warkop DKI, and HIM Damsyik.
- Pencet Sana Pencet Sini (1994). Starring Warkop DKI.
- Kampanye Miliyader (2004). Starring Indosiar Fantasy Academy Stars, Warkop DKI, Roweina and Diah Permatasari.

== Television ==
- Gara-gara (RCTI, 1992–1993) 26 episode. Starring Lydia Kandow, Jimmy Gideon, Sion Gideon, Pitrajaya Burnama and Nani Widjaja.
- Ada-ada Saja (RCTI, 1993–1995) 130 episodes. Starring Nurul Arifin, Rudy Salam, Kiki Fatmala and Fuad Alkhar.
- Saling Silang (RCTI, 1995–1996) 54 episodes. Starring Debby Sahertian, Ida Kusuma, Eeng Saptahadi and Zainal Abidin.
- Jin dan Jun (RCTI, 1996–2002) 270 episodes. Starring Syahrul Gunawan, Mira Asmara, Misye Arsita, Fuad Baraja and M. Amin.
- Tuyul dan Mbak Yul (RCTI, 1997–2002) 270 episodes. Starring Onny Syahrial, Slamet Joyo and Dominiq Sanda.
- Tuyul Millennium (SCTV, 2002–2004) 108 episodes. Starring Jamal Bulat and Samson.
- Indra Keenam (RCTI, 2002–2003) 71 episode. Starring Gracia Indri, Joshua, Rachel Amanda and Dhea.
- Metropolitan Fantasi (Indosiar, 2003–2006) 267 episodes. Starring Indosiar Fantasy Academy Stars.
