= Jaka =

Jaka is a Slovenian given name, the Slovenian form for Jacob and James, and is also a Javanese name, the standard spelling for Joko. Notable people with the name include:

- Jaka (wrestler) (1986–2025), American professional wrestler
- Jaka Ankerst (born 1989), Slovenian ice hockey player
- Jaka Bizilj (born 1971), Slovenian film producer
- Jaka Blažič (born 1990), Slovenian professional basketball
- Jaka Hvala (born 1993), Slovenian ski jumper
- Jaka Tingkir, founder and the first king of the Sultanate of Pajang
- Almerindo Jaka Jamba (born 1949), Angolan politician and former rebel leader in UNITA
- Jaka Jazbec, Italian sprint canoeist who has competed since the mid-2000s
- Jaka Klobučar (born 1987), Slovenian professional basketball player
- Jaka Lakovič (born 1978), Slovenian professional basketball player
- Jaka Mwambi, Tanzanian politician and diplomat
- Jaka Singgih (born 1958), Indonesian businessman, managing director of Bumi Laut Group
- Jaka Štromajer (born 1983), Slovenian football striker
- Jaka Železnikar (born 1971), Slovene author of computational poetry and visual art

== See also ==
- JAKA Tower, planned office skyscraper in Makati, Philippines
- Jaka to Melodia, meaning "What Song is It?", is the Polish variation of the classic game show Name That Tune
- Jaka Sembung, a 1981 Indonesian fantasy martial arts film, based on a character of the same name
- Si Buta Lawan Jaka Sembung, a 1983 Indonesian sequel to 1981 film Jaka Sembung
- Jaka Baring Stadium, a multi-purpose stadium in Palembang, South Sumatra, Indonesia
