= Zinda Laash =

1967 Pakistani Urdu-language horror film

- DVD cover
- Directed by: Khwaja Sarfraz
- Written by: Naseem Rizwani; Khwaja Sarfraz
- Produced by: Abdul Baqi
- Starring: Asad Bukhari; Habib; Deeba; Rehan; Nasreen; Yasmin; Zareen Panna
- Cinematography: Nabi Ahmed; Raza Mir
- Music by: Tassaduq Hussain
- Release date: 7 July 1967
- Running time: 103 minutes
- Country: Pakistan
- Language: Urdu

Zinda Laash (Urdu: زندہ لاش, lit. 'Living Corpse') is a 1967 Pakistani Urdu-language horror film directed by Khwaja Sarfraz, and starring Asad Bukhari, Habib, Deeba, Rehan, Zareen Panna and Nasreen. The film's plot borrows heavily from the 1958 British Hammer Horror film Dracula, as well as from Bram Stoker's 1897 novel of the same name. It is the first horror film produced in Pakistan, and also the first to be X-rated.

Zinda Laash was released internationally under the title The Living Corpse, and was released in the United States as Dracula in Pakistan.

== Plot synopsis ==
Professor Tabini is experimenting on an elixir that he believes will conquer death. When he tries it on himself, however, he dies. His assistant finds his body, and carries it downstairs and into a crypt in the basement. He rises from the grave as a vampire and chomps down on her neck.

== Cast ==
- Asad Bukhari as Dr. Aqil Harker
- Habib as Aqil's brother
- Deeba as Shabnam
- Rehan as Professor Tabbani / The Vampire
- Yasmin as Shirin
- Talish as Doctor
- Cham Cham as the Dancer
- Zareen Panna as Dancer
- Nasreen as the Vampire bride
- Rangeela as Guy at Nightclub
- Munawar Zareef as Guy at Nightclub

== Release ==
=== Theatrical release ===
Zinda Laash was released theatrically on 7 July 1967, and was a box office disappointment.

=== Festival screenings ===
Zinda Laash has the distinction of being the first ever horror film to be screened at two major film festivals abroad; the Sitges Film Festival in Spain and the Neuchâtel International Fantastic Film Festival in Switzerland.

=== Home media ===
In 2003, Zinda Laash was released on DVD by the label Mondo Macabro. This release includes an audio commentary by Omar Khan and Pete Tombs, a making-of documentary, and "South Asian Cinema", an episode of the Channel 4 TV program Mondo Macabro.

== Reception ==
In a 2004 review of the film's DVD release, John Beifuss of The Commercial Appeal called the film "arguably the find of the year, for cult movie fans", writing: "A mind-bending fusion of Hammer-style vampirism with the exotic song-and-dance numbers that are all but mandatory for movies made in Pakistan and India, [Zinda Laash] is both derivative and innovative, campy and scary."
