= Samiun dan Dasima =

- Theatrical poster
- Directed by: Hasmanan
- Written by: Misbach Yusa Biran
- Produced by: LJN Hoffman; Chitra Dewi
- Starring: Chitra Dewi; W.D. Mochtar
- Cinematography: Leo Fioole
- Edited by: Janis Badar
- Music by: Idris Sardi
- Production company: Chitra Dewi Film Productions
- Distributed by: Bola Dunia Film
- Release date: 1971 (Indonesia)
- Country: Indonesia
- Language: Indonesian

Samiun dan Dasima (Indonesian for Samiun and Dasima) is a 1971 Indonesian film directed by Hasmanan. Starring Chitra Dewi and W.D. Mochtar, it follows a njai (concubine) named Dasima who is wooed, misled, and ultimately killed by a man who seeks her wealth.

== Plot ==
Dasima (Chitra Dewi) is the njai (concubine) of an Englishman named Edward William (A. Hamid Arief). She lives unhappily with him and their daughter, Nancy (Astri Ivo). Her wealth is recognised by Samiun (W.D. Mochtar), a black market vendor. Owing to the spending of his wife Hayati (Sofia W.D.) and the extortions of the gambling addict Puasa (Wahid Chan), Samiun is indebted to Chinese moneylenders. Hayati tells him that he may marry Dasima as a second wife to take her wealth.

Samiun—having claimed that he wants to bring Dasima back to Islam—gains the help of a dukun (shaman), who tells him to collect some of her hair to power the spell. He arranges for a woman named Mak Buyung (Fifi Young) to gain employment at William's house. Over time, Dasima and Mak Buyung become closer, and the former expresses concern for her position, feeling guilty for having left her Islamic teachings. Mak Buyung furtively takes some of her hair, and gives them to Samiun.

Using these hairs, the shaman prepares a powder that Mak Buyung mixes into Dasima's tea. Later that day, Mak Buyung arranges a meeting between Samiun and Dasima. Although at first Dasima is not interested, as time passes Mak Buyung praises Samiun and tells Dasima that he would accept her past. After witnessing a drunken William having sex with another woman, Dasima decides to leave him and Nancy.

Dasima moves in with Mak Buyung, and Samiun—urged on by Hayati—decides to make his move. He and Dasima are soon married. However, their marriage is unhappy. Samiun sells Dasima's possessions, and is unable to divide his time between Hayati and Dasima. Meanwhile, his business affairs collapse when the Dutch colonial police arrest his men. Samiun is unable to repay his debts, and ultimately he and Dasima fight.

Dasima longs to return to William and Nancy, and tearfully leaves. Samiun, desiring the last vestiges of her wealth, convinces Puasa to rob her. However, this plan goes awry when Dasima is knocked into a river and drowns. Her body is found on William's estate, and Samiun and Puasa are soon arrested. Afterwards, William decides to return to Europe with Nancy.

== Production ==
Production for Samiun dan Dasima began in 1970. The film was directed by Hasmanan and produced by LJN Hoffman and Chitra Dewi for the latter's production company Chitra Dewi Film Productions. Music was provided by Idris Sardi, and sound was managed by Suparman, Mudjiono, and Tabrani. Cinematography for this colour film was handled by Leo Fioole, and editing by Janis Badar. The film starred Chitra Dewi and W.D Mochtar in the title roles, with other major roles held by Sofia W.D., A. Hamid Arief, Wahid Chan, Astrie Ivo, and Fifi Young. Samiun dan Dasima also featured Nico Pelamonia as Banteng, Mansjur Sjah as A. Tong, Mohamad Mochtar, Wolly Sutinah, Dicky Zulkarnaen, Jopi Burnama, Rina Hassim, and Sulastri.

Samiun dan Dasima was based on the story of Njai Dasima, first penned as a novel by G. Francis in 1896 and later popularised through the traditional lenong theatre. It was the fifth film to be inspired by this novel, following Njai Dasima (1929), Njai Dasima (1932), and Dasima (1940), and Saodah (1956). Several changes were made to the story. Samiun, a delman driver in the novel, was made a black market goods vendor; less emphasis was placed on guna-guna (magic); and a scene of a man raping a woman was added. This version of the story was penned by Misbach Yusa Biran, based on retelling by SM Ardan. After changes were made to the story without his permission, Biran insisted that his name be removed; ultimately, however, the screened film still included him.

A reviewer in Tempo wrote in 1971 that, if it were not for the censors, Samiun dan Dasima would be the most sexual domestic production to date, as it included several topless scenes as well as a scene of a man kissing a woman's exposed breasts. Hasmanan defended the inclusion of the latter scene, arguing that it served to show Edward's true nature to Dasima. These sex scenes, according to Kompas, were not in Biran's original script.

== Release and reception ==
Samiun dan Dasima was released by March 1971 and distributed by Bola Dunia Film. According to Jean Gelman Taylor, this release title signaled the "primacy of the Indonesian world", as emphasis was given to Dasima's Indonesian husband rather than her European keeper. The film was also advertised as Njai Dasima. According to a flyer for a later screening of the film, Samiun dan Dasima played to full houses at eight first-class cinemas in Jakarta for four weeks.

Reviews of Samiun dan Dasima were mixed. The Tempo reviewer praised Young's acting as Mak Buyung, as well as Sofia's as Hayati. The reviewer was critical of Chan's performance, however, considering the actor to have shown no personality in his role. The plot, meanwhile, was criticised as plodding, allowing viewers to feel the film's two-hour run time. A reviewer in Kompas, meanwhile, considered Hasmanan to have failed in both presenting the story as a tragedy and in building up to a climax. The reviewer was also critical of the camerawork, considering it uncreative.

Samiun dan Dasima was screened in competition at the 17th Asian Film Festival in Taiwan, where Astri Ivo received the Golden Harvest Award for Best Child Actor.

== Works cited ==
- Biran, Misbach Yusa (2009). Sejarah Film 1900–1950: Bikin Film di Jawa [History of Film 1900–1950: Making Films in Java] (in Indonesian). Komunitas Bamboo working with the Jakarta Art Council. ISBN 978-979-3731-58-2.
- Kristanto, JB, ed. (2007). Katalog Film Indonesia 1926–2007. Jakarta: Nalar. ISBN 978-979-26-9006-4.
- "Dasimah & Hasmanan". Tempo (in Indonesian). 20 March 1971.
- "Samiun dan Dasima" [Samiun and Dasima]. Kompas (in Indonesian). 17 May 1971. pp. V–VI.
- Samiun dan Dasima (brochure) (in Indonesian), Chitra Dewi Film Productions, 1971
- Taylor, Jean Gelman (1996). "Nyai Dasima: Portrait of a Mistress in Literature and Film". In Laurie Jo Sears (ed.). Fantasizing the Feminine in Indonesia. Durham: Duke University Press. ISBN 978-0-8223-1684-8.
