= Arnaz =

Arnaz is a surname. Notable people with the surname include:

- Desi Arnaz (1917–1986), Cuban American musician, actor, and television producer
- Desi Arnaz Jr. (born 1953), American actor and musician
- Eva Arnaz (born 1958), Indonesian film actress
- Lucie Arnaz (born 1951), American actress
