= Immoral Tales =

Immoral Tales may refer to:

- Immoral Tales (book), a 1994 book by Cathal Tohill and Pete Tombs
- Immoral Tales (film), a 1973 French film directed by Walerian Borowczyk
- Champavert: Immortal Tales, an 1833 short story collection by Petrus Borel
