= The Devil's Sword =

- DVD cover
- Directed by: Ratno Timoer
- Written by: Imam Tantowi
- Produced by: Gope T. Samtani
- Starring: Barry Prima; Advent Bangun; Yos Santo
- Cinematography: Herman Susilo
- Edited by: E. Muksin Hamzah
- Music by: Gatot Sudarto
- Distributed by: Rapi Films
- Release date: 1984
- Running time: 101 minutes
- Country: Indonesia
- Language: Indonesian

The Devil's Sword (Indonesian: Golok Setan) is a 1984 Indonesian sword and sorcery film directed by Ratno Timoer. The film stars Indonesian action star Barry Prima who appears in such films as Ferocious Female Freedom Fighters and The Warrior. The Devil's Sword crosses over into many different genres of film. The film features martial arts, and also elements of fantasy, horror, sci-fi, and also some mild sexual content due to the portrayal of the Crocodile Queen.

== Background ==
Just like the better-known character Jaka Sembung, the protagonist of the film is taken from a comic book. 1987 film Mandala Dari Sungai Ular (Mandala from the Snake River), a sequel to The Devil's Sword, is an eponymous adaptation of the cartoon. The main difference between two characters is that Mandala is a warrior from the mythical pre-Islamic times of the Archipelago while Jaka Sembung is a Muslim and West Javanese freedom fighter against Dutch colonial rule.

== Plot ==
The Devil's Sword follows a quest to find an ancient sword that was forged from a mysterious metallic substance that fell to earth in the form of a meteorite. An old man who finds the meteorite creates the Devil's Sword, and he hides it after it burns down his hut. Whoever wields the sword holds the greatest power imaginable in his hands. Banyujaga (Advent Bangun) is sent by the Crocodile Queen (Gudhi Sintara) to steal the fiancé of a local village's princess (Enny Christina) to keep as her own subject. During the raid on the village, Mandala (Barry Prima), a one-time colleague of Banyujaga, sees the scuffle and helps defend the village, and ends up helping the princess recover her husband-to-be. Mandala recovers the Devil's Sword and must defeat the Crocodile Queen and Banyujaga.

== Reviews ==
- Internal Bleeding
