= Ebony & Ivory (film) =

2024 film by Jim Hosking

- Film poster
- Directed by: Jim Hosking
- Written by: Jim Hosking
- Produced by: Jim Hosking; Denzil Monk; Thelonious Brooks; Ant Timpson
- Starring: Sky Elobar; Gil Gex
- Cinematography: Mårten Tedin
- Edited by: Nick Armstrong; Mark Burnett
- Music by: Andrew Hung
- Distributed by: Anti-Worlds Releasing
- Release dates: September 20, 2024 (Fantastic Fest); September 19, 2025 (United Kingdom)
- Running time: 87 minutes
- Country: United Kingdom
- Language: English

Ebony & Ivory is a 2024 British stoner comedy film written, produced, and directed by Jim Hosking. It is about the musicians Paul McCartney and Stevie Wonder gathering on the Mull of Kintyre in Scotland to hang out, smoke marijuana, and discuss a possible collaboration. McCartney is played by Sky Elobar and Wonder is played by Gil Gex. Elijah Wood and Tim League are two of the executive producers. The film premiered at Fantastic Fest on September 20, 2024. It was given a limited theatrical release in the United States on August 8, 2025.

== Cast ==
- Sky Elobar as Paul
- Gil Gex as Stevie
- Carl Solomon as Zham Zham

== Reception ==
On the review aggregator website Rotten Tomatoes, 73% of 26 critics' reviews are positive, with an average rating of 5.6/10. Metacritic, which uses a weighted average, assigned the film a score of 49 out of 100, based on five critics, indicating "mixed or average" reviews.

Robert Daniels of RogerEbert.com gave the film three out of four stars and wrote, "[Y]our patience with this stoner comedy will likely vary, especially as the tone becomes more oddball and the visual language adopts a trippy aesthetic. Even when the film offers the viewer a performance of the titular song, it does so in the most juvenile and idiotic tone possible. That need to subvert assumptions while mixing high and low comedy to needle rather than entertain is what makes Ebony & Ivory pure art."

In a negative review, Calum Marsh of The New York Times wrote, "Ebony & Ivory is a deeply unpleasant movie. Grating, juvenile and repetitive, this eccentric stoner farce written and directed by Jim Hosking feels at times more like an experiment in social conditioning than a comedy — like one of those Stanley Milgram exercises designed to study the limits of human behavior, as if Hosking wanted to test how much suffering an audience could endure."

Ben Gibbons of Screen Rant gave it a score of 2 out of 10, writing, "There is absurdist comedy, and then there's this. Ebony & Ivory has the quirks to match, but it misses the mark. While the type of humor on display is already extremely niche, the film digs its heels in, turning it into a grating and uncomfortable watch."
