= Jaca (disambiguation) =

Jaca is a city in northeastern Spain.

Jaca or JACA may also refer to:

- Jaca, the Romanian name of the Hungarian village of Zsáka
- Jackfruit
- CH Jaca, a Spanish ice hockey team
- Jaca Navarra, a horse breed
- Journal of American Chiropractic Association

== See also ==
- Jacka (disambiguation)
- Jaka
