= Mondo Macabro (book) =

1997 book by Pete Tombs

Mondo Macabro: Weird & Wonderful Cinema Around the World
- First edition cover
- Author: Pete Tombs
- Language: English
- Genre: Non-fiction
- Publisher: Titan Books
- Publication date: October 1997
- Publication place: United Kingdom
- ISBN: 1-85286-865-1

Mondo Macabro: Weird & Wonderful Cinema Around the World is a book by British author Pete Tombs, first published in the United Kingdom in 1997 by Titan Books. A follow-up to the 1994 book Immoral Tales: Sex and Horror Cinema in Europe 1956–1984 (which Tombs co-wrote with Cathal Tohill), Mondo Macabro explores cult films and "bizarre cinema from around the world".

Mondo Macabro was published in the United States in 1998 by St. Martin's Griffin. The book served as an inspiration for the 2001 Channel 4 TV programme of the same name, which Tombs wrote, produced and directed alongside Andy Starke; it also led to the establishment of Mondo Macabro, a home video label created by the duo.

== Reception ==
Suzi Feay of The Independent noted that "As well as lurid synopses, [Mondo Macabro] has very funny picture captions".

Mark Harris of the Vancouver Sun wrote: "While Mondo Macabro is wider-ranging than Immoral Tales, it is not as good a read. At least half the chapters appear to have been hastily composed, many of the author's judgments halting, and the pages on Bollywood are frankly boring. [...] But by the time Tombs arrives in Japan, he regains his stride, for the last three chapters of Mondo Macabro show the same insouciant amorality that characterized his previous project."

The Star Tribune's Robert Armstrong wrote that Mondo Macabro "takes an entertaining look at the lurid and bizarre world of horror films, from Mexico and Brazil to Indonesia and Japan. There are super-hero ripoffs, buxom skull-masked female murderers, Japanese schoolgirls on the rampage and kung-fu-fighting gorillas. The black and white photos are revealing and the eight-page color insert of posters is hilarious."

In 2007, Brother Cleve of The Brooklyn Rail credited Tombs and Mondo Macabro as an aid to film fans in search of "something different and refreshing", writing: "Excavating offbeat film genres from Malaysia to Turkey to Mexico and beyond, Tombs' research helped stock the shelves at the more enterprising video shops around."
