= Candy Corn (disambiguation) =

Candy corn is a type of small, pyramid-shaped candy.

Candy Corn may also refer to:

- Candy Corn (film), a 2019 American horror film
- Col. Candy Corn, a character in the animated series Adventure Time episode "The Pajama War"
- The influencer known as Candycourn
