= Zibahkhana =

Zibahkhana: Hell's Ground
- Theatrical release poster
- Directed by: Omar Ali Khan
- Written by: Omar Ali Khan; Pete Tombs
- Produced by: Omar Ali Khan; Andrew Starke; Pete Tombs
- Starring: Ashfaq Bhatti; Sultan Billa; Osman Khalid Butt; Rubya Chaudhry; Rooshanie Ejaz; Najma Malik; Saleem Mairaj; Haider Raza; Rehan; Kunwar Ali Roshan
- Cinematography: Najaf Bilgrami
- Edited by: Andrew Starke
- Music by: Stephen Thrower
- Distributed by: Mondo Macabro
- Release date: 30 March 2007
- Running time: 80 minutes
- Country: Pakistan
- Languages: Urdu; English

Zibah khana (Urdu:ذبح خانہ; lit. 'Slaughterhouse', also known as Hell's Ground), is a 2007 Pakistani Urdu- and English-language zombie film directed and co-produced by Omar Khan, who also co-wrote the film alongside co-producer Pete Tombs.

Shot over the course of 30 days, Zibahkhana premiered at the NatFilm Festival in Denmark and has been screened at festivals including Toronto, New York City, London, Neuchatel, Stockholm, Cape Town, Austin, Philadelphia, Cambridge, Puerto Rico, Sitges, Valencia, Oslo and Helsinki. The film passed censors in Pakistan (with nine seconds cut) and became the first HDV and non-35 mm feature film released in Pakistani cinema history.

== Plot ==
Late at night, a lone driver nearly strikes a mysterious figure in the darkness. Following a car crash, the driver is attacked and killed by the figure.

Five friends skip school in Islamabad to attend a rock concert. The group comprises headstrong driver Vicki, struggling student Simon, wild child Roxi, horror enthusiast OJ, and timid Ash.

As they enter the countryside, it becomes evident that rural Pakistan faces significant water supply issues, with ongoing protests highlighting the problem.

The friends stop at a chai house to buy hashish and receive a stark warning about the surrounding countryside. A local sage declares it "Hell's Ground", warning them that the devil will find them. Dismissing the warnings, the teenagers continue their journey. OJ becomes ill after consuming a space cake, forcing the group to pull over. While vomiting in a stream, OJ is attacked by an unseen entity.

The teenagers are subsequently attacked by zombies, with one small zombie entering their van. They manage to escape. Seeking help, they encounter a holy man who offers to guide them to safety. When the holy man requests water from the van—which they do not have—he produces a severed head. The terrified teenagers force him from the truck and run him over, presumably killing him.

The van runs out of fuel, stranding the teenagers in the jungle. Feeling responsible for endangering his friends, Vicki goes to find help. Upon discovering a cabin, he is attacked and killed by a burqa-wearing maniac. Roxi, disturbed by the severed head, flees into the jungle and finds Vicki's corpse being mutilated by the maniac. Pursued by the killer, she seeks refuge in a cabin.

A kind elderly woman takes her in, mourning her son's marriage and the new motorway that has isolated her village. Noticing Roxi's injury, she leaves to find her son, a local healer.

Meanwhile, Simon and Ash realise OJ is missing. Discovering Vicki's keys and torch at the cabin where he was killed, they are chased by the maniac. Simon is killed, while Ash escapes to the van.

In the old woman's cabin, Roxi uncovers evidence that the maniac is the woman's daughter. After finding her son's skeleton, she flees the house. In the jungle, the old woman finds her other son, the holy man, dying. Swearing revenge, she instructs her daughter to kill the remaining teenagers. The maniac subsequently breaks Roxi's neck.

Ash is pursued through the woods but ultimately defeats the maniac by fashioning a weapon from barbed wire and a stick, before beating her to death with a rock. Using the maniac's mace, she ensures her death by staking her through the heart.

As dawn breaks, Ash finds OJ, who turns to attack her, having transformed into a zombie.

== Cast ==
- Kunwar Ali Roshan as Vicki
- Rooshanie Ejaz as Ayesha (Ash)
- Rubya Chaudhry as Roxi
- Haider Raza as Simon
- Osman Khalid Butt as O.J.
- Rehan as Deewana

== Release ==
The World Premiere was held at the NatFilm Festival in Copenhagen, Denmark on March 30, 2007, The US premiere was on the 6th of April at the Philadelphia Film Festival a week later. The film has played at over 40 International and especially Horror Film Festivals around the world winning Best Film Awards at Riofan Film Festival, Rio Brazil and at the Fantaspoa Film Festival, Port Allegre, Brazil. The film was also selected for an Audience Award at the Film Festival in Houston and also received honours for the Best Gore Effects at the same festival. The film was released in Pakistan commercially in the 3rd week of December 2007 in Pakistan after a protracted struggle with the Censor Board to have it cleared. The film ran successfully for 11 weeks at the Cineplex in Rawalpindi but its release in Karachi and Lahore was cut short due to the assassination of Benazir Bhutto that coincided with the films release.

The PVR cinema group in India picked up the Indian distribution after a screening at Osian's Film Festival in Delhi. The film was due to open in 14 select cinemas around the country but that was derailed by the Terror Attacks on Mumbai after which relations between India and Pakistan were badly soured. The films trailer was featured on the PVR website but a release never took place.

The film was screened at the Andy Warhol Film Institute in the US and also honoured at the Trash Film Festival in Tokyo, Japan in 2008

=== Home media ===
The film was released on DVD by TLA Releasing on 24 June 2008. It was later released by Danger After Dark on 4 August that same year.

The film has been issued on DVD in France, Japan, United Kingdom and the US.

== Critical reception ==
Zibahkhana received mostly positive reviews upon its release. Ain't It Cool News praised the film, calling it "one of the most badass flicks of the year". The reviewer also noted that although the film had its faults, mainly that it was stupid and predictable, "it's got something so incredibly captivating about it that it has its own place in the line of truly great indie horror flicks". Dread Central awarded the film a score of 4/5, calling it "a genuinely weird and somber horror movie that transposes familiar narrative themes from the genre into a cultural aesthetic few in the West will have had any prior glimpse of." Film Threat gave the film a positive review, commending its effective visuals, and strong nighttime atmosphere. The reviewer concluded by writing, "Overall, a measured mix of clichéd horror bits and wit to joke about them keeps Hell’s Ground even for a horror audience." The "Lazy Dads' Guide to Movies" gave the film a scathing review, ranking it as the worst film they had ever seen criticizing it especially for the use of English by the cast mixed in with Urdu. However many critics in the West are unfamiliar with the fact that in most South Asian cities The local language is frequently a blend of English and Urdu, sometimes referred to as "Minglish" and being British colonies a large percentage of schools and universities use English as the primary language of instruction.

On the review aggregator website Rotten Tomatoes, 100% of 6 critics' reviews are positive, with an average rating of 7.2/10.

=== Awards ===
- Won "Jury's Award for Best Film of 2008" at the Riofan Film Festival, Rio de Janeiro, Brazil.
- Won "Jury's Special Award for Best Gore 2007" at the Fantastic Film Festival, Austin, Texas.
- Won "Best Film" award at the Fantaspoa film festival 2009. Port Alegre, Brazil.
