= Jacka =

Jacka may refer to:

- Jacka, Australian Capital Territory, a suburb of Canberra, Australia
- The Jacka (1977–2015), American rapper
- Albert Jacka (1893–1932), Australian army captain
- Benedict Jacka (born 1980), British writer
- Beryl Elaine Jacka (1913–1989), Australian administrator
- David Jacka (born 1968), Australian aviator and activist

== See also ==
- Jacka Glacier, on Heard Island in the Indian Ocean
- Jaca (disambiguation)
- Jaka
