= Satan's Bed =

Satan's Bed may refer to:

- Satan's Bed (1965 film), an American exploitation film
- Satan's Bed (1986 film), an Indonesian horror film
- "Satan's Bed" (song), a song by Pearl Jam from their 1994 album Vitalogy
