= An Evening with Beverly Luff Linn =

2018 film directed by Jim Hosking

- Theatrical release poster
- Directed by: Jim Hosking
- Written by: Jim Hosking; David Wike
- Produced by: Sam Bisbee; Theodora Dunlap; Oliver Roskill; Emily Leo; Lucas Toh; Andy Starke; Robert Farrior (Executive producer)
- Starring: Aubrey Plaza; Emile Hirsch; Jemaine Clement; Matt Berry; Craig Robinson
- Cinematography: Nanu Segal
- Edited by: Mark Burnett
- Music by: Andrew Hung
- Production companies: Park Pictures; Wigwam Films; Rook Films; Film4; BFI; GPS Film Partners
- Distributed by: The Film Arcade (United States); Picturehouse Entertainment (United Kingdom)
- Release dates: January 20, 2018 (Sundance); October 19, 2018 (United States); October 23, 2018 (United Kingdom)
- Running time: 108 minutes
- Countries: United States; United Kingdom
- Language: English
- Box office: $23,515

An Evening with Beverly Luff Linn is a 2018 black comedy crime film directed by Jim Hosking, starring Aubrey Plaza, Emile Hirsch, Jemaine Clement, Matt Berry, and Craig Robinson.

== Plot ==
Lulu Danger is a waitress in a coffee shop managed by her husband, Shane, in a small town. One evening while watching television, Lulu sees an advertisement for a mysterious, upcoming live show to be held at the town's hotel called An Evening with Beverly Luff Linn; For One Magical Night Only. She recognizes Beverly from photos she keeps hidden in a dresser drawer and gets excited.

Meanwhile, Shane becomes incensed when he learns that Lulu's brother, Adjay, has more money than him and that he keeps his life's savings in a lockbox at his spice store. With the help of his dimwitted employees, Carl and Tyrone, Shane steals the lockbox, though Adjay quickly recognizes him as the culprit. Later, at the laundromat, decrying his situation, Adjay meets a drifter named Colin who offers to retrieve the lockbox in exchange for $200.

Colin goes to the Dangers', where Lulu catches him snooping outside and mistakes him for a friend of Shane's. He pulls a gun on Shane and demands the lockbox, but, when he panics, Lulu takes charge, taking the gun from Colin, retrieving the lockbox, and forcing him to drive her to the hotel.

Colin and Lulu check in, where they both awkwardly and bizarrely flirt. Beverly checks into the hotel along with his sidekick, a Scottish man named Rodney. He and Lulu immediately recognize one another, though Beverly—who appears to be subverbal and communicates only through a series of grunts— does not indicate this to Rodney, who secretly harbors feelings for him.

Behind Rodney's back, Beverly attempts to arrange a meeting with Lulu via a note, but Rodney intercepts it and drugs him. When she arrives to meet Beverly, she instead finds Rodney wearing synchronized swimming makeup; he tells her not to come between him and Beverly.

On the night of the show, Beverly apparently falls ill and the event is postponed for 24 hours, then for another day as Colin, Lulu, Beverly, and Rodney all jockey for one another's affections and Shane arrives at the hotel in search of the lockbox. The show's nature remains elusive and guests speculate as to what it will entail.

A despondent Colin has sex with a woman he meets in the hotel bar, only to learn that she's a prostitute. Later, he confesses the liaison to Lulu, upsetting her. Colin further confesses he had been a virgin up until then. Later, demanding to know the reason for Lulu's fixation on Beverly, she confesses that he was her college poetry professor and that he left his wife for her; in the midst of their affair, he apparently drowned while they were on vacation, an event which emotionally destroyed her.

Lulu, Colin, and other guests gather for the show, which is a simple musical revue in which Rodney and Beverly perform whimsical Scottish folk melodies. Beverly suddenly becomes articulate, singing in an incongruous alto and regaling the audience with stories of his time visiting Scotland. Addressing Lulu, he gives a heartfelt speech about lost love, apologizing for breaking her heart and telling Rodney that, while he loves him as a friend, he has no romantic feelings for him. The event ends when Shane and Carl crash the show while Tyrone steals the lockbox from Colin's room. A fight erupts between Colin, Shane, Carl, and hotel security.

Following Beverly to his room, Lulu demands to know why Beverly faked his death. He confesses that the decision was impulsive and that he didn't really have a reason. Beverly further admits everything he says onstage is similarly impulsive and that he's unsure he meant anything he said. A heartbroken Lulu leaves.

Lulu and Colin meet in the hotel bar, where she tries to make amends for her treatment of him. When F.R. David's "Words" begins to play—a song neither have heard before—Lulu invites Colin onto the dance floor and they share an exuberant dance that abruptly ends with her jumping into his arms. Later they return to their room to have sex, but Lulu falls asleep while Colin undresses. As he gets into bed, Lulu wakes up and they tell each other “I love you.”

== Cast ==
- Aubrey Plaza as Lulu Danger
- Emile Hirsch as Shane Danger
- Jemaine Clement as Colin Keith Threadener
- Matt Berry as Rodney Von Donkensteiger
- Craig Robinson as Beverly Luff Linn
- Zachary Cherry as Tyrone Paris
- Sky Elobar as Carl Ronk
- Jacob Wysocki as Lawrence Doggi
- Sam Dissanayake as Adjay Willis
- Maria Bamford as The Elegant Woman
- John Kerry as Kennedy Gordon
- Russ Burd as Barry Ofeld
- Carl Solomon as DJ Valerie Grillz
- Bettina Devin as Paulette
- Bruce J. Paz as The Captain
- Michael D. Cohen as Mitch Stemp
- Gil Gex as Myra Paris
- Kirsten Krieg as Hilda
- Luis Molina as Edwin
- Michael St. Michaels as Rupert Rumbini

== Production ==
In February 2017, it was announced Aubrey Plaza, Emile Hirsch, Jemaine Clement, Matt Berry and Craig Robinson had been cast for the film; that Jim Hosking would direct from a screenplay he wrote with David Wike. Sam Bisbee, Theodora Dunlap, Lucas Toh, Emily Leo and Andy Starke were its producers, and David Gordon Green, Hosking, Richard Garber, Robert Farrior and Lance Acord the executive producers under their Park Pictures, Rook Films, Wigwam Films, and Film4 Productions banners, respectively.

The film was shot on location in Eureka, Arcata and Fortuna, California, in early 2017. The Eureka Inn appeared as "The Moorhouse Hotel" in the film.

== Release ==
The film premiered at the 2018 Sundance Film Festival. In May 2018, Universal Pictures acquired its North American distribution rights, and released it in the United States on October 19, 2018. It was released in the United Kingdom on October 23, 2018, by Picturehouse Entertainment.

== Critical response ==
An Evening with Beverly Luff Linn received mixed reviews from film critics. It holds a 53% approval rating on review aggregation website Rotten Tomatoes, based on 51 reviews, with an average score of 5.4/10. The site's critical consensus reads, "An Evening with Beverly Luff Linn unites an intriguing array of comedic talents for a thoroughly unusual outing that proves itself disappointingly difficult to recommend." On Metacritic, the film holds a rating of 54 out of 100, based on 17 critics, indicating "mixed or average" reviews. Writing for Empire, critic Kim Newman recognized the potentially polarizing nature of the film, stating "...most of the slow-burn strangeness is a hoot. Some will find this impenetrable and irritating, but audiences willing to tune into Hosking's off-kilter style will be moved by the ridiculous love stories and relish the hilarious eccentricity."
