= Joko =

Joko may refer to:

== People ==
=== Given name ===
- Joko (Javanese name), a list of people with the Indonesian given name, especially Javanese people
- Joko Beck (1917–2011), American Zen teacher and author
- Joko Meštrović, birth name of James I. Mestrovitch (1894–1918), United States Army soldier awarded the Medal of Honor
- Jōkō Ninomiya (born 1954), Japanese founder of a style of full-contact karate
- Jōkō Obama (1886–1948), Japanese governor of Fukui Prefecture and Chief of Internal Affairs for the Governor-General of Taiwan
- Joachim Joko Winterscheidt (born 1979), German television host, producer and actor
- Joko Diaz, stage name of Filipino actor Francisco Gutierrez Diaz Jr. (fl. 1984–present)

=== Surname ===
- Bennet Joko, South African politician
- Mark Joko (born 1986), South African cricketer

== Other uses ==
- title of a retired Emperor of Japan (see Daijō Tennō)
- Jōko Station, a railway station in the town of Inawashiro, Fukushima Prefecture, Japan
