= Bajing Ireng dan Jaka Sembung =

1985 Indonesian film

- Theatrical release poster
- Directed by: H. Tjut Djalil
- Starring: Barry Prima; El Manik
- Edited by: Janis Badar
- Release date: 1985
- Country: Indonesia
- Language: Indonesian

Bajing Ireng dan Jaka Sembung (also known as Jaka Sembung & Bergola Ijo, The Warrior 3, or The Warrior and the Ninja) is a 1985 Indonesian fantasy martial arts film directed by H. Tjut Djalil. It is the third installment in the Jaka Sembung film series, following Jaka Sembung (1981) and Si Buta Lawan Jaka Sembung (1983). It stars Barry Prima and El Manik.

Bajing Ireng dan Jaka Sembung received two nominations at the 1984 Indonesian Film Festival (IFF): Best Supporting Actor for Manik, and Best Editing for Janis Badar.
