= Sky Elobar =

American actor

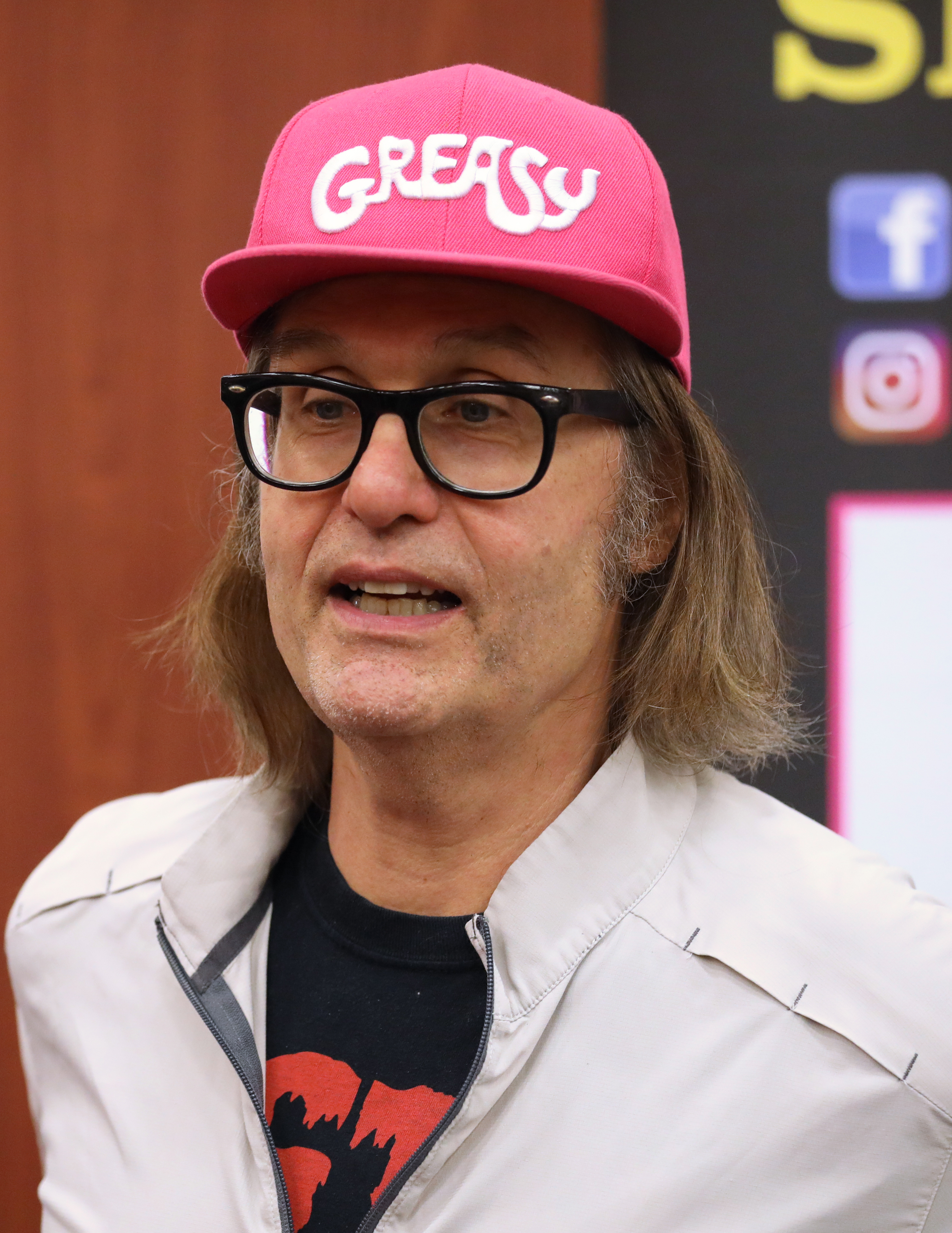
- Elobar in 2024
- Born: Sky Elobar
- Occupation: Actor
- Years active: 2007–present

Sky Elobar is an American actor. He is best known for playing Big Brayden in the absurdist horror film The Greasy Strangler and his other collaborations with director Jim Hosking.

== Career ==
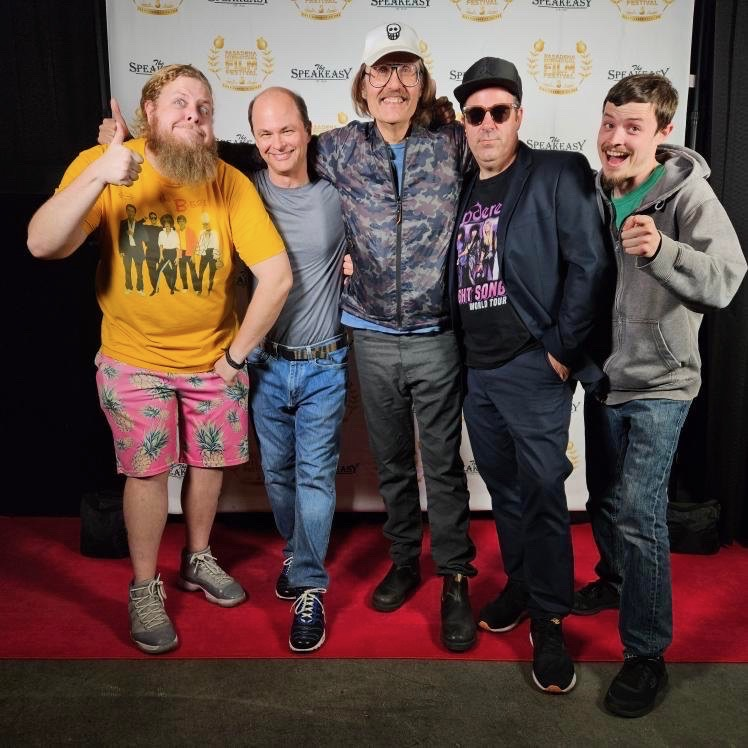
Sky Elobar, center of group, at a movie premiere

Since 2007, Elobar has appeared in numerous short films, TV shows, and feature films including Under the Silver Lake, An Evening with Beverly Luff Linn, and New Girl.

In 2016, Elobar landed the co-lead role in Jim Hosking's comedy-horror film The Greasy Strangler alongside Michael St. Michaels. The film proved to be a breakthrough smash at Sundance Film Festival.

Elobar and Hosking would collaborate further for the TV show Tropical Cop Tales and the movie An Evening with Beverly Luff Linn.

== Selected filmography ==
Film roles
Year	Title	Role	Notes
2007	Miss March	Mailman	Uncredited
2015	Don Verdean	Dr. Stanley	
2016	The Greasy Strangler	Big Brayden	
2016	Nina	Nina's Bass Player	Uncredited
2017	I Do... Until I Don't	Scotty	
2018	An Evening with Beverly Luff Linn	Carl Ronk	
2018	Back Roads	Church	
2018	Under the Silver Lake	Clerk	
2018	Candy Corn	Gus	
2023	Self Reliance	P.A. Ninja II	
2024	Ebony & Ivory	Paul	Also associate producer
2024	Solvent	Mike Haneke	

Television roles
Year	Title	Role	Notes
2007	My Name is Earl	Prison Guard (uncredited)	Episode: "Early Release"
2009	Sonny with a Chance	Paparrazzi	Episode: "Poll'd Apart"
2013	Kroll Show	Chip	Episode: "Mercury Poisoning"
2015	New Girl	Pasty Man	Episode: "Shark"
2016	Lady Dynamite	Glenn	2 Episodes
2017	Son of Zorn	Mr. Roller	Episode: "The Quest for Craig"
2017	Hidden America with Jonah Ray	Steve	Episode: "Minneapolis. Genuine. Cold."
2017	Good Game	Merle	Episode: "Blood Match"
2018-2019	Tropical Cop Tales	Various roles	4 episodes
