= W. D. Mochtar =

- Born: Wagino Dachrin Mochtar; 9 May 1928; Pontianak, Dutch East Indies
- Died: 13 December 1997 (aged 69); Indonesia
- Occupation: Actor
- Years active: 1950–1994

Wagino Dachrin Mochtar (9 May 1928 – 13 December 1997) was an Indonesian actor and the husband of Sofia W.D. He starred in Badai-Selatan (1962), Samiun dan Dasima (1971), Sanrego (1971), and Mystics in Bali (1981).

== Filmography ==
- Tirtonadi (1950)
- Dendan Sajang (1953)
- Malu Malu Kutjing (1954)
- Kali Brantas (1954)
- Mata Duitan (1955)
- Biola (1957)
- Badai Selatan (1960)
- Ibu Mertua (1960)
- Unggul Kasih Dimusim Kemarau (1964)
- Membina Dunia Baru (1964)
- Takan Lari Gunung Dikedjar (1965)
- Macan Kemayoran (1965)
- Luka Tiga Kali (1965)
- Terpesona -(1966)
- Djampang (1968)
- Djampang Mentjari Naga Hitam (1968)
- Laki-laki Tak Bernama (1969)
- Si Bego Menumpas Kutjing Hitam (1970)
- Sanrego (1971)
- Banteng Betawi (1971)
- Jang Djatuh Dikaki Lelaki (1971)
- Api Bukit Menoreh (1971)
- Pengantin Remaja (1971)
- Singa Betina dari Marunda (1971)
- Tjinta di Batas Peron (1971)
- Seriti Emas, Kipas Sutra (1971)
- Bengawan Solo (1971)
- Teror Tengah Malam (1972)
- Kabut Kintamani (1972)
- Samiun dan Dasima (1972)
- Timang-Timang Anaku Sayang (1973)
- Batas Impian (1974)
- Anak Yang Menderita (1974)
- Anak Binatang (1974)
- Pacar (1974)
- Tanah Harapan (1976)
- Pukulan Berantai (1977)
- Laki-Laki dalam Pelukan (1977)
- Pendekar Tangan Hitam (1977)
- Bersemi di Akhir Badai (1978)
- Laki-Laki Binal (1978)
- Petualang-Petualang (1978)
- Miliku (1979)
- Si Ayub dari Teluk Telaga (1979)
- Pengabdi Setan (1980)
- Jangan Sakiti Hatinya (1980)
- Gundala Putra Petir (1981)
- Mystics in Bali (1981)
- Melawan Badai (1982)
- Pak Sakerah (1982)
- Serbuhan Hallintar (1982)
- Bayi Ajaib (1982)
- Pasukan Berani Mati (1982)
- Roro Mendut (1983)
- Lara Jonggrang (1983)
- Saat-Saat Kau Berbaring Di Dadaku (1984)
- No Time to Die (1984)
- Tirai Kasih (1984)
- Ranjau Ranjau Cinta (1984)
- Satria Bergitar (1984)
- Dendam Dua Jagoan (1986)
- Pertarungan Untuk Hidup (1986)
- Memburu Makelar Mayat (1986)
- Mistri Rumah Tua (1987)
- Anak-Anak Gass (1988)
- Cintaku di Way Kambas (1990)
- Pendekar Cabe Rawit (1990)
- Turangga (1990)
- Mistri Dari Gunung Merapi 3 (1990)
- Balada Tiga Jagoan (1990)
- Nada Dan Dakwah (1991)
