= Dominique Witten =

American comedian and actress

Comedy career
- Years active: 1997–present
- Medium: Stand-up; film; television
- Genres: Observational comedy; surreal humor; black comedy
- Subjects: African-American culture; everyday life; American politics

Dominique Witten, also known mononymously as Dominique, is an American comedian and actress. She starred in the Adult Swim television series Black Jesus (2014–2019) and Tropical Cop Tales (2019) and was a finalist on the ninth season of the NBC reality competition series Last Comic Standing in 2015.

== Life and career ==
Dominique was raised in Washington, D.C. in a large Black family. Before becoming a comedian, Dominique worked at a post office in Brentwood and at an OB-GYN's office. Her first foray into comedy was at an open mic at the Greenbelt Comedy Connection in Washington; she later quit her day job and moved to the Bronx to pursue a career in stand-up comedy. Throughout her career, Dominique has made appearances on Chappelle's Show, the Tom Joyner Morning Show, and on Def Comedy Jam. She played Shalinka on the Adult Swim sitcom Black Jesus from 2014 to 2019 and starred in Tropical Cop Tales, another Adult Swim comedy series, as Primetime Weeyums in 2019. She was a finalist on the ninth season of the NBC reality competition series Last Comic Standing in 2015.

== Filmography ==
| Year | Title | Role | Notes |
|---|---|---|---|
| 2003–2004 | Chappelle's Show | Various characters | 2 episodes |
| 2013–2015 | Beverly Hills Pawn | Herself | Main role; 44 episodes |
| 2014–2019 | Black Jesus | Shalinka | 13 episodes |
| 2015 | Last Comic Standing | Herself | Finalist on season 9 |
| 2016 | Boo! A Madea Halloween | Police Officer #3 | |
| 2017 | Dominique Witten: Stop Me When I'm Lying! | Herself | |
| 2019 | Kevin Hart's Guide to Black History | Mary Fields | Television film |
| 2019 | Tropical Cop Tales | Primetime Weeyums | Main role; 10 episodes |
| 2020 | All the Way Black | Herself | Episode: "It's My House!" |
