= Killing (comics) =

Italian photo comic series since 1966

Publication information
- Publisher: Ponzoni Editore
- Format: Ongoing series
- Publication date: (Original) 1966–1969 (U.S.) 2005–present
- No. of issues: 62

Killing is an Italian photo comic series about a vicious criminal, the title character (also known as Satanik). It has been published intermittently since the 1960s under various titles.

== Synopsis ==
Killing is a vicious criminal, totally without mercy and portrayed throughout the series without credit by Aldo Agliata. Wearing a black and white costume styled on a human skeleton (designed by movie special effects wizard Carlo Rambaldi), he slaughters other criminals unrepentantly, often stealing their once-stolen loot. He crafts masks from a flesh-like substance to imitate his victims. Killing's methods are brutal and sadistic, and the lurid covers and stories often feature him attacking, torturing, and murdering scantily clad women.

Supporting characters include Killing's lover Dana (portrayed by actress Luciana Paoli), the only person who has seen him unmasked, and Inspector Mercier (actor Dario Michaelis), a determined police officer who always just misses catching and detaining Killing for his crimes. The series also featured a rotating troupe of actors who also appeared in many European spaghetti westerns, spy films, sword and sandal, giallo (horror/crime) and exploitation films of the era.

The character of Killing was inspired by several previous characters from French and Italian pulp fiction, including Fantômas, Diabolik, and especially Kriminal. Killing's books, however, were far more violent and sexually explicit than those of his predecessors.

== International versions ==
The series was entitled Satanik in the French edition, Kiling in Argentina as well as being published in Belgium, Brazil, Colombia, Germany and Venezuela. Sold as "Photostories for Adults", it ran for 62 issues (19 in France) starting in 1966, and was published by Pino Ponzoni's Ponzoni Editore and editor Pietro Granelli with each episode directed by actor and singer Rosario Borelli. The character was also known as KiLiNK, the star of several unauthorized films shot in Turkey during the late 1960s and early '70s (most notably Killing in Istanbul). The Argentinean series ran out of the Italian stories and began shooting new adventures that lasted until the 1980s. The series is currently being revived by American editor and comics creator Mort Todd, under the new title, Sadistik: The Diabolikal Super-Kriminal. The documentary about the character The Diabolikal Super-Kriminal directed by SS-Sunda had its US premiere at San Diego Comic-Con on July 25, 2009, where it received Special Mention by the judges.
