= Tropical Cop Tales =

- Genre: Adult humor Black comedy Surreal humor
- Created by: Toby Harvard; Jim Hosking
- Written by: Toby Harvard; Jim Hosking
- Directed by: Jim Hosking
- Starring: Dominique Witten; Ted Ferguson; Carl Solomon; Grant Goodman; Stephen Hart
- Theme music composer: Chris Bilheimer
- Composer: Andrew Hung
- Country of origin: United States
- Original language: English
- No. of seasons: 1
- No. of episodes: 10 (list of episodes)

Production
- Executive producers: Jim Hosking; Toby Harvard; Mark Costa (Note: for Alive and Kicking, Inc.); Keith Crofford (Note: for Williams Street); Walter Newman
- Producer: Cameron Boling
- Cinematography: Mårten Tedin
- Editors: Gennady Fridman (Pilot); Marissa Mueller (Series)
- Production companies: Boxel Studio; Alive and Kicking, Inc.; Another HH Production; Williams Street

Original release
- Network: Adult Swim
- Release: February 1 – March 1, 2019

Tropical Cop Tales is an American comedy television series created by Jim Hosking and Toby Harvard for Adult Swim. The show revolves around two burned-out city cops, Keymarion "Primetime" Weeyums and Demetrius "Meechie" Franks, who have both relocated to an unnamed small tropical town for a relaxing end to their careers, but soon find out the town is not at all relaxing. The series is produced by Alive and Kicking, Inc.

A pilot for the series was commissioned, and scenes were previewed on the Adult Swim streaming series Development Meeting, hosted by company vice presidents Walter Newman and Cameron Tang. On June 27, 2018, Adult Swim announced that the series would have its official premiere on July 29, 2018.

On May 24, 2020, Adult Swim canceled Tropical Cop Tales following the first season. The series was not picked up for a second season.

== Cast ==
- Dominique Witten as Primetime Weeyums
- Ted Ferguson as Meechie Franks
- Carl Solomon as Captain Solomon
- Gil Gex as Dame Edith Ezold
- Sky Elobar as Little Lord Piss The Pot
- Grant Goodman as Angus Franks
- Wayne Dehart as Old Mungo Weeyums
- Stephen Hart as Young Mungo Weeyums
- Troy Beecham as Andre The Chef
- Brian Russell as Cocky Rico
- Jennifer Van Horn as Governor Mary Gold
- Holland MacFallister as Animale
- Bob McHone as Big Danny
- Charles Noland as Don Quidong
- Mike Benitez as Ronald the Ringman
- Michael St Michaels as Seedy Dave
- Sam Dissanayake as King Skull
- Jerry Ascione as Nattanyell
- William Tokarsky as Man with Gold boots

== Episodes ==
=== Pilot (2018) ===
| No. | Title | Directed by | Written by | Original release date | Prod. code |
|---|---|---|---|---|---|
| 0 | "Tropical Cop Tales" | Jim Hosking | Toby Harvard and Jim Hosking | July 29, 2018 | TBA |

=== Season 1 (2019) ===
| No. overall | No. in season | Title | Directed by | Written by | Original release date | Prod. code | US viewers (millions) |
|---|---|---|---|---|---|---|---|
| 1 | 1 | "The How to Be a Tropical Cop Episode" | Jim Hosking | Toby Harvard and Jim Hosking | February 1, 2019 | TBA | 0.57 |
| 2 | 2 | "The Scalp Collector" | Jim Hosking | Toby Harvard and Jim Hosking | February 1, 2019 | TBA | 0.44 |
| 3 | 3 | "The Shrimp Gang Are Back" | Jim Hosking | Toby Harvard and Jim Hosking | February 8, 2019 | TBA | 0.58 |
| 4 | 4 | "The Big Night In" | Jim Hosking | Toby Harvard and Jim Hosking | February 8, 2019 | TBA | 0.49 |
| 5 | 5 | "The Terror That Is Cabbage Fizzog" | Jim Hosking | Toby Harvard and Jim Hosking | February 15, 2019 | TBA | 0.74 |
| 6 | 6 | "The Dawning of King Skull" | Jim Hosking | Toby Harvard and Jim Hosking | February 15, 2019 | TBA | 0.61 |
| 7 | 7 | "The Hand Gobbler" | Jim Hosking | Toby Harvard and Jim Hosking | February 22, 2019 | TBA | 0.52 |
| 8 | 8 | "The Night of the Fang" | Jim Hosking | Toby Harvard and Jim Hosking | February 22, 2019 | TBA | 0.44 |
| 9 | 9 | "The Many Frostings of Ronald the Ringman" | Jim Hosking | Toby Harvard and Jim Hosking | March 1, 2019 | TBA | 0.72 |
| 10 | 10 | "The Sports Day" | Jim Hosking | Toby Harvard and Jim Hosking | March 1, 2019 | TBA | 0.57 |
