= Lemon (2017 film) =

- Theatrical release poster
- Directed by: Janicza Bravo
- Written by: Janicza Bravo; Brett Gelman
- Produced by: David Bernon; Paul Bernon; Houston King; Sam Slater; Han West
- Starring: Brett Gelman; Judy Greer; Michael Cera; Shiri Appleby; Fred Melamed; Rhea Perlman; David Paymer; Gillian Jacobs; Jon Daly; Martin Starr; Megan Mullally; Jeff Garlin; Elizabeth De Razzo; Marla Gibbs; Nia Long
- Cinematography: Jason McCormick
- Edited by: Joi McMillon
- Music by: Heather Christian
- Production companies: Burn Later Productions; Killer Films; CYRK Productions
- Distributed by: Magnolia Pictures
- Release dates: January 22, 2017 (Sundance); August 18, 2017 (United States)
- Running time: 83 minutes
- Country: United States
- Language: English

Lemon is an American comedy-drama film directed by Janicza Bravo in her feature directorial debut, from a screenplay by Bravo and Brett Gelman. It stars Gelman, Judy Greer, Michael Cera, Shiri Appleby, Fred Melamed, Rhea Perlman, David Paymer, Gillian Jacobs, Jon Daly, Martin Starr, Megan Mullally, Jeff Garlin, Elizabeth De Razzo, Marla Gibbs and Nia Long.

The film had its world premiere at the Sundance Film Festival on January 22, 2017. It was released in a limited release and through video on demand on August 18, 2017, by Magnolia Pictures.

== Plot ==
Isaac is a middle-aged actor who lives with his girlfriend, Ramona, who is blind and works for a pharmaceutical company that requires her to travel frequently.

Isaac leads an acting workshop where he routinely lavishes praise on Alex, his star pupil who is also a working actor, while either denigrating or ignoring Tracy, another one of his students. He is secretly jealous of Alex as his own acting career has devolved into commercial and modeling work for pharmaceutical products.

After overhearing a message from Ramona in which a man can be heard in the background, Isaac has a breakdown. He invites Alex over for dinner, accusing him of using him and then trying to kiss him. Afterward, Ramona returns home from her trip and breaks up with Isaac ending their 10-year relationship.

Isaac goes to his family's home for Passover. His entire family is involved in petty grievances with one another and Isaac fails to mention that he and Ramona have broken up.

Isaac decides to ask out Cleopatra, a makeup artist he met on a photo shoot. The date does not go well but after Isaac admits he was nervous Cleopatra decides to give him a second chance. Their follow-up date does not go well either, but Isaac continues to worm his way into Cleopatra's life.

Attending a barbecue with Cleopatra's family, Isaac has awkward conversations with her family, and eventually takes a couple hits from a blunt. While high, Isaac converses with Cleopatra's aunt, who he seems to hear tell him she is lonely, and she urges him to "run". He tries to escape with her, but Cleopatra tracks them down and returns home with her aunt.

After rushing home to go to the bathroom he hears Ramona entering the house and pleads with her to come back. She tells him she has only come to return her house key and leaves.

== Cast ==
- Brett Gelman as Isaac Lachmann
- Judy Greer as Ramona, Isaac’s girlfriend
- Michael Cera as Alex
- Nia Long as Cleo
- Shiri Appleby as Ruthie, Isaac's sister
- Fred Melamed as Howard, Isaac's father
- Gillian Jacobs as Tracy
- Rhea Perlman as Esther, Isaac's mother
- Martin Starr as Adam, Isaac’s brother
- Megan Mullally as Simone
- Jeff Garlin as Guy Roach, Isaac's agent
- Marla Gibbs as Lilly
- Rex Lee as Jazz
- Jon Daly as Toby
- Elizabeth De Razzo as Rosa
- Ashley Silverman as Becca
- Hank Chen as Lee
- David Paymer as Dr. Gold

== Production ==
In August 2016, it was announced that Brett Gelman, Judy Greer, Michael Cera, Nia Long, Fred Melamed, Shiri Appleby, Rhea Perlman, David Paymer, Gillian Jacobs, Megan Mullally, Martin Starr, Jeff Garlin and Marla Gibbs would star in the film, with Janicza Bravo directing and executive producing the film from a screenplay she wrote alongside Gelman. Paul Bernon, Sam Slater, David Bernon, Han West, Houston King, Christine Vachon, and David Hinojosa would serve as producers and executive producers, respectively, under their Burn Later Productions and Killer Films banners.

=== Filming ===
Principal photography concluded in August 2016.

== Release ==
The film had its world premiere at the Sundance Film Festival on January 22, 2017. The film also opened the 46th International Film Festival Rotterdam January 25, 2017. It also screened at South by Southwest on March 10, 2017. Shortly after, Magnolia Pictures acquired distribution rights to the film. It was released on August 18, 2017.

=== Critical reception ===
On Rotten Tomatoes, the film has an approval rating of 55% based on 47 reviews, with an average rating of 5.3 out of 10. The site's critical consensus says "Lemon succeeds in its aim as a tart satire, but audiences may find this foray into abrasiveness too sour to swallow." On Metacritic, the film has a weighted average score of 59 out of 100 based on reviews from 20 critics, indicating "mixed or average" reviews.

Todd McCarthy of The Hollywood Reporter praised the film, and wrote: "Lemon represents a feature debut of unusual assurance and control with a style all its own."

Owen Gleiberman of Variety gave it a mixed review: "Lemon is a comedy of miserablism that keeps poking you in the ribs — and, quite often, fails to hit the rib it’s aiming for. Yet it’s a watchable curio, because beneath it all the director, the Panamanian-born Janicza Bravo, has a more conventional sensibility than she lets on."
