= Satan's Bed (1986 film) =

1986 Indonesian horror film

- Theatrical release poster
- Directed by: Tjut Djalil
- Starring: Chintami Atmanagara; Marianne Wolf; Richie Ricardo; Gusti Randa; Eva Elisa; Bokir
- Release date: 1986
- Country: Indonesia
- Language: Indonesian

Satan's Bed (Indonesian: Batas Impian Ranjang Setan, or simply Ranjang Setan) is a 1986 Indonesian horror film directed by Tjut Djalil. The film's plot, which borrows elements from the A Nightmare on Elm Street series, concerns a house haunted by a Dutch ghost.

Satan's Bed stars Chintami Atmanagara, Marianne Wolf, Richie Ricardo, Gusti Randa, Eva Elisa, and Bokir.
