= Badai-Selatan =

1961 film

- Directed by: Sofia W. D.
- Starring: W. D. Mochtar
- Cinematography: L. K. Hasanudin
- Release date: 1961
- Running time: 92 minutes
- Country: Indonesia
- Language: Indonesian

Badai-Selatan is a 1961 Indonesian horror film directed by Sofia W. D. It was entered into the 12th Berlin International Film Festival.

== Cast ==
- W.D. Mochtar
- Sukarno M. Noor
- Ida Nursanti
