= Tarkan Versus the Vikings =

1971 Turkish action film

- Theatrical release poster
- Directed by: Mehmet Aslan
- Written by: Sadık Şendil; Sezgin Burak
- Produced by: Ertem Eğilmez; Teoman Tümer
- Starring: Kartal Tibet; Bilal İnci; Fatma Belgen; Arap Celal; Eva Bender; Atıf Kaptan; Seher Şeniz; Hüseyin Alp
- Cinematography: Cahit Engin
- Edited by: Cahit Engin
- Production companies: Arzu Film; Tuna Film
- Distributed by: Acar Film
- Release date: November 1, 1971
- Running time: 86 minutes
- Country: Turkey
- Language: Turkish

Tarkan Versus the Vikings (Turkish: Tarkan Viking Kanı) is a 1971 Turkish action film, directed by Ertem Eğilmez based on a comic strip by Sezgin Burak, starring Kartal Tibet as fictional Hunnic warrior Tarkan, who vows revenge against Viking raiders after they ambush him and leave him for dead. The film, which went on nationwide general release on November 1, 1971, was the fifth in a series of seven films based on the comic strip character.

Tarkan Versus the Vikings was released in the US in 2005 by Mondo Macabro on a double-bill DVD with The Deathless Devil.
