= The Deathless Devil =

- Theatrical Poster
- Directed by: Yılmaz Atadeniz
- Written by: Yılmaz Atadeniz; Orhan Atadeniz
- Produced by: Yılmaz Atadeniz
- Starring: Kunt Tulgar; Mine Mutlu; Erol Taş; Muzaffer Tema; Erol Günaydın
- Cinematography: Sertaç Karan
- Edited by: Necdet Tok
- Production company: Atadeniz Film
- Release date: October 1, 1972
- Running time: 84 mins.
- Country: Turkey
- Language: Turkish

The Deathless Devil (Turkish: Yılmayan Şeytan) is a 1972 Turkish action film, co-written, produced and directed by Yılmaz Atadeniz, starring Kunt Tulgar as a young man who takes up his father's mantle as masked crimefighter Copperhead to defeat the evil Dr. Satan. The film, which went on nationwide general release on October 1, 1972, was released in the US by Mondo Macabro in 2005 on a double-bill DVD with Tarkan Versus the Vikings. The film is a remake of the 1940 serial Mysterious Doctor Satan.
