= Mystics in Bali =

1981 Indonesian horror film

- DVD cover
- Directed by: Tjut Djalil
- Written by: Putra Mada; Jimmy Atmaja
- Produced by: Abdul Muis Sofian; Hendry Katili; Sri Gunawan
- Starring: Ilona Agathe Bastian; Yos Santo; Sofia W.D.; W.D. Mochtar
- Edited by: Djuki Paimin
- Music by: Gatot Sudarto
- Production companies: Pusat Perusahaan Film; Video Tape Corp.
- Release date: 1981
- Running time: 86 minutes
- Country: Indonesia
- Language: Indonesian

Mystics in Bali (Indonesian: Mistik (Punahnya Rahasia Ilmu Iblis Leak)), also released as Leák and Balinese Mystic, is a 1981 Indonesian supernatural horror film directed by Tjut Djalil. Based on the novel Leák Ngakak by Putra Mada, the film stars Ilona Agathe Bastian, Yos Santo, Sofia W.D., and W.D. Mochtar.

Mystics in Bali follows an anthropologist named Cathy (Bastian) who travels to Bali to research black magic, eventually becoming the disciple of a witch and transforming into a bloodthirsty disembodied head, with her organs and entrails hanging from her neck. The film borrows elements from Southeast Asian folklore and Balinese mythology, including the Penanggalan and the Leyak respectively (the Leyak being Balinese, the Penanggalan being from Malaysian ghost myths), entities which have in common that they take the form of flying heads with innards still attached.

== Plot ==
Catherine "Cathy" Kean is a foreign anthropologist (Note: Depending on what market the film was released in, Cathy is identified as either an American or Australian woman.) who travels to Bali to write a book about black magic. She learns of Leák magic from her lover Mahendra, who says that it is the most powerful form of black magic and that it can be used to kill. After attending a ceremonial ritual, Mahendra agrees to help Cathy study magic, and they share a kiss as an unknown woman watches from afar. The next night, after a brief thunderstorm, the two meet the cackling leader of the Leák cult, an old witch with long fingernails known as the Queen of the Leák.

The Queen of the Leák shows the two her face, but says that her face changes every time she makes an appearance. Before departing, the Queen shakes hands with Cathy, only for the Queen to disappear with her severed arm left in Cathy's grip. Cathy drops it in fright, and the arm crawls a short distance and stops before vanishing. The following night, Cathy and Mahendra bring bottles of blood to quench the Queen's thirst. The Queen, revealing herself only as a prehensile tongue, orders Cathy to take off her skirt, and carves a spell into Cathy's upper thigh. The Queen demands that Cathy return the next night, and that Mahendra is not to join her.

The next day, Cathy asks Mahendra to read the spell on her thigh, but he can only decipher the word "Leák". At midnight, wearing a tapis, Cathy ventures into the graveyard. The Queen appears, cackling, and Cathy laughs maniacally and dances with her, and they transform into pigs. Later, Mahendra's uncle, Machesse, teaches him mantras which can counteract Leák magic. Cathy tells Mahendra that she and the Queen could communicate telepathically, and that she envisioned destroying a wall of fire, which Mahendra says means that she killed someone somewhere. Cathy feels ill, but tells Mahendra that the Queen will cure her illness that night. In her meeting with the Queen that night, Cathy's head, organs, and entrails detach from her body. Now a floating, disembodied head under the control of the Queen, Cathy's head flies into the home of a pregnant woman and devours the unborn baby from the mother's womb.

Cathy's head returns to her body, her illness is cured, and the blood she consumed invigorates the Queen's youthfulness and power. They transform into snakes, and Cathy awakens as a human and vomits mice. During the night, in the form of fireballs, the Queen and Cathy defeat one of the Queen's enemies. The unknown woman witnesses Cathy's head flying, and she tells Machesse, who informs his colleagues of the evil and retreats to meditate. The Queen appears to Cathy as a young woman and detaches her head again. Machesse finds Cathy's headless body, and the townspeople attempt to ward off the flying head. Machesse tells Mahendra that Cathy is no longer the woman he loves, and they bury her body to prevent the head from reattaching. Mahendra dreams of Cathy, who pleads for her body to be exhumed.

That night, the Queen and the flying head appear to Machesse and Mahendra in the graveyard. The Queen, revealed to be an old rival of Machesse, uses her powers to disinter Cathy's body. The head reattaches, and the Queen electrocutes Machesse and slices his neck, killing him. The unknown woman, revealed to be Mahendra's former lover, tries to attack the Queen but is killed. Mahendra's uncle Oka appears and attacks the Queen. The Queen transforms into a humanoid pig, which Oka stabs in the heart with a dagger. Becoming a masked figure, the Queen shoots energy at Oka, who projects energy in return, causing an explosion. The Queen and Cathy are killed by the sunrise.

== Cast ==
- Ilona Agathe Bastian as Catherine "Cathy" Kean
- Yos Santo as Mahendra
- Sofia W.D. as the Old Queen of the Leák
  - Debby Cynthia Dewi as the Young Queen of the Leák
- W.D. Mochtar as Machesse / Oka

== Production ==
In the late 1970s and early 1980s, the Indonesian government saw films as a possible source for foreign revenue. As a result, low-budget Indonesian exploitation films were produced and exported to international markets. The most successful films in overseas markets were generally produced by any one of three studios: Rapi Films, Parkit, or Soraya Intercine Films. Mystics in Bali was directed by Tjut Djalil, a newspaper reporter and short story author who became attached to the film after learning of Leák Ngakak by Putra Mada—a novel about Balinese black magic upon which the film is based—from a producer friend.

As with its source novel, Mystics in Bali draws from elements of Southeast Asian folklore and Balinese mythology, incorporating the mythological Leyak, which take the form of a flying, disembodied head with entrails and internal organs still connected and hanging down from the neck. There are variations of this legend among different cultures, with it being known as a penanggalan in the Malay Peninsula and a krasue in various countries in Mainland Southeast Asia, such as Thailand, Cambodia and Laos.

The film's lead, Ilona Agathe Bastian, was not an actress prior to the film's production. Rather, she was a German tourist visiting Bali who was chosen by the wife of one of the film's producers to portray Cathy. Filming took place on the Indonesian island of Java rather than on location in Bali, as Hindu locals were too superstitious to allow the black magic rituals shown in the film to be performed there.

== Release ==
=== Home media ===
Mystics in Bali was not widely released on VHS, being distributed only to Indonesian and Japanese markets. In October 2007, the film was released on DVD by Mondo Macabro.

=== Specialty screenings ===
On 16 October and 7 November, Mystics in Bali screened at the Alamo Drafthouse Cinema in South Lamar, Austin, Texas, where it was presented in "Foleyvision", with live dubbing and sound effects provided by Foley artists.

In 2016, the Alamo Drafthouse in South Lamar offered a free double feature screening of Day of Wrath (1943) and Mystics in Bali, in preparation for the release of The VVitch.

== Critical reception ==
In 2007, Stuart Galbraith IV of DVD Talk called Mystics in Bali "a landmark of Indonesian horror", but noted that the film "isn't as daffily entertaining as Mondo's other Indonesian titles, notably Lady Terminator and Virgins from Hell, though it has its moments". John Beifuss of the Star Tribune called Mystics in Bali "a must-see for fans of bizarre, imaginative world cinema."

== See also ==
- Balinese topeng dance – a form of Indonesian dance involving the use of masks
- Krasue – a spirit in Southeast Asian folklore manifesting as a disembodied head with entrails attached
- Manananggal – a vampire-like creature in Filipino folklore
- Mythology of Indonesia – the collected myths and legends of Indonesia
- Rangda – the queen of the Leyaks in Balinese mythology
