= Josh Hasty =

American entrepreneur and filmmaker (born 1987)

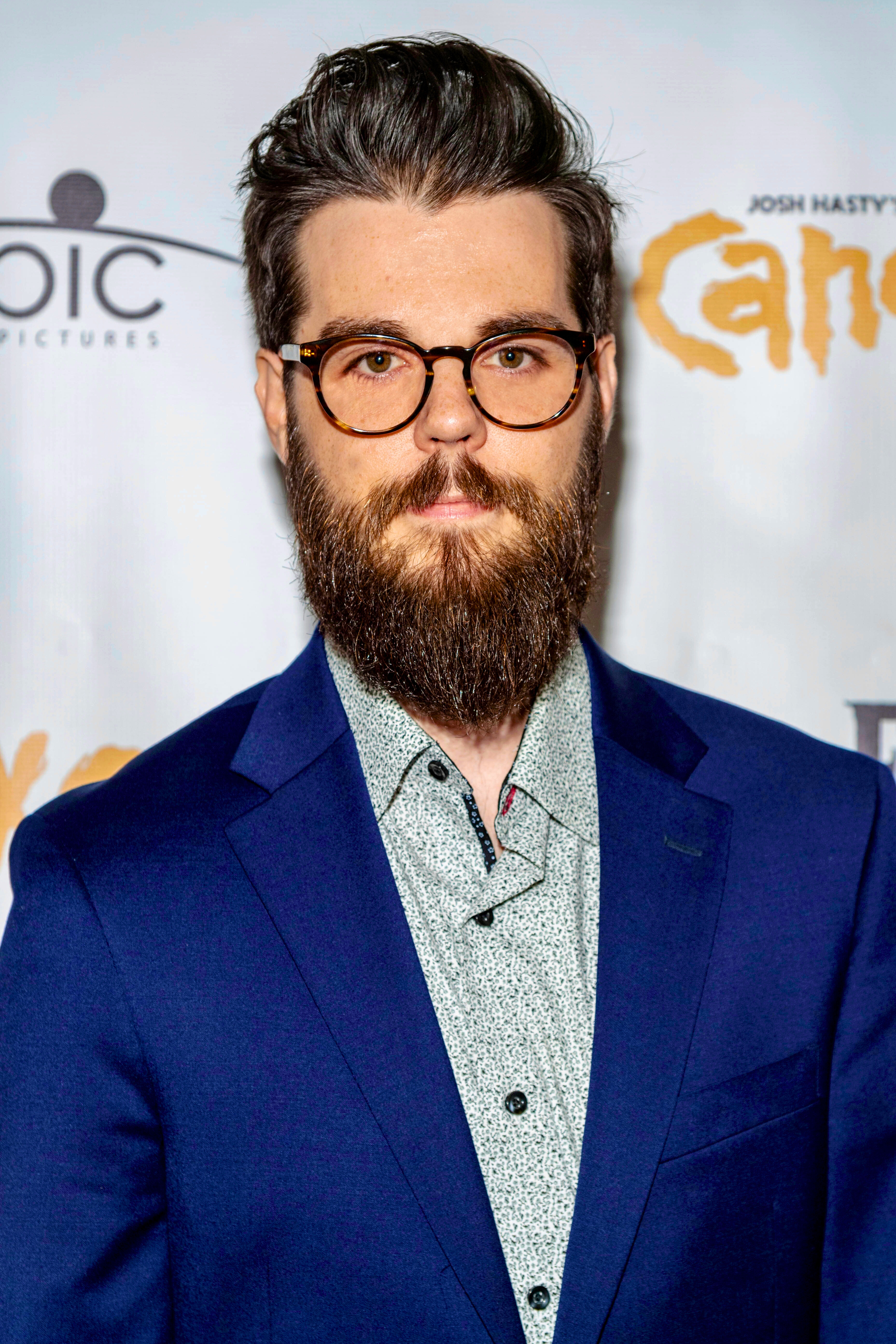
- Hasty in 2019
- Born: Cincinnati, Ohio, U.S.
- Occupations: Filmmaker; entrepreneur
- Years active: 2015 - Present
- Website: joshhasty.com

Josh Hasty is an American filmmaker and entrepreneur. He is the creative director and executive producer at Relavox, a creative production studio he founded with his wife, Lindsey Kowalski. Hasty has worked in the horror entertainment industry, creating immersive seasonal attractions, collaborating with Rob Zombie, and writing and directing the film Candy Corn.

Josh Hasty has been quoted regarding the importance of creating high-quality, audience-focused content, even during industry disruptions, and advocates for innovation beyond traditional media hubs. He advocates for mental health in the media and entertainment industries and hosted weekly meditation sessions with the David Lynch Foundation for creatives worldwide from 2020-2024.

== Early life ==
Josh Hasty was born and raised in Cincinnati, Ohio. He grew up aspiring to have a career in entertainment and media.

== Career ==
=== 2012–2014: Early career ===
Hasty’s career began in the independent horror film and entertainment industries. In 2012, he opened Scaredown, a seasonal Halloween event in Waynesville, Ohio, combining haunted attractions with live performances. In 2013, Hasty started a freelance career in video production. He worked with tech startups, real estate firms, and public speakers, using the moniker Relavox.

During this time, Hasty began making independent films. Without funding or resources, Hasty would handle most aspects of production, including making wardrobes and props, set design, operating the camera, music, and editing. These projects include A Mannequin in Static, Judith: The Night She Stayed Home, and Honeyspider. Judith: The Night She Stayed Home is a tribute to John Carpenter’s Halloween and was shot at The Myers House North Carolina, a life-size replica of Michael Myers's house from the film. Honeyspider was released by Brain Damage Films on DVD and streaming and won the award for Best Horror Film at Mad Monster Party.

In 2015, Rob Zombie hired Hasty to co-produce, direct, shoot, and edit a feature-length documentary about the making of Zombie's film, 31. The documentary, In Hell Everybody Loves Popcorn, was included in the Blu-ray and distributed digitally through Lionsgate. An exclusive 4+ hour version of the documentary was released on iTunes. A condensed version of the documentary screened alongside the film as part of a one-night theatrical release through Fathom Events.

In 2016, Hasty began production on his next feature film, Candy Corn, which he wrote, directed, produced, and co-composed. Production cost $250,000. The film’s cast includes Tony Todd, P.J. Soles, and Courtney Gains. P.J. Soles stated that she came out of retirement to be in Candy Corn after a phone call with Hasty, and working with him reminded her of working with John Carpenter. Entertainment Weekly released the exclusive first look at the film. Epic Pictures acquired Candy Corn for worldwide distribution. The film was released in the U.S. by Dread and Sony Pictures Home Entertainment internationally. Hasty co-composed the film's score, which was pressed on vinyl at Abbey Road Studios and released by Burning Witches Records. In 2023, Fangoria named Candy Corn as one of their favorite horror movies taking place on Halloween.

=== 2020–present: Recent work ===
In a 2019 interview with the Transcendental Meditation Blog, Hasty explained how meditation had become a vital tool for his mental wellbeing, stating, "It's this little sidekick that goes in and clears the clutter from my brain." In 2020, Hasty partnered with the David Lynch Foundation in Los Angeles to host weekly mediations for creatives worldwide struggling with mental health issues due to the COVID-19 pandemic. In August 2020, Josh Hasty was hospitalized with a lung infections. Hasty said this experience changed his perspective on life and inspired him to create work that promoted positive change and mental and physical health. In 2021, Hasty produced an educational film project with South African psychologist Susan David.

== Personal life ==
He currently lives in Ohio with his wife, Lindsey Hasty, who is also co-founder of Relavox.
