= Andy Starke =

British film and television producer

- Born: Andrew Starke
- Occupations: Film producer; television producer
- Years active: 1999–present
- Known for: Co-founder of Mondo Macabro, Boum Productions and Rook Films

Andrew Starke is a British film and television producer who co-founded the production company Rook Films in 2008 with director Ben Wheatley and screenwriter Amy Jump.

== Career ==
In association with Rook Films, Starke served as producer on such films as Kill List (2011), The Duke of Burgundy (2014), The Greasy Strangler, Free Fire (both 2016), An Evening with Beverly Luff Linn, In Fabric, Happy New Year, Colin Burstead (all 2018), and Possessor (2020). In 2019, Starke co-founded the film distribution company Anti-Worlds with Jason Wood, Zoe Flower, Sam Dunn and John Morrissey.

In 2001, Starke co-wrote, co-produced and co-directed the Channel 4 TV programme Mondo Macabro alongside Pete Tombs. The duo went on to found the American-based home video distribution label Mondo Macabro in 2002. Starke and Tombs also founded the production company Boum Productions.
