= Advent Bangun =

Indonesian karateka and actor (1952–2018)

- Born: Advani Rangua; 12 October 1952; Kabanjahe, North Sumatra, Indonesia
- Died: 10 February 2018 (aged 65); Jakarta, Indonesia
- Other name: Yohanes Thomas Advent Bangun
- Occupations: Pastor & Christian activist Former film actor & karateka
- Years active: 1976–2001 (as actor)

Advent Bangun (born Advani Rangua; 12 October 1952 – 10 February 2018) was a 12-time Indonesian karateka champion. He gave up his career in karate pursue a career in cinema. He died on 10 February 2018, due to diabetes.

== Life and career ==
Bangun (Rangua) became the national champion in karate in 1971 and represented Indonesia at the international level. He began his acting career in the mid-1970s, mainly due to fame and success achieved in martial arts. He appeared in many action films. After his acting career, Bangun became a pastor under the name Thomas Bangun and consequently came into prominence as a Christian activist.

== Filmography ==
=== Television ===
- Singgasana Brama Kumbara (1996)
- Sapu jagad (2000) as Tiger

=== Film ===
- Rajawali Sakti (1976)
- Dua Pendekar Pembelah Langit (1977)
- Krakatau (1977) as Bodyguard
- Ken arok – Ken dedes (1983) as Tunggul Ametung
- Si Buta Lawan Jaka Sembung (1983)
- Mawar berbisa (1984)
- Golok setan (1984) as Banyujaga
- Gadis berwajah seribu (1984)
- No Time to Die (1984) as Handoko
- Si buta dari gua hantu (1985)
- Residivis (1985)
- Putri duyung (1985)
- Noda X (1985)
- Komando samber nyawa (1985)
- Gantian dong (1985)
- Darah perjaka (1985)
- Carok (1985)
- Petualangan cinta nyi blorong (1986)
- Menumpas teroris (1986)
- Langganan (1986)
- Siluman srigala putih (1987)
- Pendekar bukit tengkorak (1987)
- Neraka perut bumi (1987)
- Kelabang seribu (1987)
- Siluman kera (1988)
- Pendekar ksatria (1988)
- Mandala penakluk satria tar tar (1988)
- Malaikat bayangan (1988)
- Bangkitnya Si Mata Malaikat (1988)
- Si pahit lidah dans si mata empat (1989)
- Pembalasan si mata elang (1989) as Mata Elang
- Buronan (1989)
- Lady Dragon (1990) as Ringo
- Stone Age Warriors (1991)
- Without Mercy (1995) as Tomo
