= Black Jesus (TV series) =

American live-action television sitcom

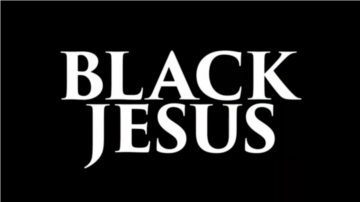
- Genre: Sitcom
- Created by: Aaron McGruder; Mike Clattenburg
- Starring: Gerald "Slink" Johnson; Charlie Murphy; John Witherspoon; Kali Hawk; Corey Holcomb; Andra Fuller; Andrew Bachelor; Angela E. Gibbs; Antwon Tanner; Valenzia Algarin; Dominique
- Composer: Jonathan "Jon" Jackson
- Country of origin: United States
- Original language: English
- No. of seasons: 3
- No. of episodes: 31

Production
- Executive producers: Aaron McGruder; Mike Clattenburg (seasons 1–2); Rusty Cundieff (season 3); Robert Wise; Meghann Collins Robertson; Norm Aladjem; John Bravakis; Stu Schreiberg (seasons 1–2); Keith Crofford (Note: Crofford and Newman are executive producers for Williams Street.); Walter Newman
- Producers: Mark Costa (Note: Costa is producer for Williams Street); Debbie Hayn Cass (seasons 1–2); Kyle Clark (season 3); Slink Johnson (Note: Slink Johnson is credited as co-producer)
- Editor: Jean Crupper (season 3)
- Running time: 20 minutes
- Production companies: 5 Mutts; Triage Entertainment; Mainstay Entertainment (season 3); Williams Street

Original release
- Network: Adult Swim
- Release: August 7, 2014 – November 30, 2019

Black Jesus is an American live-action sitcom created by Aaron McGruder and Mike Clattenburg that aired on Adult Swim. The series stars Gerald "Slink" Johnson, Charlie Murphy, Corey Holcomb, Kali Hawk, King Bach, Andra Fuller, and John Witherspoon. The series premiered on August 7, 2014. On December 10, 2014, the series was renewed for a second season, which premiered on September 18, 2015. Its third and final season premiered on September 21, 2019.

== Premise ==
The scripted live-action comedy features Jesus Christ living in modern-day Compton, California, on a mission to spread love and kindness throughout the neighborhood with his small group of followers.

== Cast ==
- Gerald "Slink" Johnson as Jesus Christ
- Charlie Murphy as Victor "Vic" Hargrove (seasons 1–2)
- John Witherspoon as Lloyd Hamilton
- Kali Hawk as Maggie (seasons 1–2)
- Corey Holcomb as Boonie
- Andra Fuller as Fish (seasons 1–2)
- Andrew Bachelor as Trayvon (seasons 1–2)
- Angela E. Gibbs as Ms. Tudi
- Antwon Tanner as Jason (main seasons 1–2; recurring season 3)
- Valenzia Algarin as Dianne (main seasons 1–2; recurring season 3)
- Dominique as Shalinka (recurring seasons 1–2; regular season 3)
- Jamar Malachi Neighbors as Ambro

== Episodes ==
=== Series overview ===
Season	Episodes	Originally released	
Season	Episodes	First released	Last released
1	10	August 7, 2014	October 9, 2014
2	11	September 18, 2015	November 27, 2015
3	10	September 21, 2019	November 30, 2019

=== Season 1 (2014) ===
No. overall	No. in season	Title	Directed by	Written by	Original release date	US viewers (millions)
1	1	"Smokin', Drinkin', and Chillin'"	Mike Clattenburg	Aaron McGruder & Mike Clattenburg	August 7, 2014	2.047
When Jesus and his "homies" fail to buy some marijuana, they decide to grow it in a neighborhood garden.
2	2	"Fish and the Con Man"	Mike Clattenburg	Mike Clattenburg & Aaron McGruder	August 14, 2014	1.907
Jesus and the crew find their garden but get into trouble with the local Mexican gang, who demands money from them.
3	3	"The Shit Heist"	Mike Clattenburg	Aaron McGruder & Mike Clattenburg	August 21, 2014	1.843
The gang is out of money after paying off the Mexican gangsters, so they steal some manure from a boarding stable.
4	4	"I Gave at the Playground"	Mike Clattenburg	Mike Clattenburg & Aaron McGruder	August 28, 2014	1.439
The gang holds a yard sale to help Boonie pay his child support.
5	5	"Fried Green Tomatoes"	Mike Clattenburg	Aaron McGruder & Mike Clattenburg	September 4, 2014	1.499
The gang's weed plants fail to grow, but the garden is full of tomatoes.
6	6	"Love Thy Enemy, Part 1"	Mike Clattenburg	Mike Clattenburg & Aaron McGruder	September 11, 2014	1.598
The crew start producing a green tomato sauce.
7	7	"The Other Shoe Drops"	Mike Clattenburg	Aaron McGruder & Mike Clattenburg	September 18, 2014	1.515
Trayvon discovers someone has been pouring bleach into the garden.
8	8	"Love Thy Enemy, Part 2"	Mike Clattenburg	Aaron McGruder & Mike Clattenburg	September 25, 2014	1.497
Vic and Lloyd's work leads to problems at the complex.
9	9	"Gangsta's Paradise"	Mike Clattenburg	Aaron McGruder & Mike Clattenburg	October 2, 2014	1.560
The gang stages an online benefit concert.
10	10	"WTFWBJD"	Mike Clattenburg	Aaron McGruder & Mike Clattenburg	October 9, 2014	1.709
While Jesus is on the run from authorities, Fish tries to lead the gang so they can keep the garden. Meanwhile, Lloyd sues Vic.

=== Season 2 (2015) ===
No. overall	No. in season	Title	Directed by	Written by	Original release date	US viewers (millions)
11	1	"No Room for Jesus"	Mike Clattenburg	Aaron McGruder & Mike Clattenburg	September 18, 2015	1.168
Jesus returns from the mental hospital, and is concerned about Fish, who may have taken part in criminal activities.
12	2	"Jesus Gonna Get His"	Mike Clattenburg	Aaron McGruder & Mike Clattenburg	September 25, 2015	1.209
The gang fights the corrupt preacher of the Church of Jesus Christ in Compton.
13	3	"False Witness"	Mike Clattenburg	Aaron McGruder & Mike Clattenburg	October 2, 2015	1.278
Vic thinks the gang has committed a terrorist act.
14	4	"Hands of God"	Mike Clattenburg	Aaron McGruder & Mike Clattenburg	October 9, 2015	1.148
Jesus and Ms. Tudi raise money by offering holy foot massages. Tudi thinks Fish's "gift of sexiness" might raise more money.
15	5	"Tasty Tudi's"	Mike Clattenburg	Aaron McGruder & Mike Clattenburg	October 16, 2015	1.279
Fish obtains a no-limit EBT card from a city employee.
16	6	"Taco Sundays"	Mike Clattenburg	Aaron McGruder & Mike Clattenburg	October 23, 2015	1.158
The gang sells fish tacos from a food truck. Jesus loses his phone.
17	7	"Thy Neighbor's Strife"	Mike Clattenburg	Aaron McGruder & Mike Clattenburg	October 30, 2015	1.064
Vic is attracted to Lloyd's wife. Meanwhile, the gang shoots a music video.
18	8	"Never Say When"	Mike Clattenburg	Aaron McGruder & Mike Clattenburg	November 6, 2015	1.201
Lloyd gets a job advertising liquor.
19	9	"Janky Cable"	Mike Clattenburg	Aaron McGruder & Mike Clattenburg	November 13, 2015	1.140
Vic tries to ruin the gang's opportunity to watch the big fight on free cable.
20	10	"Good for Nothing"	Mike Clattenburg	Aaron McGruder & Mike Clattenburg	November 20, 2015	1.019
Lloyd's wife wants a divorce.
21	11	"A Very Special Christmas In Compton"	Mike Clattenburg	Aaron McGruder & Mike Clattenburg	November 27, 2015	1.099
Jesus makes a Christmas wish to no longer be divine.

=== Season 3 (2019) ===
No. overall	No. in season	Title	Directed by	Written by	Original release date	US viewers (millions)
22	1	"The Compton Carter"	Dale Stern	Story by : Aaron McGruder; Teleplay by : Aaron McGruder and Rusty Cundieff	September 21, 2019	0.445
Jesus returns from jail to discover his running buddy Boonie has relocated from their old Compton Gardens apartment complex to the "New" Compton Gardens, where Lloyd is building manager.
23	2	"Vatican Guys"	Rusty Cundieff	Story by : Aaron McGruder; Teleplay by : Aaron McGruder and Rusty Cundieff	September 28, 2019	0.445
After discovering the leaked video of Jesus performing a miracle, the Vatican sends two secret Vatican agents from Italy to Compton to kidnap "the Black Jesus" and determine if this oversized black guy is really the Son of God.
24	3	"Parole Officer"	Tina Mabry	Story by : Aaron McGruder and Mike Clattenburg; Teleplay by : Aaron McGruder	October 5, 2019	0.657
The parole officer for Jesus, a friendly white dude that just wants to make the world a better place, witnesses proof of Jesus' divinity, has a spiritual upheaval and decides to stop going to work and follow Jesus.
25	4	"Operation SHUT'EMDOWN"	Tina Mabry	Story by : Aaron McGruder and Mike Clattenburg; Teleplay by : Aaron McGruder and Rusty Cundieff	October 19, 2019	0.622
AmBro, the head of security at The New Compton Gardens, has formed a militia to scare off drug dealers in the hood. In a show of force, his troops take over the street for a day, which screws up a drug deal the gang planned for that day.
26	5	"Boonie Christ"	Rusty Cundieff	Rusty Cundieff	October 26, 2019	0.655
Jesus lets Boonie have the power of Christ so he can see how difficult being the Son of God really is. While Boonie is trying to figure out how to make his new powers work for him, Jesus takes a skip day for himself.
27	6	"The Compton Crusader"	Luke Matheny	Story by : Aaron McGruder and Mike Clattenburg; Teleplay by : Aaron McGruder	November 2, 2019	0.545
There's a vigilante in Southwest Compton, and he's taken matters into his own hands. Jesus has to stop him before he goes too far.
28	7	"Hair Tudi"	Heath Cullens	Alyson Fouse	November 9, 2019	0.551
Ms. Tudi miraculously scores a small business loan, and now she can open "Tudi's Wigs, Weaves, and Whatnots". The Korean Bitch Mafia isn't happy the store is on their turf, and that means war.
29	8	"Boonie Comes Up"	Heath Cullens	Story by : Hugh Moore; Teleplay by : Hugh Moore and Rusty Cundieff	November 16, 2019	0.487
Boonie thinks he has been possessed by the soul of a dead gangster and begins acting like a serious badass. That day, Lloyd serves Jesus papers - he's taking him to "Homie's Court" for making him sober, and to settle up for $600.
30	9	"God's Team"	Luke Matheny	Story by : Robert Eric Wise, Christopher Powell and Chip Hall; Teleplay by : Christopher Powell and Chip Hall	November 23, 2019	0.572
Jesus suddenly finds himself as the coach for the Compton Devils junior high football team. His agenda to spread love and kindness is at odd with winning at all costs, and we see his struggle play out in the big game.
31	10	"The Real Jesus of Compton"	Dale Stern	Rusty Cundieff	November 30, 2019	0.525
The gang talks Jesus into starring in a variety show after a sleazy producer promises them fame and fortune. It's a disaster from start to finish, but Jesus is determined to get Pop's good word out as a result.

== International broadcast ==
The series premiered in Australia on June 8, 2015, on The Comedy Channel, and in Canada on April 1, 2019, on Adult Swim.

== Reception ==
At Metacritic, which assigns a normalized rating out of 100 to reviews from critics, the first season received an average score of 73, which indicates "generally positive reviews", based on five reviews. Brian Lowry of Variety gave the series a positive review, saying: "Black Jesus is funny in part because it ventures so eagerly into areas most producers and networks, worn down by years of calls for sponsor boycotts and bad publicity, have simply decided it’s easier to avoid." Robert Lloyd of the Los Angeles Times gave the series a positive review, saying: "I'm not saying it's particularly deep, and it is filled with language that cannot be reproduced in this newspaper, but it's good-natured and, compared with a lot of what's on television, the comedy is gentle and hopeful." Soraya Nadia McDonald of The Washington Post said: "Like his earthly counterparts, Black Jesus doesn’t have a perfect track record, but he gets the big concepts and leads by example. If anything, it seems McGruder is trying to tell his audience that if Jesus is just like us, maybe it’s not so much of a stretch for us to be just like him." James Poniewozik of Time stated: "You might expect McGruder, given his Boondocks history, to be out for pointed religious satire, but Black Jesus is really more of a stoner hangout comedy with a heart."

As the series shows Jesus using several curse words, smoking marijuana, and drinking alcoholic beverages, several pastors called for its removal from broadcasting.
