= Killing in Istanbul =

- Directed by: Yılmaz Atadeniz
- Written by: Çetin İnanç (screenplay) (uncredited)
- Produced by: Yılmaz Atadeniz (producer)
- Cinematography: Rafet Siriner
- Edited by: Mustafa Kent
- Music by: Necip Sarıcıoğlu
- Release date: 1967
- Running time: 71 minutes
- Country: Turkey
- Language: Turkish

Killing in Istanbul (originally Kilink İstanbul'da) is a 1967 Turkish fantasy adventure superhero film directed by Yılmaz Atadeniz, and based on the Italian comic book character, Killing.

== Cast ==
- İrfan Atasoy as Orhan "Uçan Adam"
- Pervin Par as Gül
- Muzaffer Tema as Prof. Cemil
- Yıldırım Gencer as Kilink (uncredited)
- Suzan Avci as Kilink's Lover
- Hüseyin Peyda as Police chief
- Sevinç Pekin
- Mine Soley as Professor's secretary
- Ergun Köknar
- Feridun Çölgeçen as Prof. Maxwell
- Hüseyin Zan as Oski
- Mete Mert
- Enver Dönmez
- Muammer Gözalan as Prof. Houloussi
