= Elizabeth De Razzo =

American actress

- Born: Elizabeth Rodriguez
- Occupation: Actress
- Years active: 2005–present

Elizabeth De Razzo (née Rodriguez) is an American actress. She is best known for her recurring role as Maria in the sports comedy television series Eastbound & Down.

== Career ==
Her first on-screen appearance was a role as Shirley in the episode "The Promise" of CBS's police procedural television series Cold Case. She also had roles in television series ER, United States of Tara and Southland. In 2010, she was cast as Maria for the second season of sports comedy television series Eastbound & Down. In the third season of Eastbound & Down, she was credited with the main cast. De Razzo's film credits include The 33 (2015), The Greasy Strangler (2016) and Lemon (2017).

== Filmography ==
Film roles
Year	Title	Role	Notes
2014	Market Hours	Female Guard	Short film
2015	The 33	Susana Valenzuela	
2016	The Greasy Strangler	Janet	
2017	Lemon	Rosa	
2018	A Boy Called Sailboat	Meyo	
2018	Frat Pack	Fatima	
2018	Unimundo 45	Luna Grande	Short film
2018	818	Rosa	

Television roles
Year	Title	Role	Notes
2005	Cold Case	Shirley	Episode: "The Promise"
2007	ER	Woman	Episode: "Lights Out"
2009	United States of Tara	Angry Server	Episode: "Abundance"
2010	Southland	Girlfriend	Episode: "The Runner"
2010–13	Eastbound & Down	Maria	20 episodes
2014	Lemonade Stand	Stacey Molina	Episode: "Material Girls"
2014–16	Idiotsitter	Joy	11 episodes
2018	Vida	Yoli	4 episodes
