= Jim Hosking =

British film director

Jim Hosking is a British film director. His first feature film The Greasy Strangler premiered at the Sundance Film Festival on 22 January 2016. It went on to win The Discovery Award at the British Independent Film Awards 2016. It also won Best Comedy at the Empire Film Awards 2017.

His second feature film An Evening with Beverly Luff Linn premiered at the Sundance Film Festival on 20 January 2018.

Hosking co-wrote and directed the show Tropical Cop Tales, which premiered on 1 February 2019 on Adult Swim in the US.

== Filmography ==
Short film

Year	Title	Director	Writer	Composer	Notes
2003	Little Clumps of Hair	Yes	Yes	Yes	
2006	Work	Yes	Yes	No	
2008	The Importance of Awards in Advertising: A Talk by Maximillian Villivankk.	Yes	Yes	Yes	
2010	Renegades	Yes	Yes	Yes	
2010	Crabs	Yes	Yes	No	
2014	G is for Grandad	Yes	Yes	No	Segment of ABCs of Death 2

Feature film

Year	Title	Director	Writer	Producer	Executive Producer
2016	The Greasy Strangler	Yes	Yes	No	Yes
2018	An Evening with Beverly Luff Linn	Yes	Yes	No	Yes
2024	Ebony & Ivory	Yes	Yes	Yes	No

Television

Year	Title	Director	Writer	Executive Producer	Creator
2018–2019	Tropical Cop Tales	Yes	Yes	Yes	Yes
