= Chintami Atmanagara =

Indonesian singer and actress

- Born: Bonn, Germany
- Occupations: Actress; singer; entrepreneur
- Years active: 1979–present

Chintami Atmanagara is an Indonesian actress, singer and entrepreneur.

== Biography ==
Atmanagara made her acting debut in the 1979 film Tempatmu di Sisiku, and also appeared in Satan's Bed (1986) and Rumah Pondok Indah (2006). She is the younger sister of Minati Atmanagara.

She released her debut studio album Cintaku Cintamu in 1982. Her 1992 album Nyanyian Hati received the Best Interpretation Artist Award at the 1994 Indonesian Music Video Awards.

== Selected discography ==
- Cintaku Cintamu (1982)
- Duri dalam Dada (1984)
- Nyanyian Hait (1992)
- Biar Sepi Menyanyi (1996)
