= Jaka Železnikar =

Slovenian artist (born 1971)

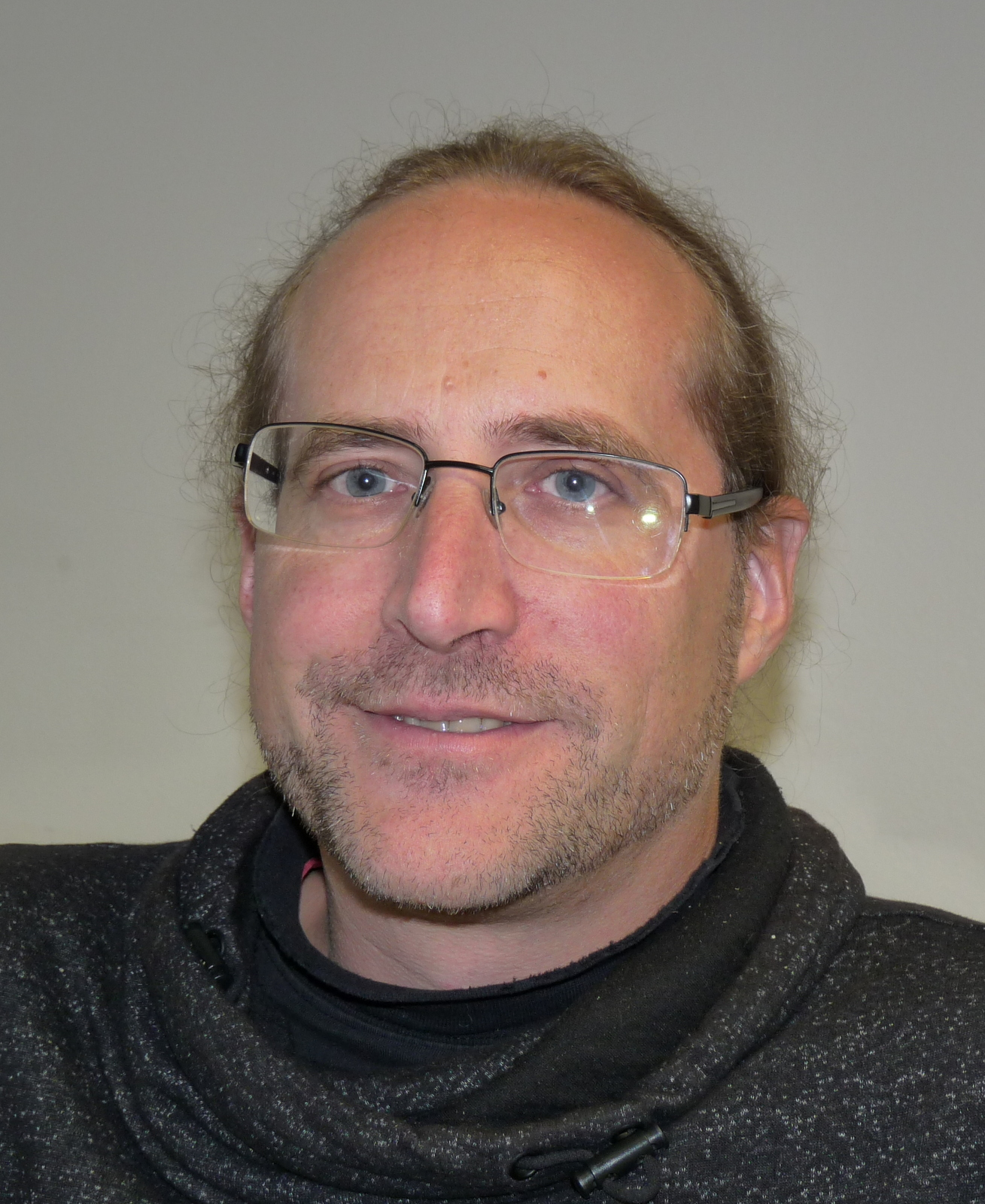
Jaka Železnikar

Jaka Železnikar (born 1971) is a Slovenian artist known for his computational poetry and internet art. The base of his work is a nonlinear language-based expression combined with visual art. Since 1997 he has been part of the net art community, and since 2004 he has created several expressive add-ons for the Firefox browser.

== Life ==
Železnikar was born in 1971 in Ljubljana, Slovenia.

== Work ==
His works are mostly bilingual (Slovene and English).

Železnikar has created about 25 net art works. Notable works include Interactivalia, a 1997 interactive poetry work in Slovenian and English and "Ascii Kosovel", mix of nonlinear poetic interactive or computational narratives based on a work by Srečko Kosovel, Slovenian avantgard poet (1904-1926).

His 2002 work "Poems for Echelon was a computer-based interactive work that invited users to send emails to the program itself. In doing so, the users participated in the production of poems that were designed to confuse ECHELON, a US Intelligence gathering system.

Since 2004 he has created several expressive add-ons for the Firefox web browser, including the on-line visual poem "Letters · 字母 2.0" and "Disorganizer", made in 2007.
