= Yılmaz Atadeniz =

Turkish film director (1932–2023)

- Born: 1 February 1932; Istanbul, Turkey
- Died: 13 December 2023 (aged 91); Sarıyer, Istanbul, Turkey
- Resting place: Aşiyan Asri Cemetery
- Occupation: Film director
- Years active: 1952–2015

Yılmaz Atadeniz (1 February 1932 – 13 December 2023) was a Turkish film director, producer, and screenwriter. He directed 80 films between 1963 and 1997. Atadeniz died from COVID-19 in Sarıyer, on 13 December 2023, at the age of 91. He was buried at Aşiyan Asri Cemetery.

== Selected filmography ==
- Killing in Istanbul (1967)
- The Deathless Devil (1972)
- A Season in Hakkari (1983)
