= Candy Corn (film) =

- Promotional release poster
- Directed by: Josh Hasty
- Written by: Josh Hasty
- Produced by: Courtney Gains; Matt O'Neill
- Starring: Courtney Gains; Pancho Moler; P. J. Soles; Tony Todd
- Release date: September 13, 2019 (limited)
- Running time: 85 minutes
- Country: United States
- Language: English

Candy Corn is a 2019 American horror film written and directed by Josh Hasty and starring Courtney Gains, Pancho Moler, P. J. Soles and Tony Todd. In addition to acting in the film, Gains and Todd served as producer and executive producer respectively.

== Plot ==
On Halloween weekend, a group of bullies are planning their annual hazing on local outcast Jacob Atkins. When they take things too far, he is resurrected to seek revenge against those who wronged him.

== Cast ==
- Tony Todd as Bishop Gate
- P. J. Soles as Marcy Taylor
- Courtney Gains as Sheriff Sam Bramford
- Pancho Moler as Lester
- Sky Elobar as Gus
- Caleb Thomas as Bobby
- Madison Russ as Carol
- Cy Creamer as Steve
- Jimothy Beckholt
- Nate Chaney as Jacob Atkins
- Patrick Ryan as Deputy Fox
- Justin Mabry as Deputy Conrad
- Matt O’Neill
- Jaime Gallagher as Shirley

== Release ==
The film was released in limited theaters on September 13, 2019. It was released on video-on-demand (VOD) and Blu-ray on September 17, 2019.

== Reception ==
The film has a 67% rating on Rotten Tomatoes based on seven reviews. Lorry Kitka of Film Threat gave it a 6 out of 10.

== See also ==
- List of films set around Halloween
