= Immoral Tales (book) =

1994 book by Cathal Tohill and Pete Tombs

Immoral Tales: Sex and Horror Cinema in Europe 1956–1984
- First edition cover
- Author: Cathal Tohill; Pete Tombs
- Language: English
- Subject: Exploitation cinema, horror cinema
- Publisher: Primitive Press
- Publication date: 1994
- Publication place: United Kingdom
- Media type: Print
- OCLC: 778974000

Immoral Tales: Sex and Horror Cinema in Europe 1956–1984 is a 1994 non-fiction book by Cathal Tohill and Pete Tombs, that won the Bram Stoker Award for Best Non-Fiction. The book covers European exploitation cinema with profiles of Jesús Franco, José Larraz, Alain Robbe-Grillet, Jean Rollin, Walerian Borowczyk and Jose Bénazéraf. It is notable for being one of the few books to concentrate solely on the sex/horror subgenre of cinema.

== Reception ==
In his review of the book for the Vancouver Sun, Mark Harris characterized Tohill and Tombs as having a "truly encyclopedic" knowledge of European cinema, with a predilection against more acclaimed or accessible filmmakers such as Dario Argento: "Implicitly contemptous of status and names, Tohill and Tombs are clearly most fond of Jean Rollin and Jess Franco, the filmmakers who have been treated most cruelly by the industry and the press." Harris continues: "In the name of the living image, Tohill and Tombs are willing to forgive a maverick filmmaker almost anything. [...] they seek beauty wherever it may be found–even if that wherever happens to be a Gothic dungeon overseen by naked nymphomaniacs."

== Editions ==
- Immoral Tales: Sex and Horror Cinema in Europe, 1956–1984, published by Primitive Press in 1994. ISBN 978-0-9524141-0-0.
- Immoral Tales: Sex and Horror Cinema in Europe, 1956–1984, published by Titan Books in 1995. ISBN 978-1-85286-661-7.
- Immoral tales: European Sex & Horror Movies 1956–1984 (U.S. edition), published by St. Martin's Griffin in September 1995. ISBN 978-0-312-13519-5.

== See also ==
- Mondo Macabro (book), a 1997 follow-up by Tombs
