= The Greasy Strangler =

- Theatrical release poster
- Directed by: Jim Hosking
- Written by: Toby Harvard; Jim Hosking
- Produced by: Daniel Noah; Andy Starke; Ant Timpson; Josh C. Waller; Elijah Wood
- Starring: Michael St. Michaels; Sky Elobar; Elizabeth De Razzo; Gil Gex; Abdoulaye NGom; Holland MacFallister
- Cinematography: Mårten Tedin
- Edited by: Mark Burnett
- Music by: Andrew Hung
- Production companies: Drafthouse Films; Rook Films; SpectreVision; Timpson Films
- Distributed by: FilmRise
- Release dates: January 22, 2016 (Sundance); October 7, 2016 (United States)
- Running time: 93 minutes
- Country: United States
- Language: English
- Box office: $45,878

The Greasy Strangler is a 2016 American absurdist black comedy horror film directed by Jim Hosking, and written by Hosking and Toby Harvard. The film stars Michael St. Michaels, Sky Elobar, Elizabeth De Razzo, Gil Gex, Abdoulaye NGom and Holland MacFallister. The film was released on October 7, 2016, by FilmRise.

== Plot ==
Ronnie, a pathological liar who fabricates stories about disco groups like the Bee Gees, runs a disco-themed walking location tour in his town, alongside his son Brayden, who aspires to be a space fantasy author. Ronnie allows Brayden to live with him on the condition that Brayden prepares excessively greasy food for him. Ronnie asserts that Brayden drove his mother away, though truthfully, she left Ronnie for a fitness expert named Ricky Prickles.

At night, Ronnie completely covers himself in grease and strangles residents of the town, soon becoming dubbed "The Greasy Strangler". After his killings, he cleans himself of the grease by standing in a car wash run by a blind man named Paul. During one of the walking tours, Brayden meets a woman named Janet, and they begin a romantic relationship. One night, Ronnie strangles a hot dog vendor he had gotten in an argument with earlier, causing his eyes to pop out of his head, which Ronnie cooks and eats.

One night, Brayden and Janet have sex. Ronnie attempts to seduce her the next morning before killing Oinker, Brayden's best friend. He later takes Janet out to a discotheque, threatening to evict Brayden if he does not allow him to. There, Ronnie attempts to kiss Janet, but she resists, saying that she may be in love with Brayden. Despite this, the pair have sex and mock Brayden when he runs from the house in despair. This later leads to a heated argument between Ronnie and Brayden.

Brayden later professes his love to Janet, and they reconcile. Ronnie overhears this before going to the car wash to strangle and decapitate Paul. The next morning, Brayden calls a detective named Jody and reports that Ronnie may be the Greasy Strangler. Jody—who is actually Ronnie in disguise—visits the house the next day, and Brayden and Janet show him a spot of oil left behind on the carpet as evidence that Ronnie is the Greasy Strangler. Jody concludes that the oil is meaningless circumstantial evidence, and demands that they end all inquiries about Ronnie having committed the murders.

That night, Janet declares her mutual love for Brayden, and they decide to get married. Ronnie, hiding under the bed, reveals himself, claiming Janet as his lover and evicting Brayden. Janet replies that Brayden can live with her. Ronnie covers himself in grease, slaps Brayden, and drags Janet out of the house with him. Brayden covers himself in grease as well and follows the two to a movie theatre, where Ronnie is strangling Janet. Brayden, upon seeing this, opts to strangle Janet instead. Janet's eyes pop out of her head, which both he and Ronnie consume while watching the movie.

The next day, Ronnie and Brayden go to a beach. Ronnie admits that he cares for Brayden despite his annoyance with him, and they bond over, in hindsight, their disgust with Janet. They cover themselves in grease and head to a forest where they murder Ricky Prickles. In a surreal turn of events, they then witness themselves being executed by firing squad, watching as confetti and champagne explode from their heads. They venture deeper into the forest, still covered in grease, and primally shake wooden spears at the camera.

== Cast ==
- Michael St. Michaels as Big Ronnie
- Sky Elobar as Big Brayden
- Elizabeth De Razzo as Janet
- Gil Gex as Big Paul
- Joe David Walters as Oinker
- Sam Dissanayake as Indian Tourist
- Abdoulaye N'Gom as Senegalese Tourist
- Holland MacFallister as Scandinavian Tourist
- Mel Kohl as Hot Dog Vendor
- Carl Solomon as Danny The Crooner
- Sal Koussa as Ricky Prickles
- Dana Haas as Big Heinie
- Jesse Keen as Big Thaddeus
- John Yuan as Hot Dog Mourner
- Matthew Yuan as Hot Dog Mourner

== Release ==
The Greasy Strangler premiered at the Sundance Film Festival on January 22, 2016. The film was released on October 7, 2016, by FilmRise.

=== Critical reception ===
The film received mixed reviews from critics. As of June 2026, it has a 62% approval rating on review aggregator website Rotten Tomatoes, based on 55 reviews, with an average score of 6/10. The site's consensus states: "The Greasy Strangler definitely isn't for everyone, but filmgoers in step with its off-kilter stride are in store for a singular cinematic experience." On Metacritic, the film has a 58 out of 100 rating, based on 13 critics, indicating "mixed or average reviews".

Jordan Hoffman, film critic of the British newspaper The Guardian, wrote that "the relentless monstrosity of a film is rife with fetishized cellulite, disgusting food and firehose penises. It's not for everyone – but perhaps it should be", in a four-star review that highlighted and praised the film’s bizarreness. Peter Bradshaw, also of The Guardian, described the film as providing "uncompromising yuckiness" as well as laughs, in a three-star review.

In contrast, Wendy Ide of The Guardian's sister paper The Observer gave it zero stars, stating "there’s nothing to this relentlessly inane horror comedy once you get past all the genitals" and describing it as "Like an early John Waters movie but without the sophistication". More than seven years after the original review, in a column of critics reappraising their zero-star reviews, Ide doubled down on her scathing criticism: "I probably could have tolerated […] all the artless, attention-seeking gross-out antics and the barely veiled contempt for the characters and the audience – if the film wasn’t also so thuddingly tedious."

James Franco wrote an article about The Greasy Strangler for his 'James Franco's Movie Column' in IndieWire: "Fake Penises Aren't the Only Funny Thing About The Greasy Strangler."

The Greasy Strangler won The Discovery Award at the 2017 British Independent Film Awards, and also won Best Comedy at the 2017 Empire Magazine Film Awards.
