= Andrew Hung =

- Born: Andrew Hung; Kidderminster
- Genres: Drone; electronica; indie rock; synthpop; avant-pop; electronic; garage rock; indietronica; lo-fi
- Occupations: Musician; songwriter; producer
- Instruments: Bass guitar; keyboards; synthesizers; guitar; drums; vocals
- Years active: 2003–present
- Labels: Lex; Death Waltz; ATPR
- Formerly of: Fuck Buttons

Andrew Hung is a British musician, songwriter and producer based in London, UK. He is one of the founding members of electronic drone band Fuck Buttons. He is currently signed to London based record label Lex Records.

== Life and career ==
Hung was born in Kidderminster. In 2012 Hung founded a new band called Dawn Hunger with vocalist Claire Inglis and musician Matthew de Pulford. He also released his solo debut EP called Rave Cave in 2015. Hung also works as a producer. In 2016 he co-wrote and co-produced Beth Orton's album Kidsticks. Hung also composed the soundtracks for the films The Greasy Strangler and An Evening with Beverly Luff Linn. Hung released his first solo debut LP, Realisationship, on 6 October 2017.

== Discography ==
=== Studio albums ===
- Realisationship (6 October 2017, Lex)
- Devastations (18 June 2021, Lex)
- Deliverance (11 August 2023, Lex)

=== Extended plays ===
- Rave Cave 1 (12 November 2015, self-released)
- Rave Cave 2 (15 December 2015, self-released)

=== Soundtracks ===
- The Greasy Strangler (5 October 2016, Death Waltz)
- An Evening with Beverly Luff Linn (19 October 2018, Lex)
