= Lady Terminator =

- VHS cover
- Directed by: Tjut Djalil (as Jalil Jackson)
- Written by: Karr Kruinowz
- Produced by: Ram Soraya
- Starring: Barbara Anne Constable; Christopher J. Hart; Claudia A. Rademaker; Fortunella; Ikang Fawzi; Adam Stardust
- Cinematography: Chu Chu Suteja
- Music by: Ricky Brothers
- Production companies: 108 Sound Studio; Soraya Intercine Film PT
- Distributed by: Studio Entertainment Distribution
- Release date: 1988
- Running time: 84 minutes (original cut); 80 or 82 minutes (edited cut)
- Country: Indonesia
- Language: English

Lady Terminator (Indonesian: Pembalasan Ratu Pantai Selatan, lit. 'Revenge of the South Sea Queen') is a 1988 English-language Indonesian horror-fantasy action film directed by Tjut Djalil, also credited under the pseudonym of Jalil Jackson. The film stars Barbara Anne Constable, Christopher J. Hart, and Claudia Angelique Rademaker, and is considered to be a mockbuster of the 1984 American film The Terminator.

== Plot ==
The Queen of the South Sea, an ancient sex goddess, seduces men before using a serpent that resides in her vagina to devour their penises. One man manages to grab the serpent, which turns into a dagger. Enraged, the Queen curses the man's would-be great granddaughter. In 1989, an anthropologist named Tania is investigating the legend of the Queen of the South Sea, which results in her diving to the Queen's resting place, being bound to a bed, her hands and legs spread wide apart and a serpent penetrating in her vagina, which allows the Queen to take control of her.

Tania goes on a rampage, massacring civilians in a nightclub and pursuing the descendant of the man, an aspiring pop star named Erica. A New York detective named Max McNeil investigates the murders and meets Erica. Tania attacks the police headquarters, shooting and killing numerous officers. After escaping the grip of Tania, McNeil and Erica have sex in a forest. Tania tracks them down and is eventually burned in a car explosion. She continues to pursue Erica, who eventually stabs her with the dagger her great-grandfather passed down to her, destroying Tania for good.

== Cast ==
- Barbara Anne Constable as Tania Wilson/Lady Terminator
- Christopher J. Hart as Max McNeil
- Claudia Angelique Rademaker as Erica
- Ikang Fawzi as Tom

== Release ==
The film was released in Indonesia in 1988 and in the United States on June 10, 1989. In recent years, the film was screened at the Toronto Underground Film Festival in 2010, the Belfast Film Festival in Ireland in 2014, and at the Offscreen Film Festival in Belgium in 2017.

== Critical reception ==
From contemporary reviews, "Lor." of Variety declared that the film "provides mainly camp and novelty value in its mixture of grotesque situations and laughable dialogue" while noting that "action scenes are okay, but visual effects are subpar." Cliff Doerksen of The Chicago Reader called the film "the kind of movie best randomly discovered on cable at 4 AM, but if you dig guys with mullets, director H. Tjut Djalil has some serious treats in store for you".

Kyle Anderson of Nerdist wrote that the "movie isn’t good, but it’s totally worth watching because of how baffling it is".

== Home media ==
The film was originally released on VHS in 1989. The film was released on DVD in 2004 by Mondo Macabro.
