= Joko (Javanese name) =

- Gender: Male

Origin
- Origin: Javanese
- Meaning: Young unmarried man; boy

Other names
- Alternative spelling: Jaka (standard spelling), Djoko (Dutch spelling)

Joko, Jaka, or Djoko (Javanese: ꦗꦏ) is a Javanese male name which means "young unmarried man" or "boy". Notable people with this name include:

== Given name ==
=== Djoko ===
- Djoko Iskandar (born 1950), Indonesian herpetologist
- Djoko Santoso (1952–2020), Indonesian retired general, former Chief of Staff of the Indonesian Army and former Commander of the Indonesian National Armed Forces
- Djoko Susanto (born 1950), Indonesian entrepreneur and businessman
- Djoko Suyanto (born 1950), Indonesian air chief marshal, Commander of the Indonesian National Armed Forces from 2006 to 2007
- Djoko Tjandra (born 1951), Chinese-Indonesian businessman and felon

=== Jaka ===
- Jaka Singgih (born 1958), Indonesian businessman and politician

=== Joko ===
- Joko Anwar (born 1976), Indonesian filmmaker, producer, screenwriter and actor
- Joko Arter (1955–2007), Indonesian boxer
- Joko Mardianto (born 1965), Indonesian former badminton player
- Joko Pinurbo (1962–2024), Indonesian poet
- Joko Ribowo (born 1989), Indonesian footballer
- Joko Riyadi (born 1985), Indonesian former badminton player
- Joko Sasongko (born 1990), Indonesian footballer
- Joko Sidik (born 1988), Indonesian footballer
- Joko Suprianto (born 1966), Indonesian former badminton player
- Joko Susilo (born 1996), Indonesian football defender
- Joko Sutopo, Indonesian politician
- Joko Tingkir (died 1582), founder and the first king of the Sultanate of Pajang
- Joko Widodo (born 1961), Indonesian politician and businessman, President of Indonesia

== Middle name ==
- Ki Joko Bodo (1964–2022), Indonesian actor
- Dwi Joko Prihatin (born 1982), Indonesian former football right back
