= Eva Arnaz =

Indonesian film actress

- Born: Eva Yanthi Arnaz; 14 July 1956 (age 70); Bukittinggi, West Sumatra, Indonesia
- Other name: Siti Syarifah
- Years active: 1976–1996
- Children: 1

Siti Syarifah (born Eva Yanthi Arnaz; 14 July 1956), better known as Eva Arnaz, is an Indonesian actress who was prominent in Indonesian films in the 1980s. She was best known for her work in action films. She later became a devout Muslim, left the entertainment industry and changed her name to Siti Syarifah.

== Filmography ==
- Primitif (1978)
- Musim bercinta (1978)
- Special Silencers (1979) as Julia
- Lembah duka (1981)
- Jaka Sembung (The Warrior; 1981)
- Warok singo kobra (1982)
- Serbuan halilintar (1982)
- Pasukan berani mati (1982)
- Perempuan Bergairah (1982) as Bambi
- Ferocious Female Freedom Fighters, Part 2 (1982) as Bambi
- Pokoknya beres (1983)
- Midah perawan buronan (1983)
- Maju kena mundur kena (1983)
- Five Deadly Angels (1983)
- Membakar Matahari (1984)
- Gadis bionic (1984)
- Putri duyung (1985)
- Noda X (1985)
- Hell Raiders (1985)
- Bajing Ireng dan Jaka Sembung (Jaka Sembung & Bergola Ijo, or The Warrior and the Ninja; 1985)
- Depan bisa belakang bisa (1987)
- Cintaku di rumah susun (1987)
- Barang terlarang (1987) as Rini
- Suamiku sayang (1990) as Tience
- Lupa aturan main (1990)
- Antri dong (1990)
- Perawan metropolitan (1991) as Nurlela
- Barang titipan (1991)
- Asmara (1992)
