= Tjut Djalil =

Indonesian film director and screenwriter (1927–2014)

- Born: 11 October 1927; Koetaradja, Dutch East Indies
- Died: 28 May 2014 (aged 86); Jakarta, Indonesia
- Occupations: Film director, screenwriter
- Years active: 1974–1994

H. Tjut Djalil (11 October 1927 – 28 May 2014) was an Indonesian film director and screenwriter. His feature directorial debut was the 1974 film Benyamin Spion 025. He was also known for directing such cult films as Mystics in Bali (1981), Bajing Ireng dan Jaka Sembung (1985), Lady Terminator (1989) and Dangerous Seductress (1995).

Prior to entering the film industry, Djalil was a newspaper reporter and author of short stories.
