= Si Buta Lawan Jaka Sembung =

- Indonesian Film Poster
- Directed by: Dasri Yacob
- Produced by: Sabirin Kasdani
- Starring: Barry Prima, Advent Bangun
- Distributed by: Rapi Films
- Release date: 1983
- Country: Indonesia
- Languages: Indonesian, Dutch, Mandarin (in tv series)

Si Buta Lawan Jaka Sembung (also titled The Warrior II and The Warrior Against Blind Swordsman for international distribution) is a 1983 Indonesian fantastique martial arts movie and a sequel to 1981 film Jaka Sembung.

Supporting character Si Buta is originally from a cartoon on his own right (Si Buta Dari Gua Hantu) and Bajing Ireng, a female freedom fighter versed in stealth, makes her first appearance in Jaka Sembung films. Main roles are played by action film star Barry Prima (Jaka Sembung), karateka Advent Bangun (Soca Indra Sukma alias Si Buta dari Gunung Iblis ("The Blind Man from Iblis Mountain")), Sri Gudhi Sintara (Dewi Magi), and Zurmaini (Roijah alias Bajing Ireng).

== Synopsis ==
Dutch colonial army in West Java holds a martial arts tournament to select the best warrior to confront local warrior-freedom fighter Parmin (nicknamed Jaka Sembung). The winner is an obscure blind swordsman and the Dutch commander De Mandes (Gino Makasutji) commissions him. However, the swordsman is sympathetic with Jaka Sembung's cause and things get more complicated when magician seductress Dewi Magi as well as her guru (W. D. Mochtar) intervene on behalf of the Dutch.
