= Barry Prima =

Indonesian actor, stuntman, fight choreographer, and martial artist

- Born: Humbertus Knoch; 19 August 1954 (age 71); Bandung, West Java, Indonesia
- Other names: Barry Prima
- Occupations: Actor; stuntman; fight choreographer; martial artist
- Years active: 1978–present
- Spouse: Eva Arnaz (m. 1983; div. 1988)

Humbertus Knoch, better known as Barry Prima (born 19 August 1954), is an Indonesian actor and martial artist of mixed Dutch and Sundanese who was one of the biggest stars of Indonesian cinema during the 1980s.

== Filmography ==
The following is a partial filmography (Prima has appeared in over 60 movies).

- Realita, Cinta dan Rock'n Roll a.k.a. Reality, Love, and Rock'N Roll (2006)
- Janji Joni a.k.a. Joni's Promise (2005)
- Menumpas Teroris a.k.a. Fighting Terrorists (1986)
- The Warrior and the Ninja (1985)
- No Time to Die (1984)
- The Devil's Sword (1984)
- The Warrior Against Blind Swordsman (Si Buta Lawan Jaka Sembung) (1983)
- Perempuan Bergairah (1982)
- Srigala (1981)
- The Warrior (Jaka Sembung) (1981)
- Primitif (1978)

== Awards and nominations ==
| Year | Awards | Category | Recipients | Results |
|---|---|---|---|---|
| 2006 | MTV Indonesia Movie Awards | Most Favorite Supporting Actor | Realita, Cinta dan Rock'n Roll | Nominated |
| 2013 | Maya Award | Best Actor in an Omnibus | Pintu Harmonika | Nominated |
