= Sofia W. D. =

Indonesian actress and film director

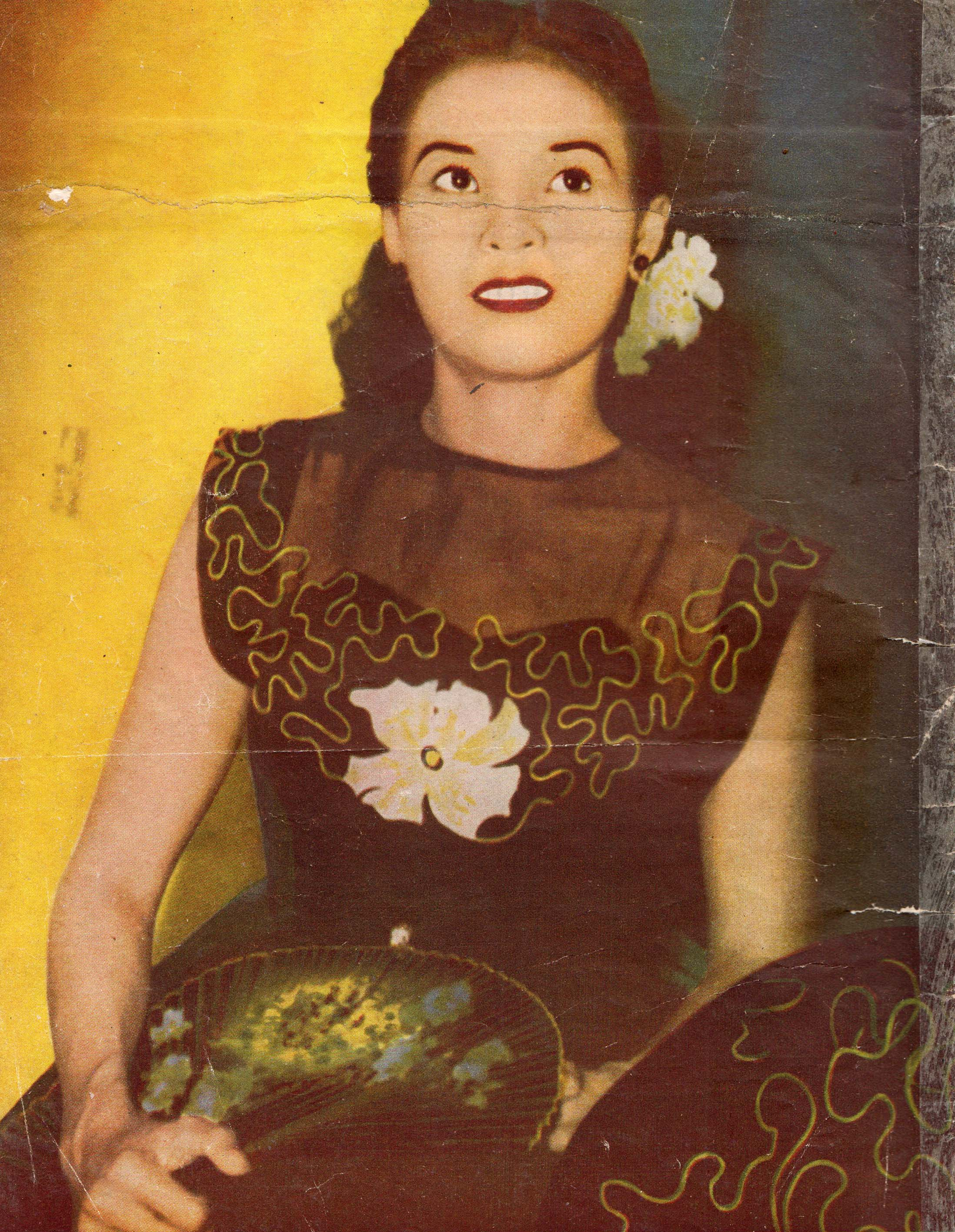
- Sofia, c. 1954
- Born: 12 October 1924; Bandoeng, Dutch East Indies
- Died: 23 July 1986 (aged 61); Jakarta, Indonesia
- Other name: Sofia Waldi
- Occupations: Actress, film director
- Years active: 1952–1986

Sofia W. D. (12 October 1924 – 23 July 1986) was an Indonesian actress and film director. She appeared in 43 films between 1952 and 1986. Her film Badai-Selatan was entered into the 12th Berlin International Film Festival. She was the part of Classical Indonesian cinema.

== Selected filmography ==
- Badai-Selatan (1962)
- Max Havelaar (1975)
- Mystics in Bali (1981)
- Pengkhianatan G30S/PKI (1984)
