= Jaka Sembung =

- Directed by: Sisworo Gautama
- Written by: Imam Tantowi
- Produced by: Sisworo Gautama
- Starring: Barry Prima
- Distributed by: Rapi Films
- Release date: 1981
- Country: Indonesia
- Languages: Indonesian, Dutch

Jaka Sembung (also titled The Warrior for international distribution) is a 1981 Indonesian fantasy martial arts film, based on a character of the same name on a comic book by Djair.

Directed by Sisworo Gautama, one of the best-known Indonesian action directors, Jaka Sembung has established its position as a classic Indonesian action movie. Main roles are played by Barry Prima (the title role), Dicky Zulkarnaen (Commander Van Schram), Eva Arnaz (Surti), and Indo actress Dana Christina (Maria van Schram).

Jaka Sembung spawned several sequels: Si Buta Lawan Jaka Sembung (The Warrior Against Blind Swordsman) (1983), Bajing Ireng dan Jaka Sembung (Jaka Sembung Dan Bergola Ijo or The Warrior vs. the Ninja) (1985), and Jaka Sembung Dan Dewi Samudra (1990).

== Synopsis ==
The story is about local warrior-freedom fighter Parmin (nicknamed Jaka Sembung) who fights against Dutch colonial army in West Java in the 19th century. During his struggle, he has to face hired warriors and pagan magician Kobar (S. Parya) who are Dutch operatives with supernatural powers.

The final showdown is between Jaka Sembung and Ki Hitam (W.D. Mochtar), a warrior with magical power – his organs (hands, feet, head, etc.) may be cut off his body, but as long as it touches the ground, the organs will return. Only by his wit and skills Jaka Sembung can finally defeat this deadly enemy.
