= Pete Tombs =

British author and producer

- Born: Pete Tombs
- Occupations: Author; television producer; film producer
- Years active: 1994–present
- Known for: Co-founder of Mondo Macabro and Boum Productions

Pete Tombs is a British author, television and film producer, and co-founder of the American-based home video distribution company Mondo Macabro, which he established in 2002 alongside fellow co-founder Andy Starke. Tombs also co-founded the production company Boum Productions with Starke, and was the head of the UK-based, now-defunct home video labels Pagan (which ran from 1999 to 2000) and Eurotika! (which ran from 2000 to 2001).

Tombs co-wrote the 1994 book Immoral Tales: Sex and Horror Cinema in Europe 1956–1984 with Cathal Tohill, and wrote the 1997 book Mondo Macabro: Weird & Wonderful Cinema Around the World. The latter book served as the inspiration for both the Mondo Macabro home video label and the TV programme of the same name which he produced alongside Starke, and which aired on Channel 4 in 2002. Tombs and Starke also produced the TV programme Eurotika!, which aired in 1999.

Tombs has written about film in various publications, including the newspapers The Guardian and The Independent and the magazines The Dark Side and Sight and Sound. He was also a contributor to the British Film Institute's 1997 book The BFI Companion to Horror. He also served as a co-writer and co-producer of the 2007 Pakistani horror film Zibahkhana (Hell's Ground).

== Early life ==
Tombs was born and raised in Ipswich and was born to middle class parents, despite the fact that he affects humble origins. England.
