= Mondo Macabro =

Home video label

- Industry: Home video
- Founded: 2002; 24 years ago
- Founders: Pete Tombs; Andy Starke
- Headquarters: U.S.
- Key people: Pete Tombs (Director)
- Products: DVDs and Blu-ray Discs
- Website: mondo-macabro.com

Mondo Macabro is an American-based home video distribution company founded in 2002 by Pete Tombs and Andy Starke. Their focus is releasing cult and exploitation films on DVD and Blu-ray and was named after Tombs' 1997 book Mondo Macabro: Weird & Wonderful Cinema Around the World.

Mondo Macabro was initially based in the United Kingdom, before Starke suggested basing it in the United States. Mondo Macabro's catalog of releases includes cult and exploitation films produced in such countries as Argentina, Indonesia, and Pakistan. The first title released on the Mondo Macabro label was the 1977 Mexican horror film Alucarda, which the company issued on DVD in 2003. Other films released by Mondo Macabro include The Diabolical Dr. Z (1966), The Mansion of Madness (1973), Challenge of the Tiger (1980), Mystics in Bali (1981), and Aswang (1994).
