= List of Warkop films =

Indonesian films

Warkop is a comedy group comprising Wahjoe Sardono (Dono), Kasino Hadiwibowo (Kasino), Indrodjojo Kusumonegoro (Indro), Nanu Moeljono (Nanu), and Rudy Badil. Dono, Kasino, Nanu, and Rudy were students at the University of Indonesia, while Indro attended Pancasila University. They initially gained popularity with the radio show Obrolan Santai di Warung Kopi, broadcast by Radio Prambors. In this show, Dono portrayed Slamet from Central Java, Kasino played various characters including Mas Bei (Javanese), Acing/Acong (Chinese), Sanwani (Betawi), and Buyung (Minang), and Indro took on roles like Mastowi (Tegal), Paijo (Purbalingga), and Ubai or Ansori. Nanu played Poltak from North Sumatra, and Rudi Badil portrayed Mr. James (Chinese) and Bang Cholil.

The group transitioned to the silver screen with their debut in the 1980 film Mana Tahaaan... under the banner Warkop Prambors. However, Rudy Badil withdrew due to stage fright, leaving four members to participate. The film was successful, but shortly after, Nanu left the group and died on 22 March 1983 due to kidney cancer.

In 1980, Parkit Film, led by Raam Punjabi, became the primary producer for Warkop films, a partnership that lasted until 1985. Subsequently, Warkop collaborated with Soraya Intercine Films under Ram Soraya's leadership. Their first film with Soraya, Atas Boleh Bawah Boleh (1986), marked the transition from Warkop Prambors to Warkop DKI (Dono-Kasino-Indro) to avoid paying royalty to Prambors. Other production companies, such as Garuda Film under Hendrick Gozali, also contributed to producing Warkop films.

From 1980 to 1995, Warkop starred in a total of 34 comedy films and one docudrama. Their films were typically released during major holidays such as Christmas, New Year, or Eid Al-Fitr. According to Indro, Warkop films consistently performed well at the Indonesian box office, despite occasional disappointments like IQ Jongkok and Setan Kredit.

== Comedy films ==
=== List of films ===
No.	Year(s)	Title	Director	Writer(s)	Producer(s)	Production house	Ref.
1	1980	Mana Tahaaan...	Nawi Ismail	Warkop and Nawi Ismail	Jiwat Ibrahim	Bola Dunia Film	
2	1980	Gengsi Dong	Nawi Ismail	Warkop and Nawi Ismail	Jiwat Ibrahim	Bola Dunia Film	
3	1981	Pintar Pintar Bodoh	Arizal	Deddy Armand	Raam Punjabi, Dhamoo Punjabi and Gobind Punjabi	Parkit Film	
4	1981	Gede Rasa	Nawi Ismail	Elanda Rosi	Tulus Pangabean	Bola Dunia Film	
5	1981	Manusia 6.000.000 Dollar	Ali Shahab	Ali Shahab	Jiwat Ibrahim	Bola Dunia Film	
6	1982	IQ Jongkok	Iksan Lahardi	Warkop and Deddy Armand	Haryadi Siswanto	Nugraha Mas Film	
7	1982	Setan Kredit	Iksan Lahardi	Deddy Armand	Haryadi Siswanto	Nugraha Mas Film	
8	1982	Dongkrak Antik	Arizal	Deddy Armand	Raam Punjabi and Dhamoo Punjabi	Parkit Film	
9	1983	Maju Kena Mundur Kena	Arizal	Raam Punjabi and Deddy Armand	Raam and Dhamoo Punjabi	Parkit Film	
10	1983	CHIPS	Iksan Lahardi	Warkop dan Deddy Armand	Haryadi Siswanto	Nugraha Mas Film	
11	1984	Pokoknya Beres	Arizal	Raam Punjabi and Deddy Armand	Raam Punjabi and Dhamoo Punjabi	Parkit Film	
12	1984	Tahu Diri Dong	Arizal	Raam Punjabi and Deddy Armand	Raam Punjabi and Dhamoo Punjabi	Parkit Film	
13	1984	Itu Bisa Diatur	Arizal	Raam Punjabi and Deddy Armand	Raam Punjabi and Dhamoo Punjabi	Parkit Film	
14	1985	Gantian Dong	Arizal	Raam Punjabi and Deddy Armand	Raam Punjabi and Dhamoo Punjabi	Parkit Film	
15	1985	Kesempatan dalam Kesempitan	Arizal	Raam Punjabi and Deddy Armand	Raam Punjabi and Dhamoo Punjabi	Parkit Film	
16	1986	Sama Juga Bohong	Chaerul Umam	Norbertus Riantiarno	Hendrick Gozali	Garuda Film	
17	1986	Atas Boleh Bawah Boleh	Tjut Djalil	Naryono Prayitno	Ram Soraya	Soraya Intercine Films	
18	1987	Makin Lama Makin Asyik	A. Rachman	A. Rachman	Ram Soraya	Soraya Intercine Films	
19	1987	Depan Bisa Belakang Bisa	Tjut Djalil	Djoko S. Koesdiman	Ram Soraya	Soraya Intercine Films	
20	1988	Saya Suka Kamu Punya	Tommy Burnama	Dono and Baron Achmadi	Ram Soraya	Soraya Intercine Films	
21	1988	Jodoh Boleh Diatur	Ami Prijono	Djamsan Djakiman	Hendrick Gozali	Garuda Film	
22	1989	Malu Malu Mau	Sisworo Gautama Putra	Deddy Armand	Ram Soraya	Soraya Intercine Films	
23	1989	Godain Kita Dong	Hadi Poernomo	Agusti Tanjung	Ram Soraya	Soraya Intercine Films	
24	1990	Sabar Dulu Dong...!	Ida Farida	Ida Farida	Ram Soraya	Soraya Intercine Films	
25	1990	Mana Bisa Tahan	Arizal	Agusti Tanjung	Ram Soraya	Soraya Intercine Films	
26	1991	Lupa Aturan Main	Arizal	Agusti Tanjung	Ram Soraya	Soraya Intercine Films	
27	1991	Sudah Pasti Tahan	Arizal	Agusti Tanjung	Ram Soraya	Soraya Intercine Films	
28	1992	Bisa Naik Bisa Turun	Arizal	Agusti Tanjung	Ram Soraya	Soraya Intercine Films	
29	1992	Masuk Kena Keluar Kena	Arizal	Agusti Tanjung	Ram Soraya	Soraya Intercine Films	
30	1993	Salah Masuk	Tjut Djalil	Agusti Tanjung	Ram Soraya	Soraya Intercine Films	
31	1993	Bagi-Bagi Dong	Tjut Djalil	Agusti Tanjung	Ram Soraya	Soraya Intercine Films	
32	1994	Bebas Aturan Main	Tjut Djalil	Agusti Tanjung	Ram Soraya	Soraya Intercine Films	
33	1994	Saya Duluan Dong	Arizal	Agusti Tanjung	Ram Soraya	Soraya Intercine Films	
34	1995	Pencet Sana Pencet Sini	Arizal	Agusti Tanjung	Ram Soraya	Soraya Intercine Films	

=== Mana Tahaaan... ===
The story begins with Slamet, Paijo, Sanwani, and Poltak meeting as students in Jakarta. They rent rooms in Aunt Mira's house and develop an affection for Halimah, the maid there. Later, it's revealed that Halimah is pregnant, which angers Aunt Mira since none of her boarders admit responsibility. After a thorough investigation, it's uncovered that Aunt Mira's boyfriend, Sugeng, is the father. Aunt Mira expels Sugeng and Halimah from her house. Despite initially evicting all the boarders, Aunt Mira rejoices upon discovering they have all graduated from university.

This film marks Nanu Moeljono's sole appearance with Warkop. He left the group shortly after its release, and the character of Poltak was subsequently portrayed by Dorman Borisman in the film Gede Rasa.

=== Gengsi Dong ===
Slamet, the son of a wealthy tobacco merchant, Paijo, the son of an oil tycoon, and Sanwani, the son of a small workshop owner, are all studying at the same university. They each fall in love with Rita, the daughter of a lecturer, and compete eagerly for her affections. However, their hopes are dashed when they discover that Rita's father has already arranged for her to marry a pilot.

=== Pintar Pintar Bodoh ===
Dono, Kasino, Indro, and Dorman Borisman decide to venture into the detective agency business. However, misunderstandings arise among them, causing their friendship to split into two factions: Team Kasino-Dono and Team Indro-Dorman. Both teams compete fiercely to prove themselves as top detectives. The rivalry intensifies as they vie to hire a beautiful secretary and showcase their detective skills. Little do they know, their secretaries betray them by dating each other and leaking confidential information back and forth.

Eventually, both teams face bankruptcy due to insufficient income and fail to solve any cases. This film marks Warkop's debut production under Parkit Film. Interestingly, the characters' names like Slamet (Dono), Sanwani (Kasino), Paijo (Indro), and Poltak (Dorman Borisman) are replaced by the actors' real names for the first time in Warkop's history.

=== Gede Rasa ===
In this storyline, Slamet and Poltak, still without steady jobs after college, decide to work for the wealthy Sanwani's family. Sanwani's younger sister, Tiwi, develops an interest in Paijo, who is a doctor. Tiwi becomes the focus of attention for both Slamet and Poltak. Eventually, it is revealed that Sanwani plans to marry his girlfriend, Sarah. However, Tiwi's hopes with Paijo are dashed when she learns that Paijo's parents have already arranged his marriage.

In this film, the character of Poltak is portrayed by Dorman Borisman. Previously, in the film Mana Tahaaan..., the role of Poltak was played by Nanu Moeljono.

=== Manusia 6.000.000 Dollar ===
Dono, Kasino, Indro, and Dorman Borisman are now part of a special unit within the police force. During a mission, Dono suffers a serious accident that results in him being transformed into a robot, an operation costing US$6,000,000. As members of this special team, their primary responsibility is to investigate societal crimes, including cases involving pornography and child abduction. The narrative unfolds with the team delving into a case involving a professional kidnapping syndicate targeting children and a singer named Rita Aduhai Merdubanget.

This film is inspired and parodies from 1970s television series The Six Million Dollar Man. A year later, a sequel was made to this film entitled Gadis Bionik (also parodied from 1970s television series The Bionic Woman). But unlike the first film, Warkop DKI are not involved in this film.

=== IQ Jongkok ===
Dono, Kasino, and Indro come to the aid of Mr. Broto after he is involved in a hit-and-run accident. Mr. Broto leaves behind a treasure map, sparking the trio's adventure into forests, over hills, and across rivers in search of the treasure. Along the journey, Dono meets Maya, who eventually reveals that her father was responsible for hitting Mr. Broto. Maya's father agrees to join forces with Dono, Kasino, and Indro in the quest for the treasure, even orchestrating his own imprisonment to aid their efforts. Despite their efforts, the treasure remains elusive, leading to Dono and Maya's relationship falling apart. The three friends humorously commemorate their failure by cutting into a cake that unexpectedly explodes when the candles are lit.

The film also features a parody of the wedding between Charles, Prince of Wales, and Diana Spencer, with Dono and Maya staging their own version at GPIB Immanuel Jakarta.

=== Setan Kredit ===
Dono, Kasino, and Indro hear a radio announcement about a missing child, with a reward offered for their safe return. Intrigued by the prize, they visit a sacred place to search for clues. The guardian of the place imposes a condition: they must bring individuals who are willing to extend credit or trust.

After rounding up such people and fulfilling their promise to the guardian, they seek clues but receive none. It is revealed that the news of the missing child was erroneous—the child had simply been hiding and was mistakenly reported as missing.

=== Dongkrak Antik ===
In this film, the Warkop Trio, alongside Mat Solar, are employed at a hotel managed by Paulus. Each of them faces unique challenges: Dono, who is forgetful and competes with Paulus for the affections of Sri Anunia (played by Meriam Bellina), a beautiful employee; Kasino, known for his foul language; Indro, who stutters and uses a unique method of slapping his own buttocks to speak fluently; and Mat Solar, who is deaf.

The comedy unfolds as Dono inadvertently leads groups of foreigners, mistakenly takes aphrodisiacs, causing chaos while learning to dance; Kasino impersonates a shaman in a cemetery to trick Paulus; Indro tackles his stutter by first slapping his own buttocks; and Mat Solar's deafness leads to misunderstandings with his uncle.

The character Paulus in this film is based on Paulus Wirutomo, a friend of Dono's and a lecturer at the University of Indonesia.

=== CHIPS ===
In this film, the Warkop Trio works as private public service officers, particularly in security and order at an institution named CHIPS (Cara Hebat Ikut Penanggulangan Masalah Sosial), led by Junet. A memorable line from the film is "jangkrik boss!", which Kasino uses as an excuse when catching Junet in a romantic moment with a woman in the middle of the forest. The film concludes on a somewhat tragic note, as Dono is forced to abandon his plan to propose to Sherly because she must comply with an arranged marriage to someone else, who turns out to be Junet, their former boss.

This film is inspired by and parodies the famous 1980s television series "CHiPs" (California Highway Patrol), starring Erik Estrada as Ponchorello.

=== Maju Kena Mundur Kena ===
Dono and Indro are roommates and employees under Kasino at the workshop. Kasino warns Dono and Indro not to get involved with women. However, secretly, Kasino longs for a girl whose photo he found in a magazine. By chance, when Dono is on night duty, he has to repair a car belonging to a woman named Marina. This angers Kasino because Marina hasn't paid her bill yet. Unexpectedly, Marina moves to live in the same boarding house as Dono and his friends. Kasino is shocked to discover that Marina is the girl he has been longing for.

Kasino tries to get closer to Marina, but it is Dono who benefits unexpectedly. When Marina meets her grandparents, who arranged a marriage for her, she claims she is already married to Dono.

=== Pokoknya Beres ===
Dono, Kasino, Indro, Marina, and Anita are friends who share a boarding house owned by Pak Us Us. The story begins with Dono, who is skilled at cooking but gets rejected after applying to various restaurants. Meanwhile, Indro and Kasino spend their time chasing girls with all their charm but continuously fail. One day, Anita disappears without her friends' knowledge because her father visits. Kasino goes to search for her but ends up getting arrested by a policewoman he flirted with. Indro also gets caught by the police for breaking a public phone booth's glass while trying to force it open after getting stuck due to a jammed door.

At the end of the film, the name Robert Davis Chaniago is mentioned, possibly based on two sources. Firstly, it could be derived from Robert P. Davis, an American screenwriter. Secondly, it might be linked to Davis Robert, a prominent lawyer in Chicago. Director Arizal, who hails from West Sumatra, added the surname Chaniago to create the full name Robert Davis Chaniago.

=== Tahu Diri Dong ===
Kasino, attempting to impress, hangs an abstract painting on the wall of Pak Us Us' house, which doubles as their boarding house, causing the plaster to crack. Fearing Pak Us Us' wrath, Kasino, Dono, Indro, Marina, and Anita try to cover up the damage with deception, but their efforts are quickly uncovered. They face Pak Us Us' anger and are ordered to repair the damage immediately. Meanwhile, Dono tries to deceive his recently arrived grandfather from the village into believing he's become a doctor, but the truth is soon revealed. The story continues with Anita testing her boyfriend's love at a party, where she asks Dono to pretend to be her boyfriend. However, Dono's clumsy behavior ruins the party, leaving Anita frustrated. In another sequence, Indro competes in a cooking competition with a recipe he has prepared. Since the competition is only open to women, Dono dresses up as a woman to participate and ends up winning. However, his disguise is exposed, leading to the cancellation of his prize. Dono protests, insisting on taking home the food from the competition, but the organizers refuse, sparking a chaotic cake-throwing battle.

=== Itu Bisa Diatur ===
Dono, Kasino, and Indro, the inseparable trio, are entrusted with opening a restaurant due to Dono's culinary skills. The humor in the restaurant revolves around various antics: food items ordered running out, leading to musical chairs resulting in guests falling down, and a stern food critic who surprisingly praises their dishes. Another joke involves Indro and Susan, the restaurant cashier, playfully messing around with the security guard's handcuffs and accidentally locking themselves, forcing them to go everywhere together and causing Indro's girlfriend to be annoyed. Further comedy ensues at a fitness center where Henny, a flight attendant acquaintance of Dono's, teaches. And, of course, there's the banter and playful rivalry among the trio themselves.

=== Gantian Dong ===
Kasino, attempting to woo Vera, a girl aspiring to act in movies, claims to have a famous director friend named Indro who has just returned from abroad. During the holiday, Indro, Dono, Ira, and Lia go camping. Kasino deliberately invites Vera to join the camping trip. Vera, suspecting correctly that Indro is a director, tries to get close to him. This leads to misunderstandings and tensions, until Kasino's lies are finally exposed. Meanwhile, Indro is troubled by the presence of Lola, an older virgin woman trying to win his heart. However, it turns out Dono also likes Lola, leading to a chase between them. Again, Kasino gets involved with another girl, this time at a restaurant. The girl he pursues happens to be Julia, who already has a boyfriend. Once again, Indro becomes the target of jealousy from Julia's boyfriend, Tony, a tough guy. Indro is chased wherever he goes, causing him to feel scared everywhere. Dono and Kasino suggest that Indro hide in a coffin and announce that Indro has died. Initially, Tony believes it, but eventually realizes Indro is only pretending. Fortunately, Julia arrives to clear up the misunderstanding, saving Indro from further trouble.

=== Kesempatan dalam Kesempitan ===
Dono works at a cigarette agency while Kasino works at a workshop. They suggest that Indro should be accepted as a tenant at Tina and Santi's boarding house. Comedy ensues as Indro deals with the arrival of his girlfriend and her father, trying to ensure Tina and Santi, who live together, aren't suspicious. Santi's fanatical mother also pays a visit, adding to the chaos. Further hilarity unfolds when Kasino crashes Dono's girlfriend's car while driving it. Kasino pretends to have amnesia, but the car ends up being sold. This becomes problematic when the buyer demands a refund.

This film marks the last appearance under the name Warkop Prambors and also the final film by Warkop under the Parkit Film production company.

=== Sama Juga Bohong ===
Dono, Kasino, and Indro are college students who rent a room at Nia's parents' house. They successfully create a robot with plans to commercialize it. Along the way, they befriend Chintami, a top singer. Together with her, they organize a charity performance to repair Ayu's nearly collapsing house and to support orphaned children. As the performance approaches, Chintami is delayed because her manager opposes the event. With his trademark humor, Dono manages to bring Chintami to the venue. However, Chintami's manager follows and disrupts the show by creating a spectacle of his own on stage.

This film marks the first movie by Warkop under the name Warkop DKI group.

=== Atas Boleh Bawah Boleh ===
Dono, Kasino, and Indro went hunting. During the hunt, Dono fainted and was cared for by the local village head. Dono fell in love with the village head's daughter. After discovering her true nature, Dono ran away and had another accident. He was hospitalized and then fell in love with his nurse, Susy. Quietly, Indro also fell for Susy. Competition ensued, but neither succeeded in winning Susy's heart after she decided to move to the Netherlands.

This film is the first movie by Warkop under the production of Soraya Intercine Films.

=== Makin Lama Makin Asyik ===
Dono, Kasino, and Indro live in a boarding house. The comedy begins when their flat owner, Bu Sarah, is dating someone. Kasino and Indro install microphones, causing the sounds of their dates to be heard throughout the rooms. This sparks a conflict between Bu Sarah and the three friends. Later, Erna, Bu Sarah's niece, arrives. The trio competes to win Erna's heart. One day, Erna invites them to a nightclub where they unexpectedly encounter Bu Sarah again. To evade Bu Sarah, Dono, Kasino, and Indro are forced to disguise themselves as women.

=== Depan Bisa Belakang Bisa ===
Dono, Kasino, and Indro act as private detectives in an investigation agency named "Depan Bisa Belakang Bisa." Kasino plays the role of Dono and Indro's boss. One day, they receive an order to secure a jewelry exhibition hosted by a Japanese investor named Satomata. However, simultaneously, an insurance company offers them a job to oversee the jewels, suspecting Satomata of foul play. Dono works for Satomata, while Indro joins the insurance company's side. Indro eventually leaves the agency but returns after Kasino agrees to address payment transparency issues. Dono, along with a Japanese woman named Michiko, steals the jewels after discovering Satomata's fraudulent activities to deceive the insurance company. Satomata and the insurance personnel end up fighting over the jewels, which are accidentally crushed by Satomata. It turns out the real jewels were secured by Michiko, who is actually a girl from Bukit Tinggi named Siti Hadijah.

This film parodies four international franchises simultaneously: Sherlock Holmes, James Bond, The A-Team, and Uchuu Keiji Gavan.

=== Saya Suka Kamu Punya ===
Dono, Kasino, and Indro are accepted as performers in a traditional Javanese theater group called Tonil, where their comedic antics on stage, including staged fights that thrill the audience, become a hit. However, they face another problem: the land where the theater stands is coveted by Gozali, a cunning real estate businessman. The struggle over the land and its certificate becomes a source of humor. The resolution involves Dono and his friends engaging in boxing matches against Gozali's champions, culminating in a showdown with Doyok, who imitates Bruce Lee's style.

In this film, Dono (alongside Baron Achmadi) also appears as a screenplay writer.

=== Jodoh Boleh Diatur ===
Dono, Kasino, and Indro look for girlfriends through a matchmaking agency. Problems arise when their recommended partners from the agency cause complications. Indro is disappointed to find out his partner is researching male fidelity for her thesis. Dono almost gets fired for spending too much time on the phone dating. Meanwhile, Kasino's partner turns out to be a scammer. Dono's potential girlfriend, Rita, suddenly disappears and leaves a baby in his care through her grandfather. It turns out Rita is avoiding her husband who has come looking to reconcile. She left because she didn't want to be in a polygamous marriage. The comedy shifts focus to the baby, reminiscent of the film "Three Men and a Baby." Dono falls in love with the baby, and when Rita and her husband return to Malaysia, Dono acts as if he has lost his memory and follows them to Malaysia, carrying the doll, accompanied by Indro and Kasino. After reuniting with the baby, he regains his laughter.

This film is unique as it is the only Warkop movie shot outside Indonesia, specifically in Malaysia. The storyline leans more towards romantic drama despite its comedic elements.

=== Malu Malu Mau ===
Dono, Kasino, and Indro live in the same boarding house with Lisa and Selly. The owner of the boarding house is Pak Raden. Due to reading the results of a magazine quiz, Indro becomes curious when Kasino teases him that one of their housemates has a crush on him. Through various jokes and misunderstandings, it turns out to be a misunderstanding. Kasino himself faces misfortune when a bank employee mistakenly gives him more money than requested. Dealing with the excess money and attempting to return it leads to convoluted and humorous situations. Then, it's Dono's turn to get involved with a foreign girlfriend, which also ends in misfortune.

Sisworo Gautama Putra, known for his mystical-themed films, was chosen to direct this movie.

=== Godain Kita Dong ===
Kasino and Indro work at their uncle's chicken farm. They envy Dono, their cousin who studies in the United States. When Dono returns, he brings along his American girlfriend, Madonna, even though his parents had already arranged for him to marry Ayu Sukoco.

=== Sabar Dulu Dong ===
Dono, Kasino, Indro, and their two female friends, Winny and Anita, successfully transform an old heritage building, inherited by Winny's father, into a 3-star hotel. The management of the hotel becomes a source of comedy, including Dono's investigation of a hotel guest suspected of harboring women in his room, who turns out to be the guest's sister; Indro flirting with a French tourist referred to by Winny as "Bule Belel"; Dono's fondness for a pet rat named Omen, more precisely Omen Warkop; a mistaken identity of a dead person who is actually just sleeping due to exhaustion; and a sleepwalking guest known as Mevrouw Rudolf, as well as the intrusion of a Bounty Hunter who is actually hunting for a rat.

Through the film Sabar Dulu Doong...!, Ida Farida became the first and only female director to ever direct a Warkop film.

=== Mana Bisa Tahan ===
In this film, Dono has two girlfriends simultaneously, Windy and Cindy. Dono's life becomes complicated as he struggles to manage meetings with both of them, leading to frequent misunderstandings. This situation causes envy in Kasino and Indro. They decide to sabotage Dono's relationships with both girlfriends by intentionally speaking ill of Dono in front of Windy's and Cindy's parents, hoping to end Dono's relationships. Their actions stem from jealousy and a desire to disrupt Dono's life. However, Dono doesn't take this lying down and decides to take revenge. He plans a revenge scheme to prank Kasino and Indro. This retaliation might be intended to teach them a lesson or simply to get back at them. Overall, the storyline portrays the dynamics of friendship and a love triangle filled with chaos and intrigue. Mutual pranking and revenge play a significant role in the plot, adding comedic elements and funny situations among Dono, Kasino, and Indro.

=== Lupa Aturan Main ===
Dono, Kasino, Indro, Bella, and Debby are about to receive a visit from a beautiful singer named Donna at their house. However, chaos ensues when a snaggle-toothed robber roams around looking for targets. Determined to catch the robber, they devise a strategy based on a newspaper article praising Dono's bravery in challenging the robber. The robber appears, who is actually an undercover police officer assigned to guard Dono. Dono and his friends swiftly apprehend the robber by feeding him poisoned onde-onde (rice flour balls). After the officer is knocked out, another person in a disguised police uniform arrives, who turns out to be the real robber. In a tense situation, Sofia persuades the fake police officer with onde-onde, causing him to also pass out. In the end, the real fake robber, who is actually a police officer, wakes up and sees the fake police officer, who is actually the real robber, asleep. They then rejoice in their mistaken identities and the confusion is resolved happily.

=== Sudah Pasti Tahan ===
The story revolves around the trio (Dono, Kasino, and Indro) along with two beautiful girls, Linda and Christin, who manage to move out of their dormitory to live with them. Linda is Kasino's girlfriend, while Christin is dating Indro. The five of them are appointed as judges for a beach queen contest by a producer. One of the contestants tries to flirt with Dono, Kasino, and Indro, which infuriates Linda and Christin. In retaliation, Linda and Christin prank the trio as payback for the contestant's advances.

=== Bisa Naik Bisa Turun ===
In this film, the Warkop trio applies for a job and undergoes training to become security guards (satpam), where they unexpectedly receive training from Diding Boneng, who is actually a patient from a mental hospital. Later on, they secure a job at a company by disguising themselves as women, as the company specifically requires female employees. Their entire career journey ends in a hilariously chaotic manner.

This film is showing a famous quote "tertawalah sebelum tertawa itu dilarang" (please laugh before laughing is forbidden) in ending scene instead of "sekian" (The End) or "sampai jumpa lagi" (See You Later) for the first time. This become a common for the next films (except Bebas Aturan Main). Indro explained that the slogan 'please laugh before laughing is forbidden' emerged when his personnel felt worried because the comedy they presented was considered dangerous to some parties, especially during New Order era.

=== Masuk Kena Keluar Kena ===
Dono, Kasino, and Indro accidentally stumble upon an unknown island inhabited entirely by beautiful women, except for the Chief and his three chubby daughters. They are forced to escape from this paradise island as they are about to be married off to the Chief's daughters. Back home, Dono meets Merry. As usual, Dono, Kasino, Indro, Merry, Wenny, and Nia play on the beach with bikini-clad women, causing chaos in their relationships. Among the chaos, a man dressed in Arab attire arrives with his bodyguard, claiming that Merry is already engaged to him. Kasino ends up overpowering the bodyguard, who ends up in the hospital. The jokes continue in the hospital and back at home.

=== Salah Masuk ===
The trio Dono, Kasino, and Indro work as commercial film actors. Their story revolves around seeking funny effects everywhere they go. It starts with Dono's interest in a belly dancer named Selly Hilton, whom Indro tries to flirt with while Dono is away. However, it turns out the dancer is being used by someone else for extortion. Next, they film a beer commercial with a chubby actor named Yuli, who ends up causing chaos during the shoot. After that, a series of unrelated jokes and incidents follow in their usual comedic style.

=== Bagi-Bagi Dong ===
Dono lives with his two friends, Kasino and his girlfriend Kristine, and Indro with his girlfriend Yukem. Feeling jealous of not having a girlfriend himself, Dono visits a shaman who gives him a mouse. When the mouse causes chaos in the house, disrupting Kristine and Yukem, Dono seizes the opportunity to ask them all to leave. This allows him to await his new acquaintance, whom he plans to charm at home. Kristine and Yukem ask Dono, Kasino, and Indro to catch the mouse. Dono catches the mouse but Kasino convinces him to keep it a secret so they can spend the night with Kristine and Yukem. Various humorous incidents follow, such as Kasino and Indro accidentally getting scalded with hot water in a basin, and later being pranked by dr. Diding Boneng at the hospital. Dono's luck takes a turn when he finds a wallet full of money at the mall and meets Yulieta, his ex-girlfriend, who is out with her uncle. They dine together at a restaurant, only to discover that the wallet Dono found belongs to Yulieta's uncle.

=== Bebas Aturan Main ===
The story of this film begins with Dono, Kasino, and Indro losing their pants while using a public restroom at an entertainment venue. In their panic, Dono hastily grabs the pants of an elderly man using the adjacent toilet. The man is shocked to see Dono, Kasino, and Indro taking his pants and becomes furious, causing them to quickly flee the scene. Later, it is revealed that the elderly man whose pants they stole is Pak Leo, the father of Lisa, Yuli, and Nela, who are the girlfriends of Dono, Kasino, and Indro respectively. This incident sets off a series of comedic mishaps among them. For instance, Dono decides to disguise himself as a Michael Jackson statue to find out more about Pak Leo and his personality. Other hilarious situations ensue as they try to navigate through the complicated and absurd circumstances they find themselves in. The story is filled with humorous situations and confusion stemming from their unintended initial mishap in the public restroom.

=== Saya Duluan Dong ===
Dono, Kasino, and Indro work as waiters at a restaurant owned by Yuli's parents, who is Kasino's girlfriend. Their job is not just ordinary waiting tables but specifically to handle the antics of a rival restaurant owner named Pak Soleh, who enjoys disturbing Yuli's father's restaurant. The ups and downs they face dealing with Pak Soleh's antics lead to physical comedy, like taking turns catching mice that fall from the attic, among other things. Pak Soleh's misdeeds are eventually exposed by journalists and the police. He is arrested, and Kasino and his friends cheer triumphantly. However, Pak Soleh then stages a magic show where in the final act, he asks for the wallets of the audience, including the Warkop DKI trio themselves. This angers Dono, Kasino, and Indro, who demand their wallets back, but all their efforts fail. Eventually, their wallets are returned by a thug but are found empty. The trio tries to demand their money back from Pak Soleh, but their attempts are futile. Instead, they receive a peculiar repayment from Pak Soleh—a car shaped like a ship, which they end up driving into a lake after boarding it, initially mistaking it for Pak Soleh's Jeep. This sequence of events showcases the comedic misadventures and challenges faced by Dono, Kasino, and Indro in their efforts to combat Pak Soleh's disruptive behavior at Yuli's family restaurant.

=== Pencet Sana Pencet Sini ===
Dono, Indro, and Kasino are very eager to own a car, but they don't have the money for it. When Dono's uncle, Dewo Sastro, visits, they see an opportunity to ask for a car. However, Dewo Sastro is extremely stingy and refuses Dono's request. Determined not to give up, they come up with a plan with the help of their friends—a fake kidnapping of Dono orchestrated by a real criminal, Mata Satu, who happens to know Indro. The criminal demands a ransom from Dewo Sastro, an amount sufficient to buy a car. However, Mata Satu increases the ransom far beyond what was initially agreed upon. Dono is actually kidnapped and threatened with real harm if the demands are not met. Despite the dire situation, Dewo Sastro remains unwilling to pay the ransom. In a desperate move, Kasino, Indro, and their female friends set out to rescue Dono. Eventually, Dewo Sastro changes his mind and surprises Dono with a luxurious car as a reward for successfully capturing Mata Satu. The story humorously portrays the trio's antics and their unconventional methods to achieve their goal of owning a car, intertwined with the dynamics of family relationships and the consequences of their misadventures.

This series also marked the last ever Warkop DKI film since all of them agreed not to act in films anymore because at the same time, Indonesian film business was also sluggish due to the many adult-themed films and being invaded by imported films. Then Warkop DKI decided to shifted their way into comedy sitcom that aired on television during period 1996 - 2001 and also marked the end of their glory era because 2 of them were died (Kasino died on December 18, 1997, while Dono followed him 4 years later on December 30, 2001).

== Docudrama film ==
No.	Year(s)	Title	Director	Writer(s)	Producer(s)	Production house	Ref.
1	1981	Untukmu Indonesiaku	Ami Prijono	Ikranagara	Harris Lasmana	Nusantara Film	

== Controversy ==
Some of the Warkop films (especially films under banner Soraya Intercine Films) are using The Pink Panther Song as a music score without permission from the original artist, Henry Mancini. This is also the reason why Warkop films are unable to distribute internationally.
