= Dono (comedian) =

Indonesian actor and comedian (1951–2001)

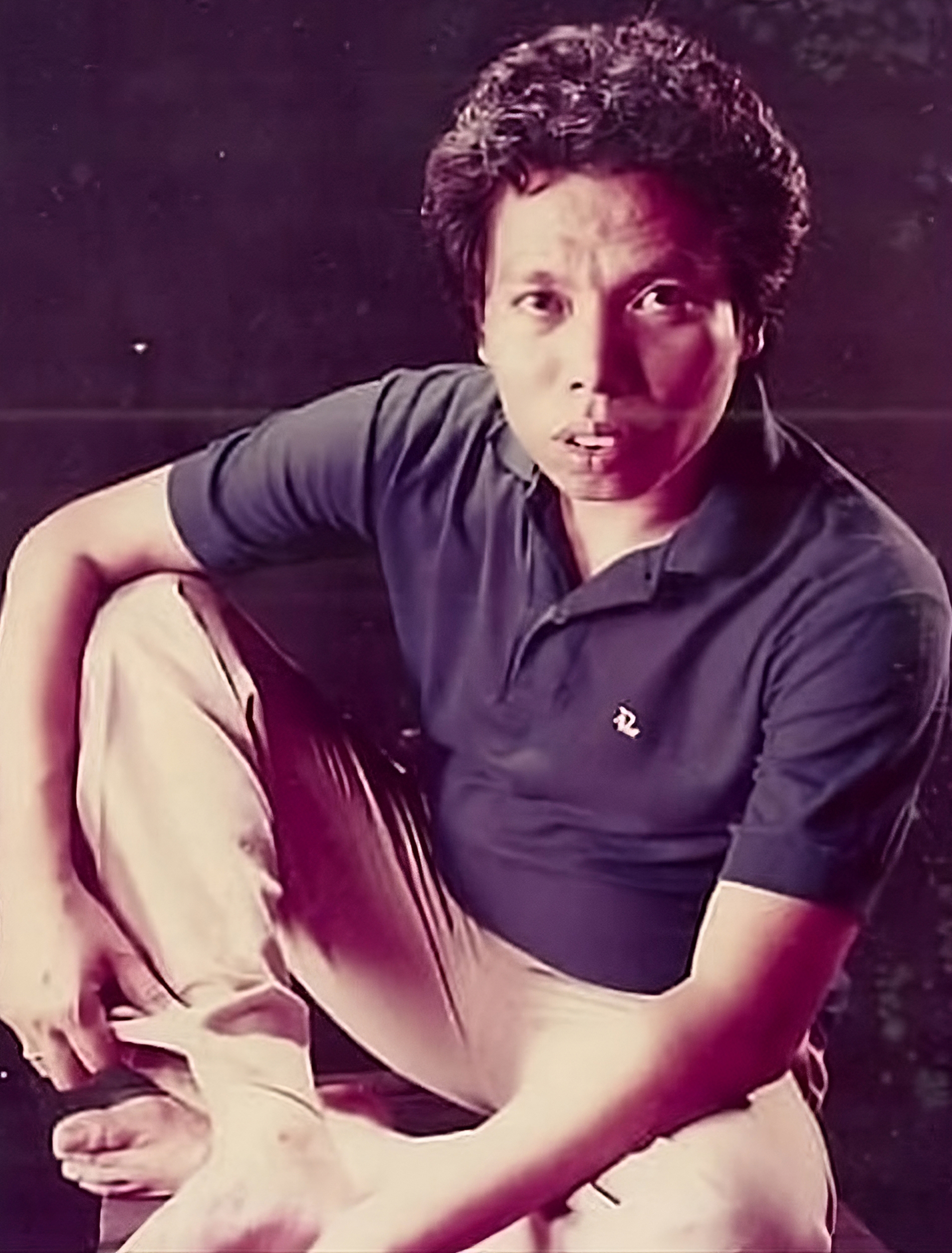
- Dono in circa 1990s
- Born: Wahjoe Sardono; 30 September 1951; Delanggu, Klaten, Central Java, Indonesia
- Died: 30 December 2001 (aged 50); Jakarta, Indonesia
- Burial place: Tanah Kusir Public Cemetery, Kebayoran Lama, South Jakarta
- Education: University of Indonesia
- Occupations: Actor; comedian; lecturer
- Years active: 1978–2001
- Known for: Member of Warkop
- Spouse: Titi Kusumawardhani (m. 1977; died 1999)
- Children: 3

Wahjoe Sardono (Indonesian: [wahju sardɔnɔ], EYD: Wahyu Sardono, 30 September 1951 – 30 December 2001), known mononymously as Dono or Dono Warkop, was an Indonesian actor, comedian, and lecturer. He gained fame as a member of the comedy group Warkop. Born in Delanggu, Klaten, Dono began his career while still a student at the University of Indonesia (UI), where he worked as a caricaturist and social activist. He later became a teaching assistant for sociology professor Selo Soemardjan, teaching several general lectures and group sessions alongside Paulus Wirutomo.

After graduating from college, Dono began to gain popularity with the Warkop group, starring in 34 comedy films from 1980 to 1995. They furthered their success with a television series that ran from 1996 to 2001. Additionally, Dono was active as a novelist and frequently wrote articles on social issues for the mass media. He died on 30 December 2001, due to lung cancer.

== Early life ==
Dono was born as Wahjoe Sardono in Delanggu, Klaten, Central Java. His father, Tjitro Soedijono, served as a police officer, and his mother was Soenarmi. Among four siblings, Dono was the only son. He interpreted the significance of his name as follows: "Wahyu" symbolizes God's grace, "Sar" denotes being born in the Great Month of the Javanese calendar (which corresponds with the month of Dhu al-Hijja in the Islamic calendar), and "Dono" means gift. Therefore, his name translates to "God's grace as the greatest gift".

Dono started his education at SD Negeri 1 Kebon Dalem for elementary school and later attended SMP Negeri 2 Klaten. As a child, he often found himself in fights provoked by friends, but mainly defended himself and avoided further escalation. Once, he was swept away in a river while returning home after watching a night-long wayang kulit show. For high school, Dono commuted daily by bicycle from Klaten to SMA Negeri 3 Surakarta, covering tens of kilometers. It was during this period that his leadership qualities emerged, leading to his appointment as head of the Student Council (OSIS). Initially aiming to become a doctor, Dono eventually shifted focus to social sciences after not meeting the requirements. He then set his sights on becoming a journalist. During this time, he actively pursued his passion for drawing cartoons, creating caricatures, and writing poems, hoping to see them published in various newspapers.

== Career ==
=== Early career ===
In 1971, upon graduating from high school, Dono moved to Jakarta to pursue his studies at the Faculty of Social Sciences, University of Indonesia (UI), majoring in sociology. His younger sister, Rani Toersilaningsih, who later became a lecturer at the Faculty of Economics UI, mentioned that Dono chose sociology because he had a keen interest in observing people and environments, which he later reflected in his writings and caricatures. Initially, Dono's father preferred him to study political science, but Dono declined. However, after some discussion, his father eventually supported his choice on the condition that Dono remained committed and succeeded in his studies. During his time at the university, Dono became close friends with Paulus Wirutomo, despite being in different academic years. They both independently established student magazines that operated outside of campus bureaucracy. Funding for these magazines came from their own pockets, and although they did not collaborate on the same publication, their competition fueled their creativity.

Following his academic pursuits, Dono actively contributed to several newspapers, including El Bahar, Tribun, and Salemba, where he worked primarily as a columnist and caricaturist. Both newspapers ceased publication in 1974. In 1975, Dono was invited to join the radio program Obrolan Santai di Warung Kopi Prambors along with Kasino, Nanu Moeljono, and Rudy Badil. With the addition of Indro in 1976, they officially formed the group known as "Warkop Prambors". Their program aired every Thursday night and became popular for discussing current topics, particularly politics and social issues. During his university years, Dono also participated in the University of Indonesia's Mountaineering Student Group (Mapala UI) alongside Kasino and Nanu. This shared interest in nature and adventure was later depicted in several Warkop films.

=== Becoming Selo Soemardjan's assistant ===
During his fifth year as a student at the University of Indonesia, Dono was appointed as a teaching assistant by Selo Soemardjan, a renowned sociology professor. He reunited with Paulus Wirutomo, who had been appointed earlier as a teaching assistant. Together, they shared responsibilities teaching general lectures and group classes. The general lectures aimed to introduce new students to fundamental sociological concepts directly taught by Soemardjan. In group classes, Dono and Wirutomo led the sessions. When Soemardjan couldn't attend the general lectures, Dono and Wirutomo took charge. Their appointment as teaching assistants underscored their academic prowess and dedication, as Soemardjan was discerning in granting such opportunities.

As a lecturer, Dono was known for his strict and disciplined approach. Interestingly, one of his future Warkop colleagues, Nanu Moeljono, was a student in Dono's class. Nanu, however, did not pass the course taught by Dono.

=== Activism activities ===
In student movements, Dono was recognized for his outspoken criticism. In January 1974, he participated in the infamous Malari incident, where he and fellow students protested against Japanese economic dominance in Indonesia. The demonstration culminated in the arrest of several University of Indonesia students, including Hariman Siregar, who was then the Student Council chairman. Dono's boldness extended to his caricatures, which often critiqued the New Order government. This drew the attention of intelligence teams and police, who visited his parents' home in Delanggu. His father calmly clarified that Dono's intentions were to reveal truths rather than to undermine the government.

In 1998, Dono once again joined student demonstrations, this time actively defending Atma Jaya Catholic University of Indonesia. When security forces attempted to enter the campus, Dono bravely confronted them with only a fire hose, safeguarding thousands of students seeking refuge inside. According to former Kompas journalist Budiarto Shambazy, Dono played a pivotal role in the May 1998 demonstrations that ultimately led to President Suharto's resignation. He contributed by framing speeches, organizing visits to Parliament, and strategizing various student-led protests.

=== The peak of success with Warkop ===
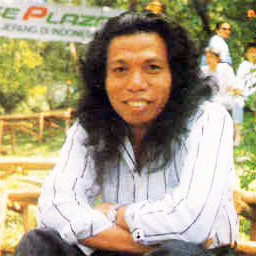
Dono in 1988, with the long hair appearance that appears in Jodoh Boleh Diatur, Malu Malu Mau, and Godain Kita Dong.

Due to his busy schedule, Dono once neglected his thesis, which focused on educational equity in his hometown of Delanggu. Titled Hubungan Status Sosial Ekonomi Keluarga dengan Prestasi Murid di Sekolah: Studi Kasus SMP Negeri Desa Delanggu, he successfully defended it during a research session in 1978. After graduating with a sociology degree, Dono transitioned away from his lecturing job to pursue entertainment with the Warkop comedy group. During this time, Warkop expanded their presence beyond radio broadcasts to television through the show Terminal Musikal, produced by Mus Mualim and aired on TVRI. They also received numerous invitations to perform outside the city.

In 1980, Warkop released their first film titled Mana Tahaaan... which enjoyed tremendous success during its theatrical run. From 1980 to 1995, the Warkop Prambors, later renamed as Warkop DKI, starred in 34 comedy films and one docudrama. Typically, Warkop released two films annually, timed for Eid Al Fitr and the Christmas-New Year holidays. However, international marketing of Warkop films faced challenges due to copyright issues, particularly concerning the unauthorized use of Henry Mancini's instrumental song The Pink Panther Theme. Additionally, Warkop produced 12 compilation albums featuring comedy and songs, collaborating on two of them with the Pancaran Sinar Petromak and Srimulat groups.

Despite his success as a comedian, Dono once declined a scholarship offer for postgraduate studies in the United States to avoid disrupting the formation of the Warkop group. Behind the scenes, he had a three-year dispute with Kasino from 1988 to 1990, centered around differing visions for Warkop's future. Nonetheless, they maintained professionalism while Indro acted as a mediator between them.

Outside of his entertainment career, Dono maintained an active presence as a freelance writer for various print media outlets and frequently participated as a guest lecturer in public lectures organized by universities. He also pursued his passion for cartooning under the pen name "Titi Kusumawardhani," derived from his wife's name. In 1987, Dono published his first novel titled Balada Paijo, which depicts the life of a village youth navigating the challenges of urban life. By the time of his death in 2001, Dono had authored five novels. His final novel, Senggol Kiri Senggol Kanan, published in 2009, shifted focus to marital issues faced by an employee, diverging from his earlier themes of youth life.

Additionally, Dono ventured into film production and screenwriting, notably in the 1991 film Peluk Daku dan Lepaskan, where he adopted the pseudonym "Ario Damar" derived from his sons' names, Andika Aria Sena (nicknamed "Ario") and Damar Canggih Wicaksono. Following the release of Pencet Sana Pencet Sini in 1995, Dono, Kasino, and Indro collectively decided to cease making films to show solidarity with the Indonesian film industry. During this period, the industry faced challenges from an oversupply of adult-themed films and competition from international cinema. Subsequently, the Warkop group transitioned to television, continuing with the series Warkop DKI, later renamed Warkop Millenium after Kasino's death in November 1997. Dono remained involved in the series until his death in 2001, contributing to its enduring popularity in Indonesian entertainment.

== Style ==
=== As actor ===
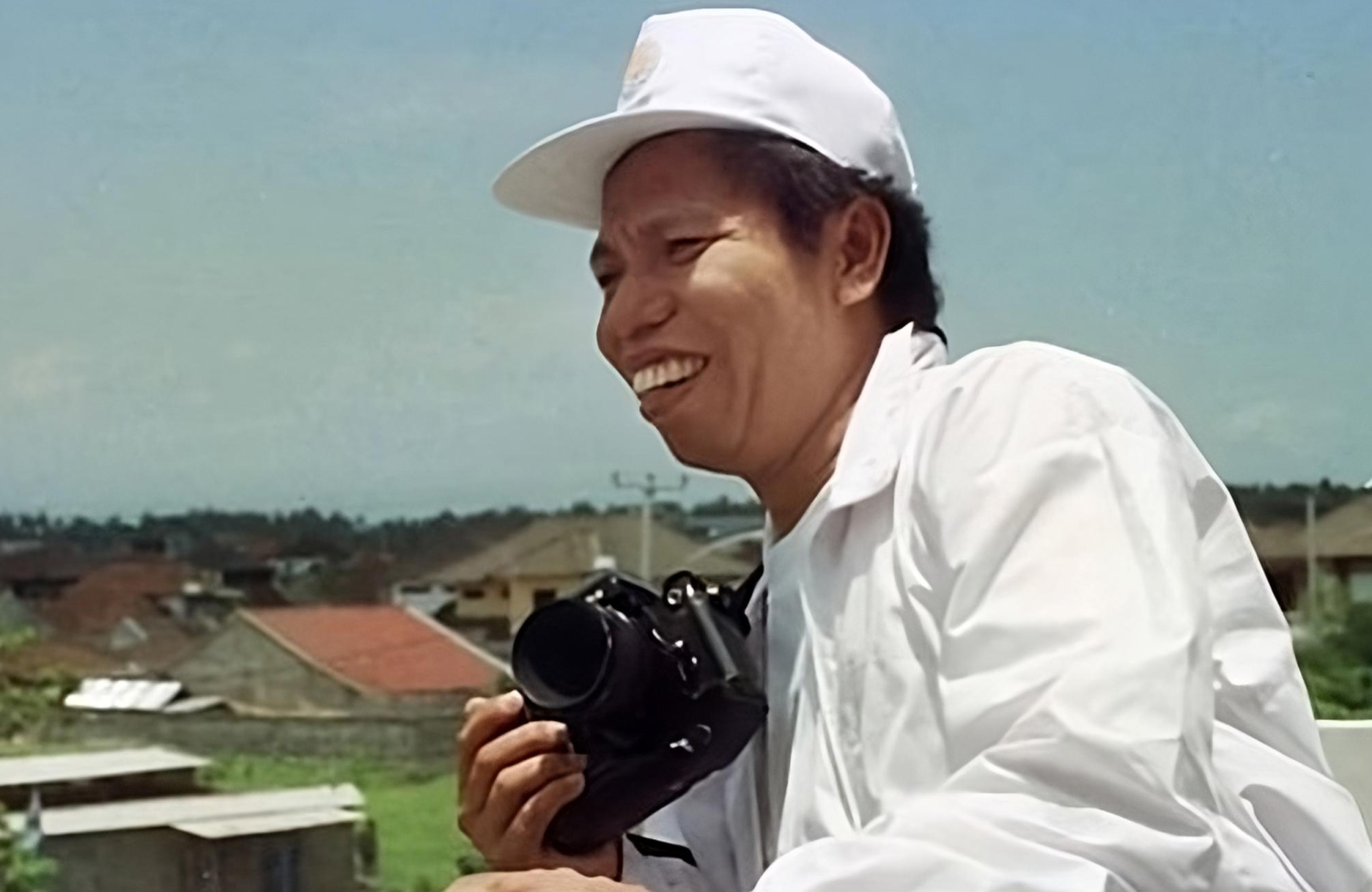

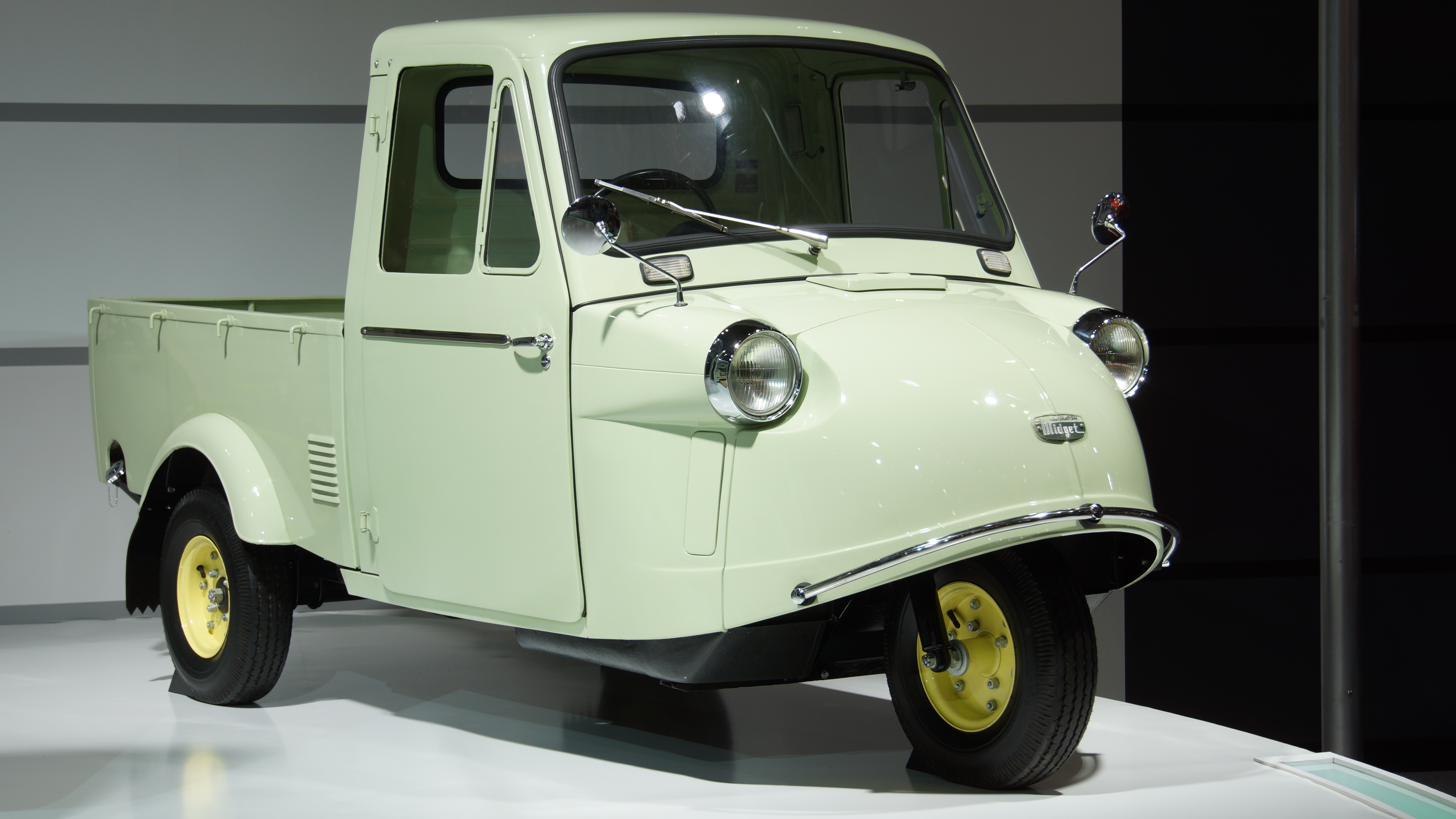
Dono's face is often compared to a bemo which is based on the Daihatsu Midget car.

Early in his career, Dono portrayed the character Slamet, initially on Radio Prambors, embodying a simple and naive Javanese man. This characterization continued when he transitioned to acting in films, where Slamet appeared in the initial trilogy: Mana Tahaaan..., Gengsi Dong, and Gede Rasa. In Gengsi Dong, Slamet's full name was revealed as Raden Mas Ngabei Slamet Condrowirawatikto Edi Pranoto Joyosentiko Mangundirjo Kusumo, hailing from a prosperous farming family in his village. Gede Rasa further explored Slamet's challenges after dropping out of college and adapting to life in Jakarta.

When the production of Warkop films shifted to Parkit Film and later Soraya Intercine Films, Dono began portraying a character named "Dono". Dono's character was consistently portrayed as unlucky in daily life but surprisingly fortunate in attracting beautiful women. In a humorous 1995 interview, Dono noted that excessive misfortune for his character might deter audiences, hence the frequent pairing with attractive actresses. Initially dubbed "Si Bemo" early in his film career due to his resemblance to the bemo public transport vehicles, Dono initially found the nickname offensive when director Nawi Ismail coined it during the filming of Mana Tahaaan... However, he eventually embraced it as a comedic element inherent to his profession.

Indro, another member of Warkop, revealed that Dono was the creative force behind the Slamet and later Dono characters. Dono deliberately crafted these personas, drawing inspiration from his intellectual background. Indro emphasized Dono's perfectionism in portraying these roles, noting his rigorous research before performances or scriptwriting sessions. Dono often declined spontaneous comedy, preferring thorough preparation as a mark of his commitment. Despite their comedic triumphs, Warkop briefly diverged from their typical formula by collaborating with directors Chaerul Umam and Ami Prijono on more serious-themed films like Sama Juga Bohong and Jodoh Boleh Diatur. However, these experiments fell short of box office expectations, acknowledged by Kasino, who attributed Warkop's market challenges to their portrayal of women as mere adornments.

Renowned filmmaker Garin Nugroho lauded Dono's ability to inject a distinctive charm into every Warkop film. Despite criticisms of predictable plotlines, Nugroho suggested audiences continued to relish the films due to Dono's portrayal as the hapless victim of Kasino and Indro's antics. Author Wiwid Prasetiyo underscored Dono's pivotal role in Warkop's identity, noting his absence was deeply felt following his death compared to Kasino's. Reflecting on Dono's comedic style, author Darminto M. Sudarmo noted his public humor often intertwined with incisive political satire, a departure from his on-screen roles. Tempo magazine likened Dono's comedic delivery to Benyamin Sueb and Charlie Chaplin in 2005, highlighting Benyamin's mastery of verbal wit in comedic performances.

=== As writer ===
Dono used mass media as a platform for social criticism, distinct from his naive film portrayals. Through his articles, he presented fresh and intelligent ideas, believing humor could effectively convey social critiques beyond mere entertainment. He observed a general lack of interest in reading among Indonesians and opposed the practice of comedians relying on scripted material borrowed from others rather than originating from personal insights.

As a novelist starting in the late 1980s, Dono's works naturally incorporated humor, reflecting the popular trend of humorous-themed books of the era. Despite this, he maintained a critical stance towards media's role in delivering social messages. Writer Putu Wijaya, in his review for Tempo magazine, praised Dono's skillful storytelling and his spontaneous writing style but critiqued his tendency to present overly dominant main characters and portray female characters as secondary to the narrative. In analyzing Dono's novels like Dua Batang Ilalang, Ayuni Rianty and Etmi Hardi noted his neutral writing style despite satirizing the New Order regime, aiming for impartiality in depicting student-government encounters. Writer Udo Z. Karzi contrasted his difficulty following Warkop films, which he found lacking in humor, with his ability to engage with the narratives in Dono's novels. Saddam Cahyo, reviewing Senggol Kiri Senggol Kanan, highlighted Dono's indirect critique of the government regime through humor, embodying the slogan "laugh before laughter is banned" in his literary works.

== Personal life ==
=== Family ===
Dono first encountered his future wife, Titi Kusumawardhani, during their time as students at the Faculty of Social Sciences at University of Indonesia. Interestingly, long before Dono attended junior high school, his family participated in a supernatural game called "jailangkung", seeking insights about Dono's future spouse. The mystical doll from the game mentioned Titi Kusumawardhani from Madiun as his destined partner. As fate would have it, Dono later found and married Kusumawardhani exactly as predicted by the jailangkung. Dono and Kusumawardhani married in 1977 and were blessed with three children: Andika Aria Sena, Damar Canggih Wicaksono, and Satrio Sarwo Trengginas. Kusumawardhani died in 1999 due to breast cancer.

=== Illness and death ===
Dono's health began deteriorating in 2000 when he was diagnosed with tuberculosis, which required frequent hospitalizations. During this time, a tumor was discovered in his buttocks, leading to surgery for its removal at Kramat Hospital in Central Jakarta in September 2000. Unfortunately, by 2001, it was determined that the tumor had metastasized to his lungs and liver, resulting in a diagnosis of lung cancer.

Throughout November 2001, Dono underwent extensive examinations due to the advanced stage of his lung cancer. On December 29, 2001, he was admitted to Saint Carolus Hospital in critical condition. Despite efforts to stabilize his health, Dono experienced several critical periods and died on Sunday, December 30, 2001. His funeral took place at Tanah Kusir Public Cemetery the following day. Initially, plans were made to bury Dono in Surakarta, but these were reconsidered as all three of his children lived in Jakarta.

== Legacy ==
Until now, Warkop films are often referred to as "Dono films". Indro, representing the Warkop team, once attempted to investigate this phenomenon by consulting a psychologist. Eventually, Indro concluded that the name "Dono" is memorable because it consists of two syllables and shares initials with "DKI", associated with Warkop DKI. Some media outlets have also drawn comparisons between Dono and the British comedian Rowan Atkinson, noting similarities in their educated backgrounds and frequent portrayal of naive and foolish characters in both films and television series.

Dedi Gumelar, also known as Miing from the comedy group Bagito, remembers Dono as a figure who was simple, practical, and highly spontaneous. Deddy Mizwar described Dono as a comedian who was irreplaceable and acknowledged his significant contribution to the development of comedy in Indonesia. Taufik Savalas considered Dono, along with his Warkop colleagues Kasino and Indro, as mentors when he started his career as a comedian. Eva Arnaz described Dono as an intelligent and humble man, while Nurul Arifin regarded him as highly sensitive regarding social issues. During Dono's 70th birthday commemoration in 2021, solo comedian Ernest Prakasa reminisced about Dono as a comedian who not only entertained but also spoke truthfully, particularly in critiquing the government.

Dono's legacy was revived in the Warkop DKI Reborn film series produced by Falcon Pictures. In the first and second films, Dono was portrayed by Abimana Aryasatya, who expressed feeling "something extraordinary" while playing the role. Dono's family also praised Aryasatya for his strong resemblance to Dono. In the third and fourth films, Aliando Syarief took over the role from Aryasatya. Syarief prepared for his role by losing weight and altering his appearance, including shaving his eyebrows and eyelashes.

In 2021, the emergence of a comedy group named Warkopi briefly stirred the public, perceived as imitating Warkop DKI. One of its members, Sepriadi Chaniago, gained attention for his resemblance to Dono. The group disbanded after receiving a legal warning from the Warkop DKI institution, holder of the commercial rights to the Warkop comedy group.

During the 2024 Indonesian presidential election campaign, presidential candidate Ganjar Pranowo recalled Dono through a T-shirt with the inscription "Join Us We Fight For A Clean Government". This T-shirt was previously worn by Dono during the Malari demonstration in 1974.

== Bibliography ==
Year	Title
1987	Balada Paijo
1988	Cemara-Cemara Kampus
1999	Bila Satpam Bercinta
1999	Dua Batang Ilalang
2009	Senggol Kiri Senggol Kanan

== Discography ==
Year	Album title	Note(s)
1979	Cangkir Kopi	
1979	Warung Tenda	
1979	Warkop PSP HUT TVRI ke-16	Collaboration with Pancaran Sinar Petromak
1980	Mana Tahaaan...	
1981	Dokter Masuk Desa	
1982	Gerhana Asmara	Collaboration with Srimulat
1983	Semua Bisa Diatur	
1984	Pokoknya Betul	
1985	Pingin Melek Hukum	
1986	Sama Juga Bohong	
1987	Makin Tipis Makin Asyik	
1987	Kunyanyikan Judulku	

== Filmography ==
=== Film ===
As actor

Year	Title	Role	Notes
1980	Mana Tahaaan...	Slamet	Warkop group's first feature film
1980	Gengsi Dong	Slamet	
1981	GeEr - Gede Rasa	Slamet	
1981	Pintar Pintar Bodoh	Dono	The first Warkop film under Parkit Film production
1981	Untukmu Indonesiaku	Dono	Non-comedy documentary film produced by Guruh Soekarnoputra
1981	Manusia 6.000.000 Dollar	Dono	
1982	IQ Jongkok	Dono	
1982	Setan Kredit	Dono	
1982	Dongkrak Antik	Dono	
1983	CHIPS	Dono	
1983	Maju Kena Mundur Kena	Dono	
1984	Pokoknya Beres	Dono	
1984	Tahu Diri Dong	Dono	
1984	Itu Bisa Diatur	Dono	
1985	Kesempatan Dalam Kesempitan	Dono	
1985	Gantian Dong	Dono	
1986	Sama Juga Bohong	Dono	
1986	Atas Boleh Bawah Boleh	Dono	The first Warkop film under Soraya Intercine Films production
1987	Depan Bisa Belakang Bisa	Dono	
1987	Makin Lama Makin Asyik	Dono	
1988	Saya Suka Kamu Punya	Dono	Also a story writer and scriptwriter
1988	Jodoh Boleh Diatur	Dono	
1989	Malu-Malu Mau	Dono	
1989	Godain Kita Dong	Dono	
1990	Sabar Dulu Doong...!	Dono	
1990	Mana Bisa Tahan	Dono	
1991	Lupa Aturan Main	Dono	
1991	Sudah Pasti Tahan	Dono	
1992	Bisa Naik Bisa Turun	Dono	
1992	Masuk Kena Keluar Kena	Dono	
1993	Salah Masuk	Dono	
1993	Bagi-Bagi Dong	Dono	
1994	Bebas Aturan Main	Dono	
1994	Saya Duluan Dong	Dono	
1995	Pencet Sana Pencet Sini	Dono	Warkop group's last feature film

As producer

Year	Title	Note	Ref.
1991	Peluk Daku dan Lepaskan	Also a story writer using the pen name Ario Damar	

=== TV series ===
Year	Title	Role
1996–1997	Warkop DKI	Dono
1999–2000	Warkop Millenium	Dono
