= Indro (disambiguation) =

Indro may refer to:

== People ==
- Indro Montanelli, an Italian journalist, historian, and writer.
- Indro Olumets, a former Estonian footballer who played as an offensive-minded midfielder.
- Indro (comedian), an Indonesian actor and comedian.

== Places ==
- Indooroopilly Shopping Centre (colloquially Indro), a major regional shopping centre in the western suburb of Indooroopilly in the City of Brisbane, Queensland, Australia.
- Indro Montanelli Public Gardens, a major and historic city park in Milan, Italy.

== Technology ==
- Indro robot, a humanoid robot built in India.
