= Kasino (comedian) =

Indonesian actor and comedian (1950–1997)

- Born: Kasino Hadiwibowo; 15 September 1950; Gombong, Kebumen Regency, Central Java, Indonesia
- Died: 18 December 1997 (aged 47); Jakarta, Indonesia
- Burial place: Giri Tama Cemetery, Tajurhalang, Bogor Regency, West Java
- Education: University of Indonesia
- Occupations: Actor; comedian
- Years active: 1973–1997
- Known for: Member of Warkop

Kasino Hadiwibowo (15 September 1950 – 18 December 1997), better known by his mononym Kasino, was an Indonesian actor and comedian. He was a member of the comedy group Warkop. Born in Gombong, Kebumen, Kasino displayed an interest in humor from his school days. His career as a comedian began to take off while he was studying at the University of Indonesia. Alongside Nanu Moeljono and Rudy Badil, Kasino became a host of the radio show Obrolan Malam Jumat on Prambors FM, which aired every Thursday night. This show later became the precursor to the Warkop group.

With Warkop, Kasino reached the peak of his success by starring in 34 comedy films from 1980 to 1995. He also appeared in the television series Warkop DKI, produced in 1996 and 1997, which later became his final professional appearance. Kasino died in December 1997 due to a brain tumor.

== Early life ==
Kasino Hadiwibowo was born in Gombong, Kebumen, Central Java, to parents Notopramono and Kasiyem. He was the nephew of Hoegeng Iman Santoso, who served as the Chief of the Indonesian National Police from 1968 to 1971. Kasino's early life involved frequent moves due to his father's employment with PNKA (now PT. KAI), the Indonesian national railway company. He initially attended school in Padalarang, Bandung, until the third grade, after which he moved to SD Budi Utomo in Jakarta. His junior high education was completed at SMP Negeri 51 Jakarta. For high school, Kasino relocated to Cirebon following his father's assignment, attending SMA Negeri 2 Cirebon, before returning to Jakarta to finish his education at SMA Negeri 22 Jakarta. Throughout his schooling, Kasino developed a keen interest in mathematics and was noted for his devoutness, influenced by his parents' encouragement in Qira'at (reading and reciting Al-Quran).

Upon graduating from high school, Kasino continued his education at the University of Indonesia's Faculty of Social Sciences, where he pursued a degree in Business Administration. He successfully graduated with a bachelor's degree in 1978.

== Career ==
=== Early career ===
Kasino has had an interest in humor since his childhood, and he acknowledged that his inspiration came from the comedy group Trio Los Gilos, which included Bing Slamet, Mang Cepot, and Mang Udel. In 1973, along with his fellow students at university, Nanu Moeljono, Kasino performed comedy sketches at "Perkampungan Universitas Indonesia", a student camping event in Cibubur. Their humorous performances caught the attention of Temmy Lesanpura, a senior student at UI who was already a leader at Prambors FM. Lesanpura invited them to host a show together with Rudy Badil called Obrolan Malam Jumat (Omamat). The show aired every Thursday night from 20:30 to 21:15 WIB. Its theme involved discussing political and social conditions in the country in a relaxed style.

As a campus activist, Kasino felt aligned with the show's theme. He immediately gathered various data and processed it for weekly discussions. Additionally, he often created riddles by blending traditional Indonesian folklore with modern humorous stories. However, these topics were later considered outdated, prompting Kasino to think hard about finding new strategies. He then attempted to merge comedy with dangdut music, drawing inspiration from his experience attending dangdut festivals at UI with some friends. As a result, they transformed Western songs into dangdut-style tunes. Kasino's friends later formed separate music and comedy groups, each named Pancaran Sinar Petromak and Pengantar Minum Racun.

=== Success with Warkop ===
In 1975, Dono began to join as a host, followed a year later by Indro. With the arrival of Dono and Indro, the program Omamat changed its name to Obrolan Santai di Warung Kopi Prambors (later more commonly known as "Warkop Prambors"). By then, their radio show had gained many fans, and they were even invited to perform outside the city. In 1976, Kasino briefly served as the manager of a specialized clinic in Rawamangun, East Jakarta, owned by his in-laws. He managed the clinic for one and a half years before choosing to resign due to his increasing commitment to activities with Warkop. In 1978, shortly after graduating from university, Kasino faced a decision between continuing his career as a comedian or following his parents' wish for him to become a civil servant. Ultimately, Kasino chose to pursue his career as a comedian.

In 1979, the Warkop Prambors group released a compilation album of their comedy sketches and songs, which were actually recordings from live performances in Palembang and Pontianak. A year later, Warkop made their debut on the big screen with their first film titled Mana Tahaaan... The film achieved significant success during its theatrical run. From 1980 to 1995, the comedy group Warkop Prambors, later renamed Warkop DKI, starred in 34 comedy films and one docudrama. They also released 12 compilation albums of comedy sketches and songs, two of which were collaborations with the Pancaran Sinar Petromak and Srimulat groups. In the early years of his acting career, Kasino was often nicknamed "Seki" by his friends in the film production team due to his distinctive flat nose.

Behind the scenes, Kasino played the role of the "leader" within the Warkop group. He acted as the spokesperson and negotiator for strategic planning and business concepts adopted by Warkop. Differences in strategy once led to a three-year rift with Dono, from 1988 to 1990. Nevertheless, they maintained professionalism while working together, with Indro acting as a mediator between them.

After the release of the film Pencet Sana Pencet Sini in 1995, Kasino, along with Dono and Indro, agreed to cease making films as a sign of solidarity with the Indonesian film industry. During this period, the national film business was struggling due to the prevalence of adult-themed films and the influx of imported movies, particularly from Hollywood, Bollywood, and Hong Kong. Subsequently, the Warkop group shifted their focus to television media through the Warkop DKI series. The series was produced between 1996 and 1997, marking Kasino's final professional appearance in his career.

== Style ==
While hosting the show on Prambors FM, Kasino was known for his ability to portray several different characters. Among the characters he frequently portrayed were Mas Bei, depicted as a Javanese; Acing/Acong, portrayed as a Chinese; Sanwani, depicted as a Betawi; and Buyung, portrayed as a Minang. When he first started acting in films, Kasino played the character Sanwani in three early films: Mana Tahaaan..., Gengsi Dong, and Gede Rasa. Sanwani's character was described as a know-it-all youth with a hint of arrogance.

When the film production of Warkop was taken over by Parkit Film and later by Soraya Intercine Films, Kasino then portrayed the character "Kasino". In these films, he was depicted as an idealistic figure with brilliant ideas, but often these ideas backfired due to his know-it-all attitude and habit of underestimating others. Additionally, he occasionally appeared as a leader figure, as seen in films like Manusia 6.000.000 Dollar and Depan Bisa Belakang Bisa.

Kasino was also known for his skill in composing and parodying song lyrics to add humor. This habit stemmed from his hobby of singing and parodying songs during his student days. He possessed a vocal technique that allowed him to easily sing various songs in languages such as Mandarin, Hindi, Arabic, and English. However, in his role as Acong or Acing, Kasino often parodied English songs by changing their lyrics into Mandarin. Singer Titiek Puspa once laughed upon learning that her song Saputangan had its lyrics altered by Kasino with additional English lyrics. According to Rudy Badil, Kasino frequently used song parodies to subtly critique the New Order government. This opinion was supported by musicians like Chrisye and Fariz RM, who viewed Kasino as an appropriate figure to criticize the Indonesian music industry, which they felt was in a poor condition during the 1980s.

== Personal life ==
=== Family ===
Kasino first met his future wife, Amarmini (commonly called Mieke), in 1974 at the University of Indonesia campus. Amarmini, who is of Balinese-Javanese descent, at that time also allowed Kasino to visit her house with the knowledge of Amarmini's mother. In 1976, despite not yet graduating from college, Kasino married Amarmini. Their marriage was officiated with Hoegeng Iman Santoso, Kasino's uncle, acting as the guardian. The couple was blessed with a daughter named Hanna.

=== Illness and death ===
Kasino's health began to show decline in November 1996. While hosting an event in Lembang, he suddenly collapsed. With the help of his colleagues, he was rushed to Bandung Adventist Hospital. X-ray examinations by doctors revealed evidence of brain tumor symptoms, and Kasino was advised to undergo chemotherapy. Kasino's daughter, Hanna, stated that her father's tumor likely originated from a mountain biking accident several years earlier. As a consequence of the chemotherapy process, Kasino had to take a hiatus from the Warkop DKI series, with the storyline focusing solely on Dono and Indro. Throughout 1997, Kasino's health fluctuated, but he remained undeterred. He attempted to make a comeback in the Warkop DKI series by wearing a wig to cover the baldness caused by the treatment.

In November 1997, Kasino's health condition worsened again, necessitating intensive care at Dr. Cipto Mangunkusumo Hospital. After nearly a month of treatment, Kasino eventually died at the age of 47 on 18 December 1997, after battling brain tumor for a year. His body was laid to rest at Giri Tama Cemetery, Tajurhalang, Bogor Regency, West Java.

== Legacy ==
Dedi Gumelar, also known as Miing, a member of the comedy group Bagito, remembers Kasino as someone who played a pivotal role in kickstarting his comedy career. Dedi mentioned that Kasino taught him the art and tricks of comedy and often provided financial assistance during difficult times. Actress Nurul Arifin viewed Kasino as a calming presence whenever they conversed. Musician Franki Raden recalled Kasino as someone who understood situations and conditions well. In 1986, when Raden got married, he invited Kasino to host the wedding reception. Initially hoping Kasino would entertain with his humorous style, Raden was surprised when Kasino opted for a formal approach upon learning that Raden's uncle had been his former college professor. Comedian Jimmy Gideon remembered Kasino for motivating him while serving as a judge in a national comedy competition held in 1986 at National University.

Kasino's persona was brought back in the Warkop DKI Reborn film series produced by Falcon Pictures. In the first and second films, Kasino was portrayed by Vino G. Bastian. Initially hesitant due to feeling dissimilar to Kasino, Bastian eventually accepted the challenging role, citing Kasino's unique traits, including his distinctive manner of speech, as particularly difficult to emulate. In the third and fourth films, Adipati Dolken replaced Bastian as Kasino. Dolken found the positive side of portraying Kasino, transforming his typically serious demeanor into a more cheerful one.

In 2021, the public was briefly captivated by the emergence of a comedy group named Warkopi, perceived as imitating Warkop DKI. One of its members, Alfred Dimas Kusnandi, was noted for his resemblance to Kasino. The group disbanded after receiving a cease and desist letter from the Warkop DKI institution, the commercial rights holder of the Warkop comedy group.

== Filmography ==
=== Film ===
Year	Title	Role	Notes
1980	Mana Tahaaan...	Sanwani	Warkop group's first feature film
1980	Gengsi Dong	Sanwani	
1981	GeEr - Gede Rasa	Sanwani	
1981	Pintar Pintar Bodoh	Kasino	The first Warkop film under Parkit Film production
1981	Untukmu Indonesiaku	Kasino	Non-comedy documentary film produced by Guruh Soekarnoputra
1981	Manusia 6.000.000 Dollar	Kasino	
1982	IQ Jongkok	Kasino	
1982	Setan Kredit	Kasino	
1982	Dongkrak Antik	Kasino	
1983	CHIPS	Kasino	
1983	Maju Kena Mundur Kena	Kasino	
1984	Pokoknya Beres	Kasino	
1984	Tahu Diri Dong	Kasino	
1984	Itu Bisa Diatur	Kasino	
1985	Kesempatan Dalam Kesempitan	Kasino	
1985	Gantian Dong	Kasino	
1986	Sama Juga Bohong	Kasino	
1986	Atas Boleh Bawah Boleh	Kasino	The first Warkop film under Soraya Intercine Films production
1987	Depan Bisa Belakang Bisa	Kasino	
1987	Makin Lama Makin Asyik	Kasino	
1988	Saya Suka Kamu Punya	Kasino	
1988	Jodoh Boleh Diatur	Kasino	
1989	Malu-Malu Mau	Kasino	
1989	Godain Kita Dong	Kasino	
1990	Sabar Dulu Doong...!	Kasino	
1990	Mana Bisa Tahan	Kasino	
1991	Lupa Aturan Main	Kasino	
1991	Sudah Pasti Tahan	Kasino	
1992	Bisa Naik Bisa Turun	Kasino	
1992	Masuk Kena Keluar Kena	Kasino	
1993	Salah Masuk	Kasino	
1993	Bagi-Bagi Dong	Kasino	
1994	Bebas Aturan Main	Kasino	
1994	Saya Duluan Dong	Kasino	
1995	Pencet Sana Pencet Sini	Kasino	Warkop group's last feature film

=== TV series ===
Year	Title	Role
1996–1997	Warkop DKI	Kasino

== See also ==
- List of people with brain tumors
