= George McTurnan Kahin =

American historian and political scientist

- Kahin as a visiting professor at Monash University in 1971
- Born: January 25, 1918; Baltimore, Maryland, U.S.
- Died: January 29, 2000 (aged 82); Rochester, New York, U.S.
- Education: Harvard University; Stanford University; Johns Hopkins University
- Scientific career
- Fields: History, political science
- Workplaces: Cornell University
- Doctoral advisor: Rupert Emerson
- Other academic advisors: Owen Lattimore
- Doctoral students: Benedict Anderson, Herbert Feith, Daniel Lev

George McTurnan Kahin (Note: Sometimes referred to as George Kahin or George McT. Kahin. Some, but fewer, sources may also cite him as George M. Kahin.) (January 25, 1918 – January 29, 2000) was an American historian and political scientist. He was one of the leading experts on Southeast Asia and a critic of United States involvement in the Vietnam War. After completing his dissertation, which is still considered a classic on Indonesian history, Kahin became a faculty member at Cornell University. At Cornell, he became the director of its Southeast Asia Program and founded the Cornell Modern Indonesia Project. Kahin's incomplete memoir was published posthumously in 2003.

== Early life and education ==
George McTurnan Kahin was born on January 25, 1918, in Baltimore, Maryland, and grew up in Seattle, Washington. He received a B.S. in history from Harvard University in 1940.

During World War II, Kahin served in the United States Army between 1942 and 1945, where "he was trained as one of a group of 60 GIs who were to be parachuted into Japanese-occupied Indonesia in advance of Allied forces". However, the operation was canceled after it was determined that U.S. forces would bypass the Indies after the Potsdam Conference. As a result, his unit was sent to the European theater. He earned the rank of sergeant before leaving the Army. Kahin's interest in Southeast Asia developed during this period, and he learned to speak Indonesian and Dutch.

Kahin returned after the war to complete his M.A. from Stanford University, which he received in 1946. His thesis was titled The Political Position of the Chinese in Indonesia (Kahin 1946), describing the role of Chinese Indonesians in the new country. He continued to pursue of his interest in Southeast Asia, going to Indonesia in 1948 to conduct research during the Indonesian National Revolution. During his work, he was arrested by Dutch colonial authorities and expelled from the country. Kahin received a Ph.D. in political science from Johns Hopkins University in 1951. His dissertation, titled Nationalism and Revolution in Indonesia (Kahin 1952), is considered a classic on Indonesian history.

== Academic career ==
In 1951, Kahin became an assistant professor of government at Cornell University. He received tenure and was promoted to associate professor in 1954; he became a full professor in 1959. He became the director of Cornell's Southeast Asia Program in 1961 and held the position until 1970. Kahin also founded the Cornell Modern Indonesia Project in 1954 and served as its director until his retirement in 1988. Between 1962 and 1963, he became a Fulbright professor at London University. Kahin was a member of the Council on Foreign Relations and the American Academy of Arts and Sciences.

We voted for the maintenance of academic freedom, believing that without that essential quality there can be no relationship of any kind between blacks and a university, because without that quality you don't have a university.

— George McTurnan Kahin, April 25, 1969,

On April 19, 1969, Cornell's Afro-American Society occupied the Willard Straight Hall student union in protest against "the university's racist attitudes and irrelevant curriculum" regarding racial issues. The university was divided between proponents of the inclusion of the principles of social justice in course instruction and advocates of academic freedom for the faculty. This clash affected the Department of Government, where Kahin and a number of professors defending academic freedom resided. Many of these professors had considered leaving the university due to the administration's policies promoting racial justice, and many did following the end of the occupation. The following week, the Department of Government organized a teach-in on academic freedom, and Kahin was invited to speak at the event by department chair Peter Sharfman. Historian Walter LaFeber would later remember his remarks as "the most eloquent speech about academic freedom I have ever encountered anywhere up to that time or since that time".

=== Vietnam War critic ===
Kahin was a leading critic of the Vietnam War and opposed United States involvement. He participated in a teach-in in May 1965 and led the anti-war position. Later, he co-wrote The United States in Vietnam (Kahin & Lewis 1969) with Stanford professor John Lewis, a publication which helped to turn people in academia against U.S. intervention in Vietnam. It was one of the most comprehensive studies of American involvement in the war to date. According to Kahin and Lewis, American policy was based on a distorted view of Vietnam. "Vietnam is a single nation, not two," Kahin and Lewis argued, and "South Vietnam constitutes an artificial creation whose existence depends on the sustained application of American power."

When U.S. Senator George McGovern campaigned in the 1972 presidential election on a platform to end the war, Kahin became his foreign policy adviser.

=== Cambodia ===
In early 1975, Kahin gave testimony to the US Senate Subcommittee on Foreign Assistance and Economic Policy. In his opening, he said:

Mr Chairman, my own research makes very clear that responsibility for the outbreak of the tragic civil war in Cambodia lies with the very architects of foreign policy in the executive branch who now argue that the international prestige and credibility of the United States are inextricably tied to its insuring the survival of the present government in Phnom Penh through international or nongovernmental channels.

In Cambodia, US officials assert that US credibility and national honor are at stake. If this is so it is imperative to distinguish between credibility for relief of human suffering as against credibility for a dogmatic perpetuation of past error. Let us also not fail to distinguish between the credibility and honor of the principal architects of our cambodian policy – the CIA, the Pentagon, and Henry Kissinger – and that of the United States as nation.

In his foreword to Gareth Porter's book Cambodia: Starvation and Revolution, Kahin argued that Khmer Rouge policies "were not, then, applications of some irrational ideology, but reflected pragmatic solutions by leaders who had to rely exclusively on Cambodia's own food resources and who lacked facilities for its internal transport."

=== Relations with Indonesia ===
After Kahin was expelled from Indonesia in 1949, he helped young Indonesian diplomats Sumitro Djojohadikusumo, Soedarpo Sastrosatomo, and Soedjatmoko during their work at the United Nations and in Washington, D.C. He also developed a close relationship with Sukarno and Mohammad Hatta, the first President and Vice President of Indonesia. In his book Subversion as Foreign Policy (Kahin & Kahin 1995), he attempted to clear former Prime Minister Mohammad Natsir, with whom he also developed a personal relationship, of any involvement with a rebellion movement against the Indonesian government. The book also described a "destructive relationship" between the United States and Indonesia during Sukarno's presidency.

Kahin helped develop Indonesian studies in the United States at a time when the majority of material on Indonesia was held at Leiden University in the Netherlands. At Cornell, he introduced a postgraduate education program for diplomats from around the world who were in the middle of their careers. He also helped many Indonesian intellectuals, including Deliar Noer and sociologist Selo Soemardjan, obtain education in the United States. Several of Kahin's students and associates, including Herbert Feith, went on to establish similar programs at the universities where they subsequently taught.

At one point, the United States blocked Kahin's passport, and the Suharto government in Indonesia also denied him a visa. In 1991, Indonesian foreign minister Ali Alatas awarded Kahin the Bintang Jasa Pratama (English: Medal of Merit, First Class) for his work as a "pioneer and precursor of Indonesian studies in the U.S."

== Personal life ==
Kahin married Margaret Baker in 1942. They later divorced .

== Death and legacy ==
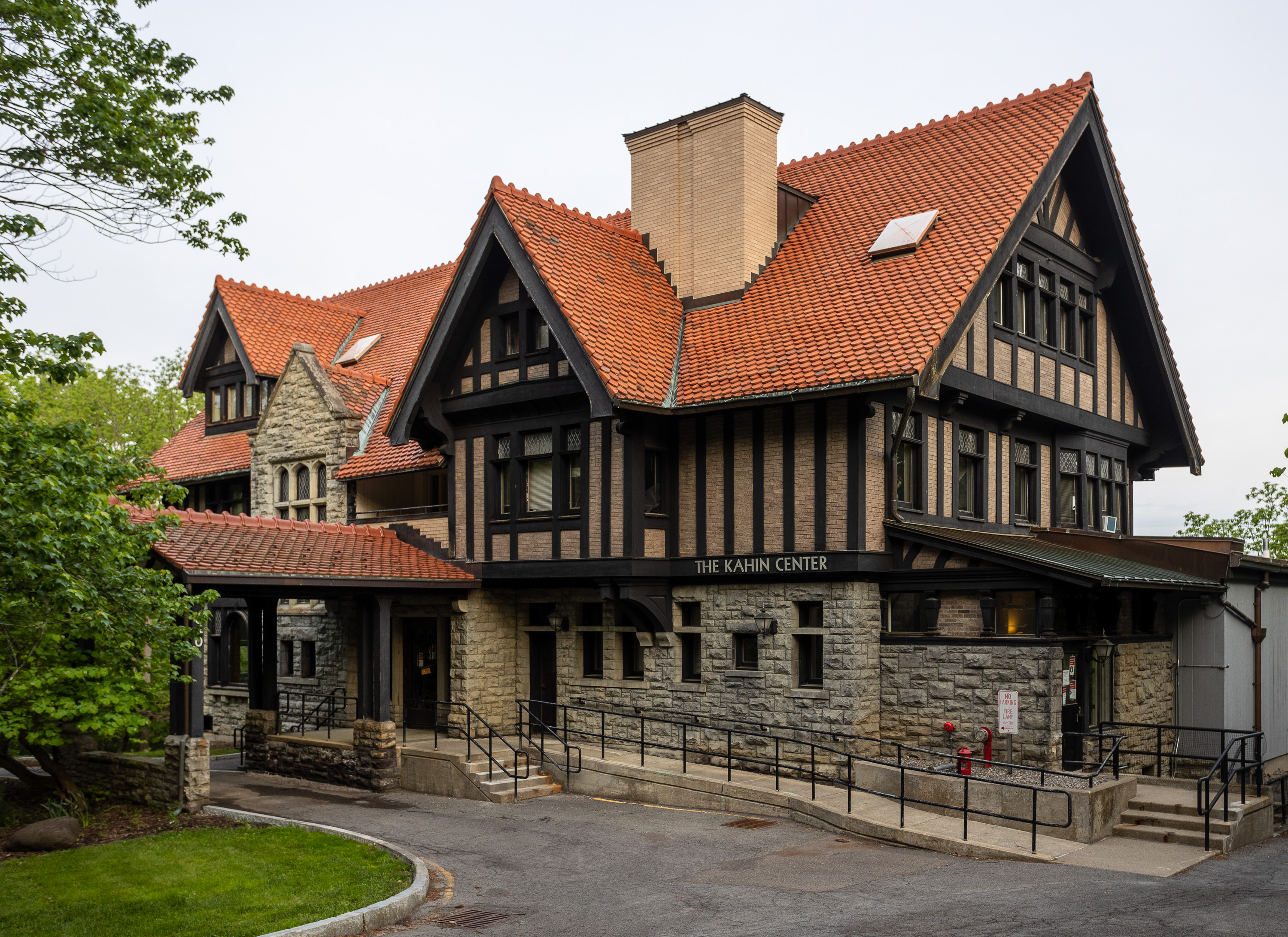
The George McT. Kahin Center for Advanced Research on Southeast Asia at Cornell University

Kahin died at Strong Memorial Hospital in Rochester, New York, on January 29, 2000. Several months after his death, a memorial service was held in Ithaca, New York, for him and to commemorate the 25th anniversary of the end of the Vietnam War. A memoir which he never completed was brought to publication by his wife Audrey Richey Kahin (Kahin 2003). Kahin is also survived by his son Brian, daughter Sharon, sister Peggy Kahin Webb, and two grandchildren.

Kahin was a major influence on the foreign policy thinking of Sandy Berger, United States National Security Advisor under President Bill Clinton. He is the namesake of Cornell University's George McT. Kahin Center for Advanced Research on Southeast Asia, dedicated in his honor in 1992.

== Major publications ==
- Kahin, George McT. (2003). Southeast Asia: A testament. Critical Asian Scholarship. London: RoutledgeCurzon. ISBN 978-0-415-29976-3.

=== Southeast Asia and Indonesia ===
- Kahin, George McTurnan (1946). The Political Position of the Chinese in Indonesia. OCLC 12578741.
- Kahin, George McTurnan (1952) [1951]. Nationalism and Revolution in Indonesia. Ithaca, NY: Cornell University Press. OCLC 406170.
- Hinton, Harold C.; Ike, Nobutaka; Palmer, Norman D.; Callard, Keith; Wheeler, Richard S. (1963) [1958]. Kahin, George McT. (ed.). Major Governments of Asia (2nd ed.). Ithaca, NY: Cornell University Press. OCLC 326028.
- Wilson, David A.; Silverstein, Josef; Feith, Herbert; Parmer, J. Norman; Klein, Wells C.; Weiner, Marjorie; Wurfel, David (1964) [1959]. Kahin, George McTurnan (ed.). Governments and Politics of Southeast Asia (2nd ed.). Ithaca, NY: Cornell University Press. OCLC 501777.
- Kahin, George McT.; Kahin, Audrey R. (1995). Subversion as Foreign Policy: The Secret Eisenhower and Dulles Debacle in Indonesia. New York: The New Press. ISBN 978-1-56584-244-1.

=== Vietnam War ===
- Kahin, George McTurnan; Lewis, John Wilson (1969) [1967]. The United States in Vietnam (2nd ed.). New York: Dial Press. OCLC 45035.
- Kahin, George McT. (1986). Intervention: How America Became Involved in Vietnam (1st ed.). New York: Knopf. ISBN 978-0-394-54367-3.
