= Gombong =

- Town
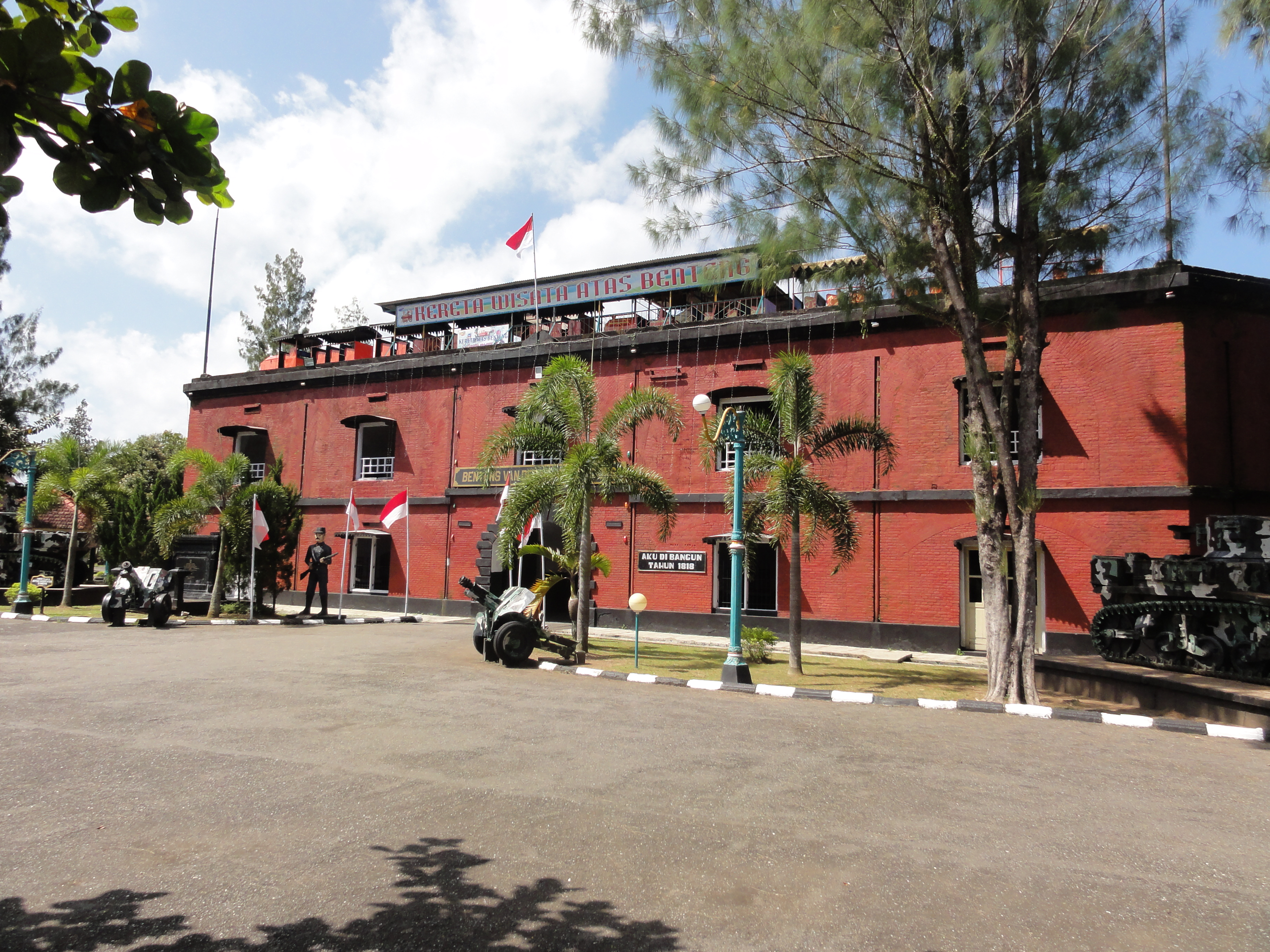
- Entrance of Fort van der Wijck

- Location within Kebumen Regency Location within Java Location within Indonesia
- Coordinates: 7°36′S 109°31′E
- Country: Indonesia
- Province: Central Java
- Regency: Kebumen Regency

Area
  - Total: 19.48 km^{2} (7.52 sq mi)

Population (mid 2024 estimate)
  - Total: 50,950
  - Density: 2,616/km^{2} (6,774/sq mi)
- Time zone: UTC+7 (IWST)
- Area code: (+62) 287
- Villages: 14
- Website: kec-gombong.kebumenkab.go.id

Gombong is a town in Kebumen Regency, in the southern part of Central Java, a province in Indonesia. The town has 50,300 inhabitants at the 2020 Census, while the estimate as at mid 2024 was 50,950. The total land area is 19.48 km^{2} (7.52 sq mi). Local people speak Banyumasan, a dialect of Javanese.

In 1964, construction of the Catholic Church of St. Michael Parish was completed. In 1996, the Wonokriyo market was built, becoming the biggest one in the region. A few dinosaur statues are located around the town: at the entrance of Fort Van der Wijck, at Tirta Manggala Swimming Pools and at Sempor Reservoir. Not far from the town, the prayer house Geraja Ayam, also known as the chicken church, is built.

Fort Van der Wijck, which was built in the early 19th century by General Johannes Van den Bosch, is located in the northern part of the town. The military compound served to train soldiers for later service in the Royal Netherlands East Indies Army. Suharto, the second President of Indonesia, began his service here on 1 June 1940 prior to the Japanese occupation). The fort was used by the Indonesian Armed Forces until 2000. Since then the compound has been developed as a recreational site.

== Administrative villages ==
Gombong consists of 14 villages (comprising two urban kelurahan - Gombong and Wonokriyo - and twelve rural desa):

1. Banjarsari
2. Gombong
3. Kalitengah
4. Kedungpuji
5. Kemukus
6. Klopogodo
7. Panjangsari
8. Patemon
9. Semanding
10. Semondo
11. Sidayu
12. Wero
13. Wonokriyo
14. Wonosigro

== Notable people ==
- Maus Gatsonides (1911–1998), Dutch rally driver and inventor of the speed camera.
- Kasino Hadiwibowo (1950–1997), Indonesian comedian and member of Warkop group.
- Willem Nijholt (1934–2023), Dutch actor.
