= Nawi Ismail =

Indonesian film director and actor (1918–1990)

- Born: 18 April 1918; Batavia, Dutch East Indies
- Died: 8 February 1990 (aged 71); Jakarta, Indonesia
- Occupation(s): Actor, director
- Years active: 1951–1990

Nawi Ismail (18 April 1918 – 8 February 1990) was an Indonesian film director and actor. He often worked with Dicky Zulkarnaen and Benyamin Sueb.

== Biography ==
Born in Batavia (now Jakarta), Dutch East Indies, on 18 April 1918, Ismail received an elementary and junior high school education. After graduating in 1937, he worked for some time at the Batavia-based publisher Kolff.

However, Ismail soon became involved in the burgeoning film industry, being cast in a supporting role in Melati van Agam (1940). Behind the screen, he served as assistant cinematographer for Ikan Doejoeng (1941) and Selendang Delima (1941). He remained involved in film production throughout the Japanese occupation (1942–1945), scripting and editing newsreels.

After the end of the occupation, as the nascent Indonesian republic—proclaimed on 17 August 1945—fought to retain its independence, Ismail entered the Indonesian military, ultimately reaching the rank of second lieutenant. After the Indonesian National Revolution concluded in 1949, he returned to cinema, serving as editor on such films as Untuk Sang Merah Putih and Sedap Malam (both 1950). He also became increasingly interested in film direction, serving as assistant director on PFN's Inspektur Rachman (1951) before making his directorial debut with Akibat (1951).

Although Ismail was productive throughout the 1950s, he only rose to prominence with Dewi Film's Berabe (1960); another film with this studio, Si Pitung (1970), similarly gained popular acclaim. Although Ismail worked on numerous films throughout the 1970s and 1980s, he became best known for his comedies. These included a series of films starring Benyamin Sueb, as well as the first three Warkop comedies.

In 1989, Ismail received a lifetime achievement award for his contributions to Indonesian cinema. He died on 8 February 1990.

== Analysis ==
As a director, Ismail touched upon a number of noteworthy and controversial topics; his Warok Singo Kobra (1982), for instance, features "obviously transgender gemblak". Mereka Kembali (1972) uses images of violence and the military to depict "hagiographies about the role of the military in the 1945 to 1949 struggle for independence", and portrays the military as a national organization showing "religious tolerance and unity in diversity" in contrast to an Islamist militia.

Ismail edited the majority of the films he directed.

== Filmography ==
- Akibat (1951)
- Solo Diwaktu Malam (1952)
- Neng Yatimah (1953)
- Tunggal (1953)
- Tjuriga (1954)
- Bunga Bangsa (1955)
- Pilihlah Aku (1956)
- Salah Pilih (1956)
- Tjatut (1956)
- Serodja (1958)
- Gembira Ria (1959)
- Berabe (1960)
- Karena Daster (1961)
- Marina (1961)
- Panon Hideung (1961)
- Manusia dan Pristiwa (1968)
- Kutukan (1970)
- Si Pitung (1970)
- Banteng Betawi (1971)
- Benyamin Biang Kerok (1972)
- Mereka Kembali (1972)
- Biang Kerok Beruntung (1973)
- Benyamin Brengsek (1973)
- Bajingan Tengik (1974)
- Ratu Amplop (1974)
- Pilih Menantu (1974)
- Samson Betawi (1975)
- Benyamin Koboi Cengeng (1975)
- Benyamin Tukang Ngibul (1975)
- Tiga Djanggo (1976)
- Diana (1977)
- Pembalasan Si Pitung (1977)
- Istri Dulu Istri sekarang (1978)
- Zaman Edan (1978)
- Mana Tahaaan... (1979)
- Si Ayub Dari Teluk Naga (1979)
- Ge..Er (1980)
- Gengsi Dong (1980)
- Orang-Orang Sinting (1981)
- Enak Benar Jadi Jutawan (1982)
- Warok Singo Kobra (1982)
- Sama Gilanya (1983)
- Asal Tahu Saja (1984)
- Demam Tari (1985)
- Memble Tapi Kece (1986)
