= Indro (comedian) =

Indonesian actor and comedian (born 1958)

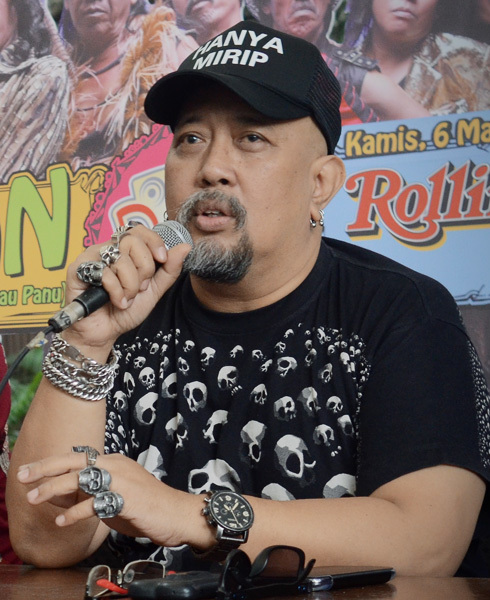
- Indro in 2014
- Born: Indrodjojo Kusumonegoro; 8 May 1958 (age 68); Jakarta, Indonesia
- Education: Pancasila University
- Occupations: Actor; comedian; singer
- Years active: 1978–present
- Known for: Member of Warkop DKI

Indrodjojo Kusumonegoro (born 8 May 1958), better known by the mononym Indro, and also called as Indro Warkop, is an Indonesian actor and comedian. Indro is the only surviving member of the comedy group Warkop.

== Career ==
=== Early career and success with Warkop ===
Indro's introduction to the Warkop group began in 1976 when he was still in high school. To increase his income, he applied to become a radio announcer in Prambors. At that time, other Warkop colleagues, such as Dono, Kasino, Nanu Moeljono, and Rudy Badil, wanted to make a broadcast program titled casual chat with a humorous topic. Indro, who was the youngest at that time, was invited to join. Since the show was broadcast, Indro and his four friends have finally started to commit to being comedians with the name Warkop Prambors. Indro's debut as a comedian at Warkop Prambors began when he was a farewell performer at SMA Negeri 9 Jakarta. At that time, he was asked by Rudy Badil to replace his position, who often had stage fright. Indro is the only Warkop personnel who is not a student at the University of Indonesia because he is studying at the Pancasila University.

Together with Dono, Kasino and Nanu, Indro then developed the Warkop Prambors group by starring in their first film entitled Mana Tahaaan... which was released in 1979. Nanu then resigned from Warkop not long after the film was released. Since then until 1994, Warkop Prambors, which has now changed its name to Warkop DKI, has starred in a total of 34 comedy films and one docudrama.

=== Indro as "Indro" in the Warkop's movie ===
In Mana Tahaaan..., Indro portrays Paijo, a Javanese from Purbalingga, a role he has embodied since his days at Prambors radio. In Gengsi Dong, Paijo is depicted as the son of a wealthy businessman in the oil sector. Subsequently, in GeEr - Gede Rasa, it is revealed that Paijo has graduated from college and is now a doctor at a hospital.

When Parkit Film took over the production of Warkop, Indro ceased to portray Paijo and instead played the character "Indro". In an interview, Indro described his characters in Warkop films, whether produced by Parkit Film or Soraya Intercine Films, as ignorant, know-it-all, and irresponsible. This characterization is underscored by his trademark phrase in the films: "emang gue pikirin?" Additionally, as "Indro", he has portrayed various characters with distinct regional accents. In Sama Juga Bohong and Depan Bisa Belakang Bisa, Indro assumes the role of a Betawi from Cikampek, West Java. In Saya Suka Kamu Punya, he embodies a Batak character.

=== Later career ===
After Pencet Sana Pencet Sini which was released in 1994, Indro together with Dono and Kasino agreed to no longer play in films because at the same time the film business in Indonesia was also sluggish due to the large number of adult-themed films and the invasion of imported films from Hollywood, Bollywood, and Hong Kong. Production was then continued through a television series entitled Warkop DKI which is still being produced by Soraya Intercine Films. After Kasino died in 1997 and followed by Dono in 2001, Indro continued to use the group name Warkop even though he was alone. The last television series that used the Warkop title that he starred in was Warkop: Cewek OK, Cowok OK, which was released in 2004.

After a long hiatus, Indro returned to the big screen in 2011 through the film Semesta Mendukung. In this film he plays the character of Cak Kumis who comes from East Java. Indro later became the executive producer for the Warkop DKI Reborn series, which consisted of four films. The character "Indro" himself is played by Tora Sudiro (film 1–2) and Randy Danistha (film 3–4).

== Personal life ==
Indro is the son of Moehammad Oemargatab and Soeselia Kartanegara. His father was a police officer while his mother was a catering businesswomen. When he was a child, Indro wanted to follow in his father's footsteps to become an officer, but his parents did not agree. Indro's father died in 1968. After his father's death, Indro helped his mother run a catering business by becoming a shopper.

Indro married Nita Octobijanthy in 1981. The couple has three children, Handika Indrajanthy Putrie, Satya Paramita Hada Dwinita, and Harleyano Triandro. Indro's second child, Hada Dwinita, was a member of the 2001 National Paskibraka team representing DKI Jakarta.

On 9 October 2018, Indro's wife died from lung cancer. Her body was buried in the Tanah Kusir Public Cemetery, South Jakarta.
