= CHIPS (Indonesian film) =

- Directed by: Iksan Lahardi
- Written by: Warkop and Deddy Armand
- Based on: CHiPs
- Produced by: Haryadi Siswanto
- Starring: Warung Kopi Prambors (Dono, Kasino, Indro); Sherly Malinton; M. Panji Anom
- Distributed by: Nugraha Mas Film
- Release date: 15 April 1983 (Indonesia)
- Country: Indonesia
- Language: Indonesian

CHIPS: Cara Hebat Ikut Penanggulangan Masalah Sosial is an Indonesian comedy film that premiered on April 15, 1983. Directed by Iksan Lahardi, it stars Dono, Kasino, and Indro. This film is inspired by the success of a similarly famous TV series from the 1980s, CHiPs, starring Erik Estrada as Officer Francis Ponchorello.

== Cast ==
- Wahjoe Sardono as Dono
- Kasino Hadiwibowo as Kasino
- Indrodjojo Kusumonegoro as Indro
- Sherly Malinton as Lita
- M. Panji Anom as Junet
- Tetty Liz Indriati as Wece (Lita's friend)
- Chintami Atmanegara as A girl who was about to commit suicide, who Indro helped
- Bokir as Tire repairman
- Memed Mini as Tomi
- Giselawati Wiranegara as Tomi's aunt
- Darto Helm as A man who pretended to be dead, who Kasino & Wece helped
- Usbanda as Arguing husband
- Alicia Johar as Quarrelsome wife
- Bung Salim as The crazy person who is chasing Dono
- Aminah Cendrakasih as The mother who was pickpocketed
- Eddy Bakar Pare as CHIPS Office canteen keeper
- Hadisjam Tahax as Gas station attendant
- Waty Siregar as Junet's girlfriend

== Plot ==
Dono, Kasino, and Indro are employed as private community service officers, dedicated to maintaining security and public order. Alongside the Warkop DKI trio, the film stars the late Panji Anom as Junet, their boss at CHIPS, and Sherly Malinton as Lita, Dono's romantic interest. From the outset, the film presents a series of comedic incidents: Kasino chasing after a reckless trail motorcyclist, Indro managing the antics of a mischievous child named Tomi, and Dono ending up soaked after accidentally falling into a river with Lita during a romantic interlude.

A memorable line from the film is "Jangkrik Boss," uttered by Kasino upon catching his boss in a compromising situation with a woman in the forest. The film concludes somewhat tragically as Dono is compelled to abandon his plans to propose to Lita, who must honor her arranged marriage with Junet, their boss. Nonetheless, Dono exacts a humorous revenge by tossing Junet's cigar in a fit of rage, which elicits laughter from the trio as they play a prank on their former boss. Ultimately, the film ends on a comedic note.

== Release ==
The film was produced in 1982 and officially released to the public on 15th April 1983.

== Legacy ==
During the controversy between Warkop DKI and Warkopi in 2021, comedian Sammy Notaslimboy claimed that the film CHIPS was clearly plagiarized from the CHIPs TV series.

The CHIPS organization was reintroduced in the first and second installments of the Warkop DKI Reborn film series. These films were released in 2016 and 2017, respectively.
