= El Bahar =

Defunct Indonesian newspaper

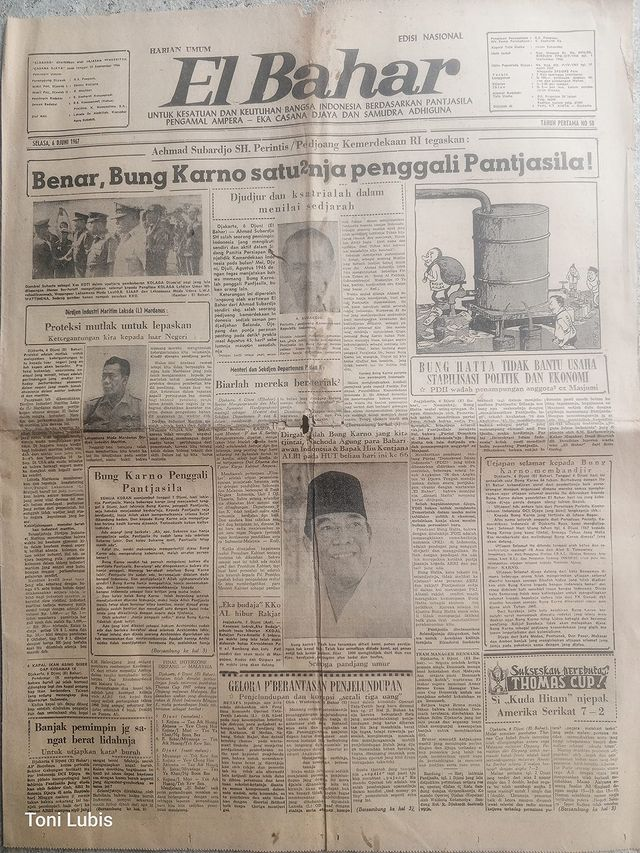
- El Bahar, 8 June 1967
- Format: Broadsheet
- Founded: September 1966
- Ceased publication: 1972
- Language: Indonesian
- Country: Indonesia

El Bahar was an Indonesian language newspaper based in Jakarta which was published between 1966 and 1972. The newspaper began publication in September 1966, under the leadership of Indonesian Navy commodore Soejoso Poegoeh (nephew of deposed president Sukarno). The newspaper's staff contained a number of naval officers, alongside former staff of the banned newspaper Suluh Indonesia. El Bahar was unique at the time for taking a pro-Sukarno stance, and despite its political position maintained a mostly continuous publication early on with one suspension in early 1967.

El Bahar was described by contemporary newspapers as "lacking news", and instead containing a large number of pro-Sukarno commentary. The front page of the newspaper was often reserved for articles or commentary on national politics, which included caricature drawings satirizing Indonesian politics. A notable contributor was Dono, later known as a comedian, in the early 1970s.

Despite the censorship of a large number of media outlets during the Suharto era, especially those which criticized the Suharto government, El Bahar had the backing of influential navy and marine corps officers. The paper softened its stance following Poegoeh's 1969 assignment as military attache in India, with members of its editorial board being replaced. Throughout its life, the newspaper was published irregularly, switching from daily, weekly, and biweekly publications.
