= Akibat =

1951 film by Nawi Ismail

Akibat is a 1951 Indonesian film directed by Nawi Ismail. It stars Awaludin, A. Hadi, and Sukarsih.
