= Alwi Shahab =

Indonesian journalist (1936–2020)

- علوي شهاب
- Born: Alwi Shahab; August 31, 1936; Kwitang, Batavia, Dutch East Indies
- Died: September 17, 2020 (aged 84); Jakarta, Indonesia
- Other names: Abah Alwi
- Occupations: Journalist; author; humanist; historian
- Parents: Saleh Shahab (father); Salmah Alhabshi (mother)
- Relatives: Ali Shahab (brother)
- Website: alwishahab.wordpress.com

Alwi Shahab (Arabic: علوي شهاب, romanized: ʻAlwī Šihāb; August 31, 1936 – September 17, 2020) was an Indonesian journalist for more than 40 years who mainly focused on Jakarta's socio-cultural problems. His career began in 1960 as a journalist at the Arabian Press Board news agency in Jakarta.

In addition to journalism, Alwi also wrote essays which were compiled at least into 11 books from 2001 to 2013. Most of his books were published by Republika, where he worked since 1993. Subjects of his articles include the history of culture in Jakarta.

== Early life and family ==
Alwi was born in Kwitang and was the oldest son of Saleh and Salma of Yemeni descent. His siblings were Latifah, Ali Shahab, Ahmad and Nur. He was also a maternal great grandson of Habib Ali bin Abdurrahman al-Habsyi of Kwitang from his granddaughter Salma, the daughter of Maria Van Engels.

Alwi Shahab had six children from his marriage to Sjarifah Maryam Binti Abdullah Shahab: Yusuf Reza Shahab, Luli Mas'ad Shahab, Vera Farida Shahab, Viga Rogaya Shahab, Abdullah Shahab, and Fetty Fatimah Shahab.

== Career ==
His career began in 1960 as a journalist at the Arabian Press Board news agency in Jakarta. Then in August 1963, he worked in the Antara News Agency. He has done various types of coverage when in Antara, ranging from city reporters, parliamentary police, to the economic field. In addition, for nine years (1969–1978), he had also been a Palace reporter. Alwi retired in Antara in 1993, and later joined Republika.

During his time as a journalist, Alwi Shahab often did coverage abroad. Like in 1983, he visited the Malaysia–Thailand border covering the operation to crush the Communist movement by the Malaysian Army.

== Health ==
Alwi Shahab was diabetic since the age of 40. He died on 17 September 2020 at his home after a short period of pneumonia.

== Publications ==
- Robin Hood Betawi (2001) [Robin Hood of Betawi], published by Republika
- Betawi: Queen of the East (2002), published by Republika
- Saudagar Baghdad dari Betawi (2004) [Merchant of Baghdad from Betawi], published by Republika
- Maria van Engel: Menantu Habib Kwitang (2006) [Maria van Engel: Son-in-law of Habib Kwitang], published by Republika
- Oey Tambahsia Playboy Betawi (2007) [Oey Tambahsia, the Playboy of Betawi], published by Lentera
- Ciliwung: Venesia dari Timur (2007) [Ciliwung: Venesia from East], published by Lentera
- Hukum Pancung di Batavia (2007) [Pancung Law in Batavia], published by Lentera
- Kasino Bernama Kepulauan Seribu (2007) [Casino Named Thousand Islands], published by Lentera
- Batavia Kota Banjir (2009) [Batavia, the City of Floods], published by Republika
- Batavia Kota Hantu (2010) [Batavia, the City of Ghost], published by Republika
- Waktu Belanda Mabuk Lahirlah Batavia (2013) [When the Dutch were Drunk, Batavia was Born], published by Republika

== Awards ==
- Anugerah Budaya 2009, by the Government of Jakarta Capital Special Region through the Governor of Jakarta (December 17, 2009)
- Press Card Number One, by central committee of National Press Day (February 9, 2011)
- The Most Inspiring Print Media Rubric, by Dompet Dhuafa (July 10, 2012)
