= Rudy Badil =

Indonesian journalist (1945–2019)

- Born: Rudy David Badil; 29 November 1945; Jakarta, Indonesia
- Died: 11 July 2019 (aged 73); Depok, West Java, Indonesia
- Burial place: Tanah Kusir Public Cemetery, South Jakarta
- Education: University of Indonesia
- Occupations: Journalist; comedian; writer
- Employer: Kompas
- Known for: Member of Warkop

Rudy David Badil (29 November 1945 – 11 July 2019) was an Indonesian journalist who co-founded the comedy group Warkop with Nanu Moeljono, Kasino Hadiwibowo (Kasino), Wahjoe Sardono (Dono), and Indrodjojo Kusumonegoro (Indro). Before being known as Warkop DKI (acronym from Dono-Kasino-Indro), this group was called Warkop Prambors, which broadcast humorous entertainment programs through Radio Prambors.

While studying at the University of Indonesia, Badil was one of the students taught by Dono. He is also known to be a friend of Soe Hok Gie, with whom they had climbed the mountain together.

After leaving the Warkop group due to stage fright, Badil worked as a journalist at Kompas since 6 August 1980. He then retired on 29 November 2005.

Badil died after undergoing treatment for a stroke at the Hermina Hospital in Depok on 11 July 2019. His body was buried in the Tanah Kusir Public Cemetery, South Jakarta.
