= Ali Shahab =

Indonesian journalist and director (1941–2018)

- علي شهاب
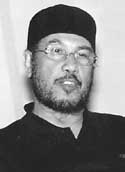
- Born: Ali Shahab; September 22, 1941; Kwitang, Batavia, Dutch East Indies
- Died: December 25, 2018 (aged 77); Jakarta, Indonesia
- Education: ASRI Arts Academy (1958–1963)
- Occupations: Film director; screenwriter; journalist; novelist
- Relatives: Alwi Shahab (elder brother)

Ali Shahab (Arabic: علي شهاب, romanized: ʻAlī Šahāb; September 22, 1941 – December 25, 2018) was an Indonesian film director, screenwriter, journalist, and novelist. Before entering the world of film, Ali was active as a journalist in a number of mass media, one of whom had become the editor in chief of Indonesia Jaya. He has also been a caricature maker, active in the theater, and a novelist. There are at least 20 works of books, including several novels, which have been published from 1969 to 2006. In addition, in the world of cinema, Ali has recorded at least 14 film titles and more than 8 television series and soap operas as directors. As a screenwriter, he is involved in at least 17 films.

In addition, Ali was a member of the National Film Council (1989–1994), founder and general chairperson of the Indonesian Production House Association (1991), chairman of the judging division of the Indonesian Soap Opera Festival (1994–1998), and member of the National Film Consideration Agency (1995–1998).

== Career ==
His career in the film world began when he was involved as an artistic stylist in the film Di Balik Tjahaja Gemerlapan directed by Misbach Yusa Biran in 1966. After that, his works in the cinemas world was not heard anymore. He only returned to the world of film in the early 1970s when he became acquainted with Suzzanna and Dicky Suprapto, the owner of Tidar Jaya Film.

Ali first worked in the field of film directing through the film Beranak Dalam Kubur together with Awaludin in 1972. In addition, while actively filling out TVRI shows, he successfully directed the television series Rumah Masa Depan in 1984. Thanks to the television series, he was referred to as a pioneer in creating a stripping program in Indonesia.
