= Nobutaka Ike =

Nobutaka Ike (June 6, 1916 – December 15, 2005) was a Stanford University professor of Japanese and East Asian politics. He wrote many books on the Japanese political system.

== Early life and education ==
Nobutaka Ike was born in Seattle as a US citizen to parents who immigrated from Japan. He studied political science at University of Washington and got his BA in 1940. Following the Japanese attack on Pearl Harbor, he was forcibly relocated to Camp Harmony, but was released in summer 1942 due to his willingness to assist the US Navy with translation work. After the war, he resumed his studies and got his Ph.D. from Johns Hopkins University.

== Scholarly career ==
From 1958 until retirement in 1984, Ike worked at Stanford University, on the faculty of the Department of Political Science. He served as department chair during the mid-1960s.

== Later life ==
In the late 1990s or early 2000s, Ike and his wife moved to Jacksonville, Florida, where he died in 2005.

== Works ==
- The Beginnings of Political Democracy in Japan (1950)
- Japanese Politics: An Introductory Survey (1957)
- Japan's Decision for War: Records of the 1941 Policy Conferences (ed.) (Stanford University Press, 1967)
- Japanese Politics: Patron-Client Democracy (1972)
- Japan, the New Superstate (1973)
- A Theory of Japanese Democracy (1978)
