= Selo Soemardjan =

Indonesian senior academic (1915–2003)

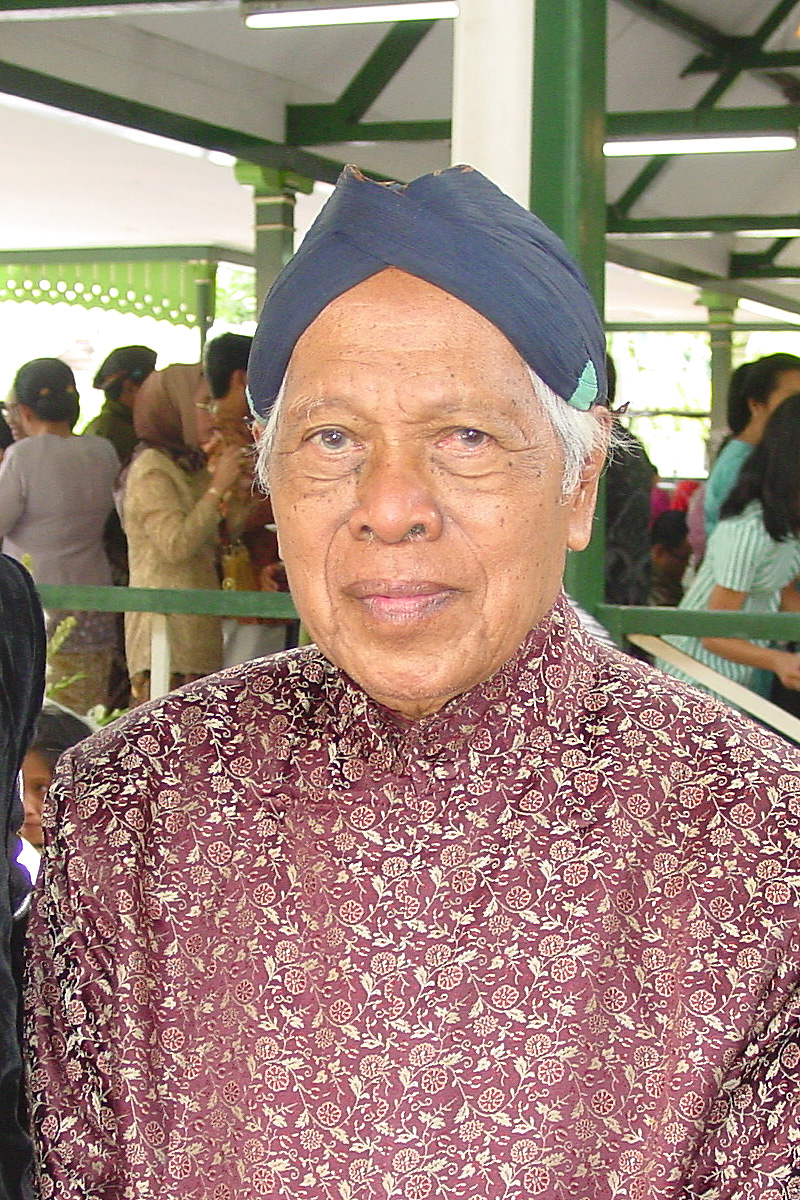
- Selo Soemardjan in 2002
- Born: Soemardjan; May 23, 1915; Yogyakarta
- Died: June 11, 2003 (aged 88); Jakarta, Indonesia
- Burial place: Kuncen Cemetery, Yogyakarta

Academic background
- Education: Cornell University
- Thesis: Social Changes in Jogjakarta (1959)

Academic work
- Discipline: Sociology
- Institutions: University of Indonesia

Selo Soemardjan (May 23, 1915 in Yogyakarta – June 11, 2003 in Jakarta), also spelled as Selo Sumarjan or Selo Sumardjan, was a well known senior academic in sociology at the University of Indonesia, and is known as the Pioneer of Indonesian Social Sciences. He was awarded with the title Kanjeng Pangeran Haryo, a knighthood from the Yogyakarta Sultanate.

Selo Soemardjan obtained his PhD at Cornell University. After his return from the United States in 1959, he held a range of academic posts, although the majority of his time was spent at UI and the Social Sciences Foundation (Yayasan Ilmu-ilmu Sosial — YIIS) which he co-founded and headed for three decades.

== Background and education ==
He began his career as a government bureaucrat in Java, serving as a district head in a rural area outside Yogyakarta. The term Selo was actually not his name, but a title attributed to Soemardjan's occupation as scribe/secretary to the Yogyakarta government, when he worked as regent of Kulonprogo. However, the term became so embedded with his real name Soemardjan, hence Selo Soemardjan became his proper name.

During the revolutionary period 1945–1950, he was secretary to Sultan Hamengkubuwono IX, a major figure in the struggle for independence. In 1948, an American student named George McTurnan Kahin was doing research in Yogyakarta. Kahin asked Minister of Education Ali Sastroamidjojo to suggest a suitable candidate as a research assistant. Sastroamidjojo suggested Selo Soemardjan, who was a civil servant, secretary to Sultan Hamengkubuwono IX.

The situation became even more unstable. Social change that took place during Indonesia's struggle for independence compelled Soemardjan to study sociology. Kahin helped him to get the documents needed to study at Cornell, with sponsorship from the Ford Foundation, and, in February 1956, he went to Cornell, where he studied all the European theories of sociology. In 1959, Soemardjan returned to Yogyakarta to undertake research on social change for his PhD, and after six months, he went back to Cornell to complete his thesis and sit for exams. He completed his thesis titled Social Changes in Jogjakarta in 1959.

Below are several educational establishments he was involved with:

- HIS, Yogyakarta (1921–1928)
- MULO, Yogyakarta (1928–1931)
- MOSVIA, Magelang (1931–1934)
- Cornell University, Ithaca, New York, AS (PhD 1959)

== Career and Works ==
Upon his graduation from Cornell, Mohammad Sadli of Faculty of Economics in the University of Indonesia asked him to teach sociology in his department. As the only teacher in the department without a background in economics, he taught a subject that was titled "Non-economic Factors in Economic Development."

Later on, Soemardjan established the Faculty of Social Sciences in the University of Indonesia and held the post of Dean for ten years. He was appointed as professor and later on as professor emeritus.

In 1968, after General Suharto officially replaced Sukarno as president, Sadli and his colleagues (often known as the Berkeley Mafia) became the architects of Indonesia's economic policy. Selo Soemardjan was involved in the analysis of non-economic factors.

As a professor, Soemardjan was able to explain sociology theories by using a layman's term, citing everyday examples that are encountered particularly from his past experience as a civil servant.

- Regent of Kulonprogo Regency and Staff of Yogyakarta Sultanate / Yogyakarta Provincial Government (1935–1949)
- Civilian Chief of Staff for Jakarta Raya (1949–1950)
- Head of Defence Staff Secretariat in Prime Minister's Cabinet (1950–1956)
- Secretary for State Supervisory Agency (1959–1961)
- Head of Department of State
- Secretary for the State Auditing Board
- Secretary for Minister of State of Economics, Finance, and Industry (1966–1973)
- Secretary for Indonesian Vice President Sultan Hamengkubuwono IX (1973–1978)
- Assistant for Indonesian Vice President in Social Welfare (1978–1983)
- Advisor for Indonesian President (1983–2003)
- Lecturer in Faculty of Law Universitas Indonesia
- Founder of Faculty of Social Sciences in Universitas Indonesia
- Professor in Faculty of Economics Universitas Indonesia
- Professor Emeritus in Universitas Indonesia

== Publications ==
- Social Changes in Yogyakarta. Ithaca, N.Y.: Cornell University Press, 1962.
- Gerakan 10 Mei 1963 di Sukabumi. Bandung: Eresco, 1963.
- Setangkai Bunga Sosiologi (as editor with Soelaeman Soemardi). Jakarta: Lembaga Penerbit Fakultas Ekonomi Universitas Indonesia, 1974
- Indonesia: A Socio-Economic Profile. Stosius Inc/Advent Books Division, 1988.
- Cultural Change in Rural Indonesia: Impact of Village Development (with Kenneth Brazeale). Surakarta: Sebelas Maret University Press, 1993.
- Culture, Development, and Democracy - The Role of the Intellectual: A Tribute to Soedjatmoko (as editor with Kenneth W. Thompson). United Nations University, 1994.
- Kisah Perjuangan Reformasi (as editor). Jakarta: Pustaka Sinar Harapan, 1999.
- Menuju Tata Indonesia Baru (as editor). Jakarta : Gramedia Pustaka Utama, 2000.
- Desentralisasi Pemerintahan

== Award and Honors ==
- Bintang Mahaputra Utama (17 August 1994)
- Gelar ilmuwan utama sosiologi (30 August 1994)
- Anugerah Hamengkubuwono (HB) IX from Universitas Gadjah Mada (UGM) (19 January 2002)

== Personal life ==
Selo Soemardjan was married to R.R. Soeleki Brotoatmodjo, a midwife and a car-racer. They had six children, all of them living in Jakarta, Indonesia. They had fifteen grandchildren, and three great-grandchildren.

He died in 2003 due to a heart attack at the age of 88 years. He is buried in Kuncen Cemetery, Yogyakarta.

After his death, the Selo Soemardjan Research Center was established in 2004.
