= Mereka Kembali =

Mereka Kembali (They Return, 1972) is an Indonesian war film directed by Nawi Ismail. The film portrays the Indonesian equivalent of the Chinese Long March, interpreting the past from the perspective of its own time.

== Sources ==
- Heider, Karl G. (1991). Indonesian Cinema: National Culture on Screen. University of Hawaii Press. ISBN 978-0-8248-1367-3.
