= Ram Soraya =

Indian-Indonesian businessman

- Born: Raam Lalchand Pridhani; November 4, 1949 (age 76); Surabaya
- Other name: Raam Soraya
- Education: Institut Teknologi Sepuluh Nopember
- Occupations: Entrepreneur and film producer
- Children: Sunil Soraya; Rocky Soraya

Raam Lalchand Pridhani, better known as Raam Soraya or Ram Soraya, is an entrepreneur and film producer from Indonesia. He is the owner of production house Soraya Intercine Films. He was born in an Indian-Indonesian (Sindhi) family in Surabaya, Indonesia on 4 November 1949.

Before the film industry, he was a textile importer. His career in film began as a distributor for East Java (1972 to 1982). He became a producer in the Budak Nafsu (1983) which won Best Film at the Indonesian Film Festival (FFI) 1984. The film being the result of his own company, PT. Soraya Intercine Films. After that he made films including Sembilan Wali (1985), Permainan Yang Nakal (1986), Saya Suka Kamu Punya (1987) and others.

Soraya's career peak came after taking over production of the Warkop DKI series from Raam Punjabi's Parkit Film. Soraya made the Warkop television series in 1995 until 2007.

In 2013, Soraya received trophy Piala Jati Emas for his work Tenggelamnya Kapal Van Der Wijck
