= Warkop =

Indonesian comedy trio group formed in 1973

Warkop (an abbreviation of Warung Kopi, meaning "coffee stall"), previously Warkop Prambors (1973 - 1986) and Warkop DKI (1986 - 1997) were an Indonesian comedy group that enjoyed success in radio, film and television from 1970s to 2000s. They soon burgeoned as the country's top comedy group, surpassing Srimulat and Bagito Group. Unlike other comedy groups of its time, Warkop was the only one whose jokes were considered intellectual. Understandably, they were all educated people from renowned universities and actively involved in campus activities, a rarity at the time. Their jokes and witticisms suited the tastes of young people: critical, mischievous, and silly.

== History ==
=== Early career, audio and stage era ===
In end of September 1973, Kasino Hadiwibowo (Kasino) and Nanu Mulyono (Nanu) performed comedy at the "Perkampungan Universitas Indonesia" (University of Indonesia Villages) a student camp in Cibubur. Their humorous performance caught the attention of Temmy Lesanpura, a University of Indonesia senior who was then head of Prambors Radio. He then invited them to appear on a show with Rudy Badil called "Obrolan Santai di Warung Kopi." This program airs every Thursday night from 8:30 pm to 10:30 pm and containing packaged in the form of short student jokes, folklore, and even parody songs.

A year later, Wahjoe Sardono (Dono) joined the show and Indrodjojo Kusumonegoro (Indro) is also joined to this group 3 years later. Warkop Prambors began to appear on television screens through the program Terminal Musikal - Tempat Anak Muda Mangkal, directed by Mus Mualim, on New Year's Eve 1978, from there they often appeared on TVRI. Unfortunately, Rudy Badil decided to stepped down due to stage frige. He later focused to become Kompas journalist until his retirement in 2005, and died on 11 July 2019.

=== Film era ===
In 1979, Warkop making their film debut entitled Mana Tahaaan. At the time, their personnel are portraying their radio characters respectively (Dono as Slamet, Kasino as Sanwani, Indro as Paijo and Nanu as Poltak). This film successfully gathered an audiences of up to 400,816 viewers. But after one film, Nanu decided to stepped down for academic reason and pursued a solo career. He later appeared in another film, Kisah Cinta Rojali dan Zuleha. He died on 22 March 1980 and was buried in Tanah Kusir Cemetery. The remaining members continue to produce most of their work over 1979 – 1995, starring in 34 comedy films and 1 docudrama film. On average, two film titles are released each year ahead of Eid Mubarak and New Year's Eve celebration.

To this day, people still often referring Warkop films as "Dono films." Indro, representing Warkop, investigated this phenomenon by consulting a psychologist. Indro concluded that the word "Dono" is easy to remember because it consists of two syllables and is also placed at the beginning of the acronym "DKI", which is associated with Warkop DKI.

=== Television era ===
In 1996, Warkop started work on a comedy soap opera called 'Warkop DKI' produced by Soraya Intercine Films and broadcast on Indosiar. This soap opera features Warkop DKI with Karina Suwandi as Dono's sister and Indro's wife and Roweina Umboh as Kasino's wife. But one year later, Kasino was rarely seen and occasionally appeared wearing a wig (because he wassuffering a brain tumor and undergoing chemotherapy at the time). He died on 18 December 1997.

Without Kasino, they are unable to using Warkop DKI (because DKI stand for Dono, Kasino and Indro) and change their name to Warkop and produced another soap opera called Warkop Millenium. Contrary to first soap opera, this is more likely to a made-for-television format and directed by a various directors (even Dono himself). On 30 December 2001, Dono died of lung cancer and was buried in Tanah Kusir Cemetery, leaving Indro as a sole member of Warkop. In 2004, Soraya Intercine Films producing another soap opera called Warkop (unofficially titled Cewek Oke Cowok Oke) and lasted for 14 episodes.

=== Post Warkop era ===
On 13 March 2019, Falcon Pictures started a spinoff project called "Warkop DKI Reborn" and starring a different actors who portrays Dono, Kasino and Indro respectively (Indro himself is not involved along with the character Dono and Kasino, but he is portraying another character and serving as an executive producer). Falcon Pictures can produced this, because Falcon Pictures are also buying some of the Warkop film's copyright (see footnotes for the further explanations).

== Discography ==
Year	Title	Note(s)	Publisher(s)	Ref.
1979	Cangkir Kopi	First Warkop Album. Recorded live in Palembang.	Pramaqua (Prambors and Aquarius)	
1979	Warung Tenda	Containing 2 sides. Side A recorded live in Jakarta & Bandung, while side B recorded live in Pontianak. Also contained parody songs for the first time.	Pramaqua (Prambors and Aquarius)	
1979	Warung Kopi & Om PSP	Recorded during TVRI's 16th Birthday Celebration. Collaboration with Orkes Moral Pancaran Sinar Petromaks. This is Nanu's last appearance in Warkop.	DD Records	
1980	Mana Tahan	Recorded only 3 members for the first time, after Nanu stepped down (despite Nanu's photo is remain intact in this album, taken from the film Mana Tahaan...)	Purnama Records	
1981	Dokter Masuk Desa	Recorded with drama comedy radio format for the first time.	Purnama Records	
1982	Gerhana Asmara	Recorded live in Jakarta and Solo. Collaboration with Srimulat Group.	JAL Records	
1983	Pengen Melek Hukum		Insan Records	
1984	Semua Bisa Diatur		Insan Records	
1984	Pokoknya Betul		Insan Records	
1986	Sama Juga Bohong	Last time Warkop using Warkop Prambors name (likely to avoid royalty payment to Prambors.)	Sokha	
1987	Makin Tipis Makin Asyik	Recorded using Warkop DKI name for the first time (DKI stand for Dono, Kasino and Indro). Also include quote "tertawalah sebelum tertawa itu dilarang" (please laugh before laugh is forbidden) for the first time. Indro explained that this slogan emerged when the personnel felt worried because the comedy they presented was considered dangerous to some parties, especially during New Order	Union Artist and AD Records	
1987	Kunyanyikan Judulku	Last Warkop album	Harpa	

== Filmography ==
Most Warkop films were unable to be distributed internationally due to copyright infringement concerns. Including the unauthorized or uncredited use of Henry Mancini's The Pink Panther theme song, although the symphony's melody in some films has been altered to avoid a significant similarity.

In 2021, some of the titles were available on Netflix and Disney+. But start from 10 February 2026, some of the titles in Netflix will be deleted from the catalogue.

Year	Title	Production Company	Note(s)	Ref.
1979	Mana Tahaaan	Bola Dunia Film	First Warkop film. The only film to be featured Nanu.	
1980	Gengsi Dong	Bola Dunia Film	First Warkop film with 3 remaining members	
1981	GeEr - Gede Rasa	Bola Dunia Film		
1981	Pintar Pintar Bodoh (Note: MVP Pictures currently hold the copyright of this film)	Parkit Film	First time Warkop using their own names instead of radio characters	
1981	Untukmu Indonesiaku (film)	Nusantara Film	The only Warkop non comedy film	
1981	Manusia 6.000.000 Dollar	Bola Dunia Film	Inspired and parodied the 1970s American television series, The Six Million Dollar Man	
1982	IQ Jongkok (Note: Falcon Pictures currently hold the copyright of this film)	Nugraha Mas Film		
1982	Setan Kredit	Nugraha Mas Film	The only Warkop comedy horror film.	
1982	Dongkrak Antik	Parkit Film		
1983	CHIPS (Warkop Film)	Nugraha Mas Film	Inspired and parodied the 1970s and 1980s American television series, CHiPs.	
1983	Maju Kena Mundur Kena	Parkit Film		
1984	Pokoknya Beres	Parkit Film	Indirect sequel of Maju Kena Mundur Kena	
1984	Tahu Diri Dong	Parkit Film	The only Warkop film using anti piracy advisory before the film begin	
1984	Itu Bisa Diatur	Parkit Film		
1985	Gantian Dong	Parkit Film		
1985	Kesempatan dalam Kesempitan	Parkit Film		
1986	Sama Juga Bohong	Garuda Film	Last time Warkop using Warkop Prambors name	
1986	Atas Boleh Bawah Boleh	Soraya Intercine Films	First time Warkop using Warkop DKI name	
1987	Makin Lama Makin Asyik	Soraya Intercine Films		
1987	Depan Bisa Belakang Bisa	Soraya Intercine Films	Inspired and parodied the Sherlock Holmes, James Bond, Pink Panther and Space Sherriff Gavan	
1988	Saya Suka Kamu Punya	Soraya Intercine Films	In this film, Dono is also a screenwriter (along with Baron Achmadi)	
1988	Jodoh Boleh Diatur	Garuda Film	The only film Warkop in overseas location (Malaysia)	
1989	Malu-Malu Mau	Soraya Intercine Films		
1989	Godain Kita Dong	Soraya Intercine Films		
1990	Sabar Dulu Doong...!	Soraya Intercine Films	First time Warkop using quote "tertawalah sebelum tertawa itu dilarang" (please laugh before laugh is forbidden), but not as an ending scene.	
1990	Mana Bisa Tahan	Soraya Intercine Films	First time Warkop film who used "Gadis Lambada" song as a soundtrack.	
1991	Lupa Aturan Main	Soraya Intercine Films		
1991	Sudah Pasti Tahan	Soraya Intercine Films	First time Warkop using sketch comedy during credit title (unlike the previous films, a credit title is appear from start and throughout before the film begin).	
1992	Bisa Naik Bisa Turun	Soraya Intercine Films	First time Warkop using quote "tertawalah sebelum tertawa itu dilarang" (please laugh before laugh is forbidden) as ending credit (along with "Gadis Lambada" as a soundtrack)	
1992	Masuk Kena Keluar Kena	Soraya Intercine Films		
1993	Salah Masuk	Soraya Intercine Films		
1993	Bagi-Bagi Dong	Soraya Intercine Films	The only Warkop films (along with Bebas Aturan Main) using "Sekian" (The End) instead of usual ending credit (also appearing thank you note)	
1994	Bebas Aturan Main	Soraya Intercine Films	The only Warkop films (along with Bagi Bagi Dong) using "Sekian" (The End) instead of usual ending credit	
1994	Saya Duluan Dong	Soraya Intercine Films		
1995	Pencet Sana Pencet Sini	Soraya Intercine Films	Last Warkop film	

== See also ==
- Indonesian comedy
- Cinema of Indonesia
