= Nanu Moeljono =

Indonesian actor and comedian (1952–1983)

Nanu
- Born: Nanu Moeljono; 16 November 1952; Jakarta, Indonesia
- Died: 22 March 1983 (aged 30); Jakarta, Indonesia
- Burial place: Tanah Kusir Public Cemetery, Kebayoran Lama, South Jakarta
- Education: University of Indonesia
- Occupations: Actor; comedian
- Years active: 1973–1983
- Known for: Member of Warkop

Nanu Moeljono (EYD: Nanu Mulyono; 16 November 1952 – 22 March 1983) was an Indonesian actor and comedian. He was known as a member of Warkop before deciding to resign.

== Profile ==
Nanu Moeljono was born in Jakarta on 16 November 1952. He is the sixth of seven children born to a Javanese father and a Sundanese mother. He studied at the University of Indonesia, majoring in sociology. When he was in college, he was one of the students taught by Dono. According to Dono's diary, Nanu did not pass Dono's class with one of the reasons being that he was often absent from class. Nanu is also known as a member of the University of Indonesia Nature Lovers Student Group (Mapala UI) with Dono and Kasino.

Nanu started his career with the Warkop group in 1973 on Prambors radio. Then continued with playing a film in 1979 entitled Mana Tahaaan... before then choosing to resign from the group by reason of wanting to focus on other things. During his time as a member of Warkop, Nanu played the character of Poltak who was described as a Batak. He then played in the film Kisah Cinta Rojali dan Zuleha in the same year which later became his last film role.

== Death ==
Nanu died on 22 March 1983, at Dr. Cipto Mangunkusumo Hospital due to kidney disease (nephrotic syndrome). His body was buried in the Tanah Kusir public cemetery, South Jakarta.

== Filmography ==
- Mana Tahaaan... (1979)
- Kisah Cinta Rojali dan Zuleha (1979)
