= Raam Punjabi =

Indian-Indonesian film and television producer

- Born: Raam Jethmal Punjabi; October 6, 1944 (age 82); Surabaya, Japanese-occupied East Indies
- Occupation: Film producer
- Years active: 1967–present
- Known for: Founder of Multivision Plus
- Spouse: Raakhee Punjabi
- Children: 2
- Relatives: Dhamoo Punjabi (brother); Manoj Punjabi (nephew)

Raam Jethmal Punjabi (born 6 October 1944) is an Indonesian media magnate and president of Multivision Plus (MVP). In 2001, due to his production of soap operas, he was referred to as "Indonesia's own soap king".

== Early life ==
He was born in Surabaya, East Java to parents of Indian (Sindhi) descent. His nephew is Manoj Punjabi, who co-founded MD Entertainment.

== Career ==
=== Filmography ===
As producer

- Special Silencers (1979)
- Bodoh-bodoh mujur (1981)
- Ferocious Female Freedom Fighters (1982)
- Kamp tawanan wanita (1983)
- Itu bisa diatur (1984)
- The Stabilizer (1986)
- Pengantin Baru
- Pembalasan rambu (1986)
- Java Burn (1988)
- The Intruder (1989)
- Kabut asmara (1994)
- Panji manusia milenium (2001) (TV series)
- Bidadari (2001) (TV series)
- Kiss Kis Ko (2004)
- Buruan cium gue! (2004)
- Satu kecupan (2004)
- Jatuh cinta lagi (2006)
- Kuntilanak (2006)
- Kangen (I Miss You) (2007)
- Kuntilanak 2 (2007)
- Pulau hantu (2007)
- Kawin kontrak (2008)
- Kuntilanak 3 (2008)
- D.O. (Drop Out) (2008)
- Pulau hantu 2 (2008)
- Kawin kontrak lagi (2008)
- MBA: Married by Accident (2008)
- Kirun + Adul (2009)
- Jamila dan Sang Presiden (2009)
- Punk in Love (2009)
- Nazar
- Toilet 105 (2010)
- Soekarno: Indonesia Merdeka

As executive producer

- Petualangan 100 Jam (2004)
- Pesan dari surga (2006)

As writer

- Perawan rimba (1983)
- Kamp tawanan wanita (1983)
