= Farida Arriany =

Indonesian actress, model, and singer (1938–1977)

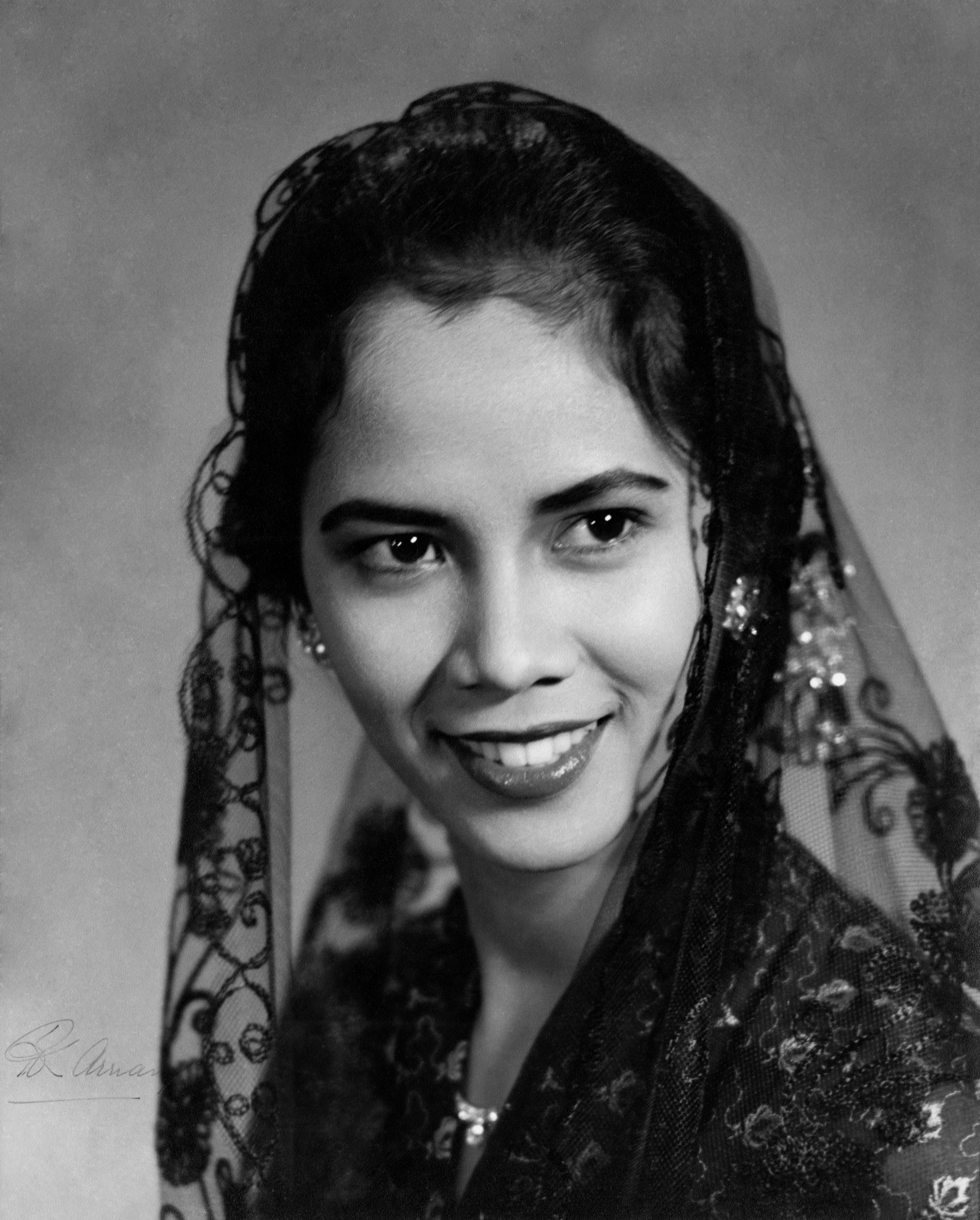
- Arriany in c. 1960
- Born: Frieda Thenu; 24 November 1938; Bandung, Dutch East Indies
- Died: 15 October 1977 (aged 38); Jakarta, Indonesia
- Other names: Frieda Shagniarty
- Occupations: Actress; model; singer
- Years active: 1953–1977
- Spouse: Sri Budoyo
- Children: 4

Frieda Thenu (24 November 1938 – 15 October 1977), better known by the stage name Farida Arriany, also known as Frieda Shagniarty, was an Indonesian actress, model, and singer. She was named the most successful Indonesian film star in the 1960s.

== Early life ==
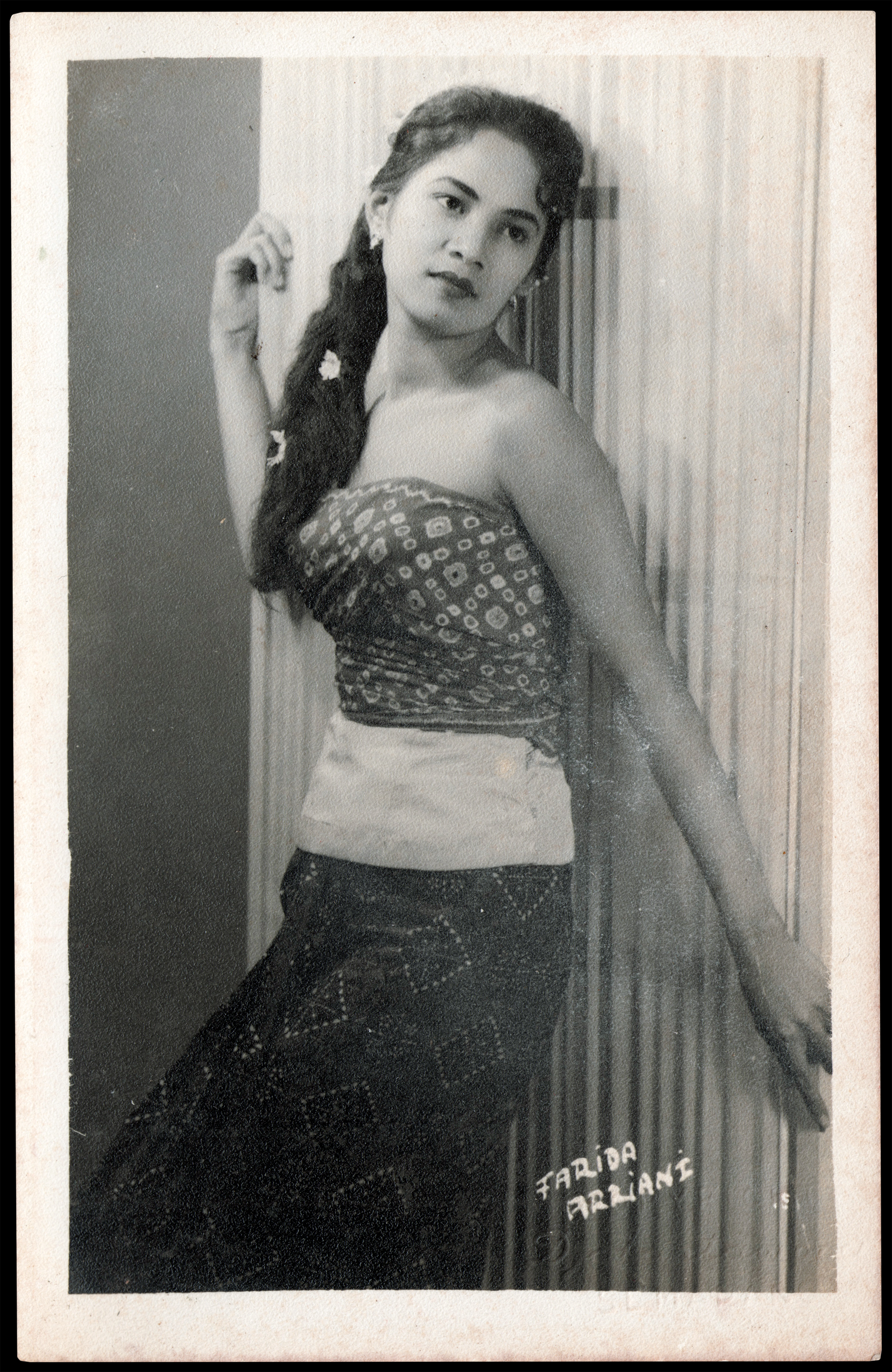
Arriany c. 1955

Farida Arriany was born Frieda Thenu on 24 November 1938 in Bandung, West Java. Her younger sister, Onny Arriany, was an Indonesian child actress who starred with her in Anakku Sajang (1957) and Arriany (1958). She completed a junior high school education.

== Personal life ==
=== Marriages, relationship, and children ===
Arriany was reported to have had affairs with several men, such as Wim Tomasoa, Sukarno M. Noor, and Sudomo. She was married to Sri Budoyo, an entrepreneur who was the president of PR Nusan Tour Data Development Corp and PT Nusan Data Investmen Corp. They had four children: Ary Dewanti, Sri Resphaty, Trisno Subroto, and Ario Sutejo.

=== Illness and death ===
During the filming of Yoan (1977), Arriany suffered a fall from epilepsy. On 28 September 1977, she was rushed to Husada Hospital in Central Jakarta, due to appendicitis and cirrhosis. Arriany then underwent surgery but later died on 15 October, due to complication from the disease at the age of 38.

== Career ==
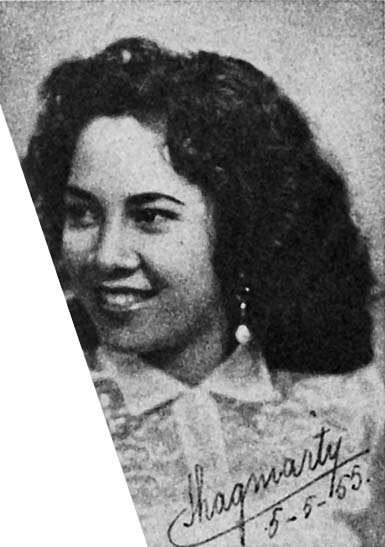
Arriany in Tjemburu (1953), credited as Frieda Shagniarty

Arriany started her acting career by appearing in Tjemburu (1953), along with Nurnaningsih. She made her feature film debut in 1955, taking the role of Sari in Golden Arrow's Kasih Ibu (A Mother's Love). She was credited as Frieda Shagniarty in this film, only taking the stage name Farida Arriany some time later. She appeared in eighteen further films in the following six years. These included the role of Atikah in Air Mata Ibu (A Mother's Tears, 1957), a remake of the 1941 film of the same name; Lastri in Anakku Sajang (My Dear Child, 1957), for which she won Best Leading Actress at the 1960 Indonesian Film Week; and a role in Pedjuang (Warriors for Freedom, 1961), which was screened in competition at the 2nd Moscow International Film Festival in 1961.

In the early 1960s, Arriany founded her own film company, the Farida Arriany Film Corporation. JB Kristanto's Indonesian film catalogue lists the company as only producing a single film, Kami Bangun Hari Esok (We Wake Tomorrow, 1963); this was the first Indonesian film shot in CinemaScope. In his encyclopedia of film figures, however, Misbach Yusa Biran writes that the company completed two films, as well as Road to Bali (1968), a collaborative project with Japan.

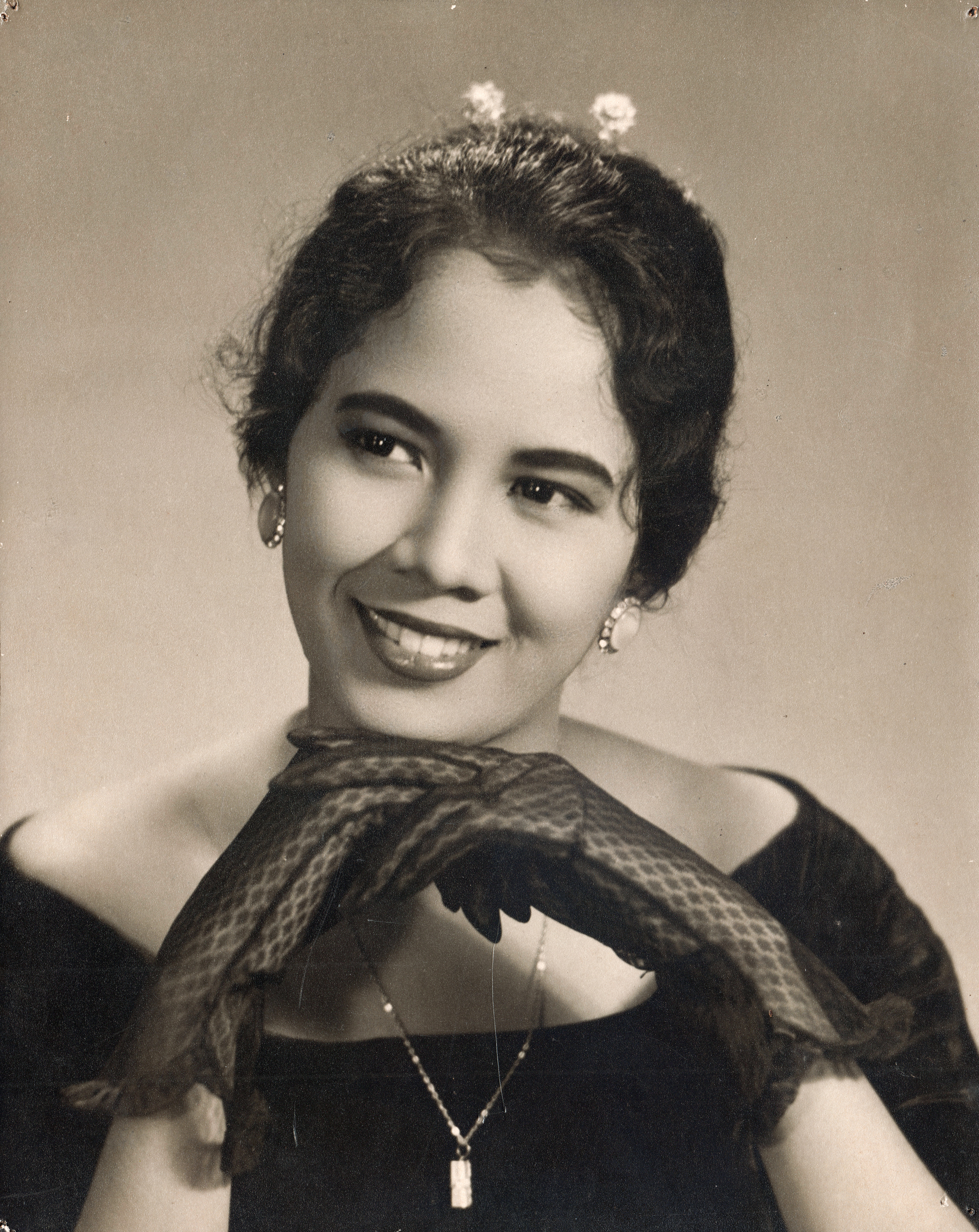
Arriany in c. 1962

During the mid-1960s Arriany did not act in any films. She returned in 1969 with two roles: as a singer in Sjumandjaja's Apa Jang Kau Tjari, Palupi? (What Are You Seeking, Palupi?) and in Wim Umboh's Laki-Laki Tak Bernama (Man Without a Name). Over the next eight years she took numerous supporting roles, including in Lewat Tengah Malam (After Midnight, 1971), Salah Asuhan (Wrong Upbringing, 1972), and Menanti Kelahiran (Awaiting Birth, 1977).

Arriany was an active promoter of tourism. She was also involved in an organisation supporting older actors. In 1975 she was appointed Second Treasurer for the Indonesian Film Actors Union. Her term would have ended in 1978.

== Filmography ==
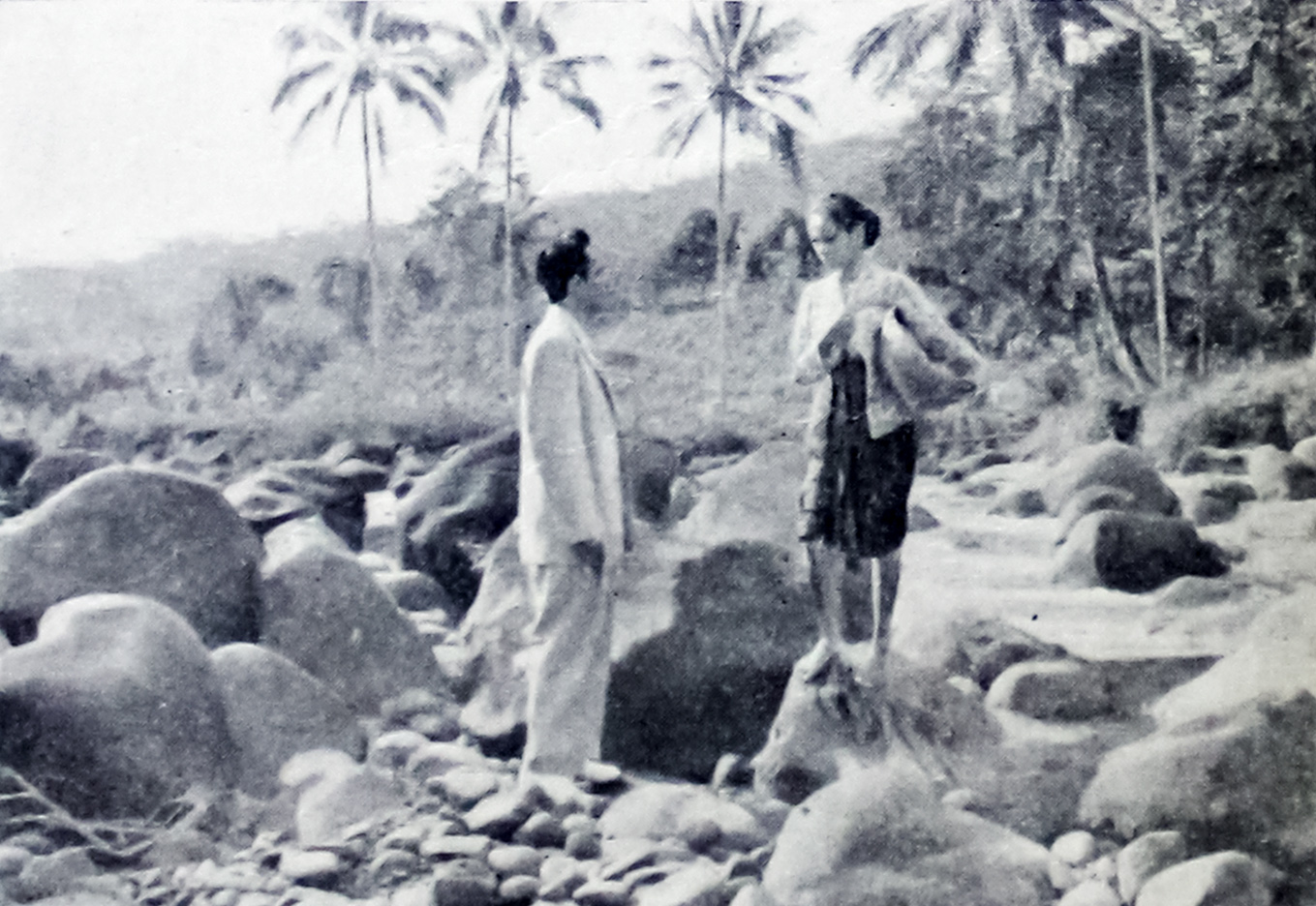
A Sarosa and Arriany in Gambang Semarang (1955)

During her twenty-four-year career, Arriany appeared in more than forty films.

- Tjemburu (1953)
- Kasih Ibu (1955)
- Gambang Semarang (1955)
- Sampai Berdjumpa Kembali (1955)
- Melati Sendja (1956)
- Tudjuan (1956)
- Air Mata Ibu (1957)
- Anakku Sajang (1957)
- Bermain Api (1957)
- Arriany (1958)
- Bunga dan Samurai (1958)
- Titi-Tito (1958)
- Wanita Indonesia (1958)
- Laki-laki Tak Bernama (1969)
- Apa jang Kau Tjari, Palupi? (1969)
- Ajam den Lapeh (1960)
- Istana yang Hilang (1960)
- Pedjuang (1960)
- Tugas Baru Inspektur Rachman (1960)
- Badja Membara (Nila Meulila) (1961)
- Seribu Langkah (1000 Langkah) (1961)
- Sungai Ular (1961)
- Dendam Berdarah (1970)
- Djalang (1970)
- Hidup, Tjinta dan Air Mata (1970)
- Lewat Tengah Malam (1971)
- Impas (0 x 0) (1971)
- Sanrego (1971)
- Tjisadane (1971)
- Njanjian Air Mata (1972)
- Salah Asuhan (1972)
- Anak Yatim (1973)
- Pelarian (1973)
- Sebatang Kara (1973)
- Benyamin Si Abunawas (1974)
- Melawan Badai (1974)
- Fajar Menyingsing (1975)
- Aladin Agen Rahasia (1975)
- Menanti Kelahiran (1976)
- Noda dan Asmara (1977)
- Senyum Nona Anna (1977)
- Yoan (1977)
