= Rima Melati =

Indonesian actress (1937–2022)

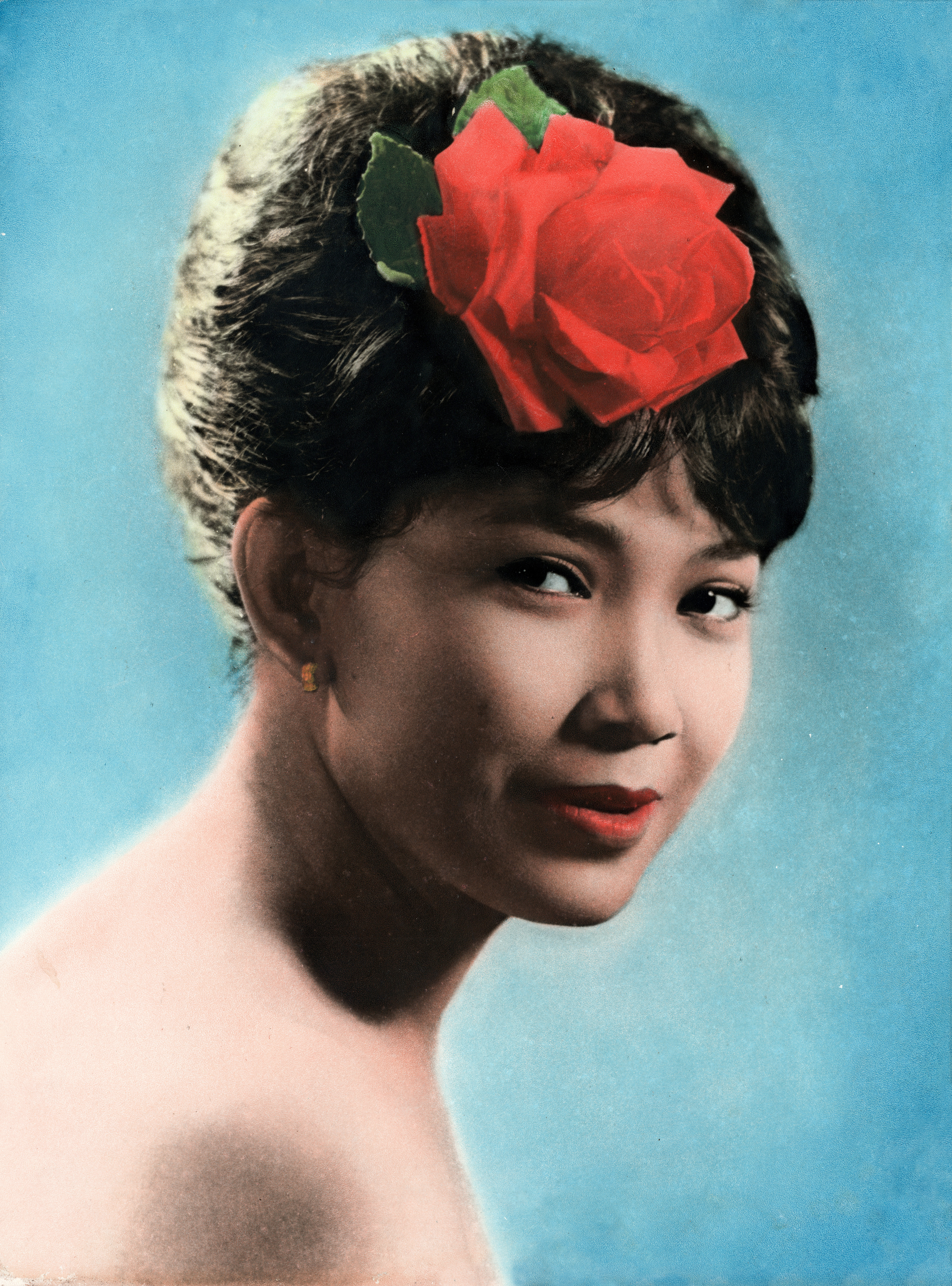
- Melati c. 1960
- Born: Marjolien van Rest; 22 August 1939; Tondano, Dutch East Indies
- Died: 23 June 2022 (aged 82); Jakarta, Indonesia
- Occupations: Actress; model; singer; director
- Spouses: Iwan Kartowiyono (divorced) Nelson Tobing (m. 1963, divorced) Herwindo Soewondo (divorced) Frans Tumbuan (m. 1973; died 2015)

Marjolien Tambayong (August 22, 1939 – June 23, 2022), better known by her stage name Rima Melati or by her nickname Lientje, was an Indonesian actress, model, and singer. She appeared in close to one hundred feature films, including works by Wim Umboh, Sjumandjaja, and Teguh Karya. She received multiple awards, including a PWI Award for Best Actress for Noda Tak Berampun (Unforgivable Smear), a Citra Award for Best Leading Actress for Intan Berduri (A Thorned Gem, 1972), and five nominations for the Citra Award for Best Supporting Actress.

Melati also worked as a fashion designer and, together with her husband Frans Tumbuan, as a restaurateur. After surviving breast cancer in the 1990s, she campaigned for breast cancer awareness.

== Biography ==
Marjolein Tambayong was born in Tondano, Sulawesi, Dutch East Indies, on 22 August 1939. Though her father Marinus Van Rest was Dutch, she took the family name of her step-father, Tambayong. She moved to Jakarta and became a model, using the diminutive form of her name, "Lientje". In the late 1950s, she became a member of the girl group The Baby Dolls; this group also included Indriati Iskak, Gaby Mambo, and Baby Huwae. In 1958, Tambayong made her feature film debut with a minor role in Djuara Sepatu Roda (Roller-Skating Champion), a film that starred Indriati Iskak.

In 1960s, Tambayong decided to use a stage name "Rima Melati". Several sources, including the Encyclopedia of Jakarta, write that this occurred following the stillbirth of a child she had wanted to name Rima after Audrey Hepburn's character in Green Mansions; when she broached the subject with President Sukarno, he recommended that she take the name for herself, as her birth name was "too western" (Indonesian: terlalu kebarat-baratan). In an interview with The Jakarta Globe, however, Tambayong stated that she had received the name when she had gone to the presidential palace to get petrol. She was invited to meet President Sukarno and he said that her name was too Western. Tambayong then combined the name of Hepburn's character with Melati ("jasmine"), the name of a friend's daughter.

Rima Melati took her first leading role in the 1961 film Kasih Tak Sampai (Unrealized Love). Over the following two years, she acted in a further ten films, including Djantung Hati (Heart and Soul, 1961), Violetta (1962), and Kartika Aju (The Beautiful Kartika, 1963). Melati married Nelson Tobing in 1963 and also made several appearances on the newly established State television network, TVRI. After finishing Kunanti Jawabmu (I Await Your Answer, 1963), Melati took a hiatus from acting; the Encyclopedia of Jakarta attributes this to her having remarried.

Melati returned to the screen in 1969 after marrying Ir. Herwindo, with a role in Wim Umboh's Laki-Laki Tak Bernama (Man Without a Name). Over the next twenty years, she appeared in more than seventy films, including Teguh Karya's directorial debut Wadjah Seorang Laki-Laki (Ballad of a Man, 1971), Sjumandjaja's directorial debut Lewat Tengah Malam (After Midnight, 1971), and the Indonesia–Netherlands collaboration Max Havelaar (1975). She received multiple awards and nominations during this period, including a Citra Award for Best Leading Actress at the 1973 Indonesian Film Festival for Intan Berduri (A Thorned Gem, 1972).

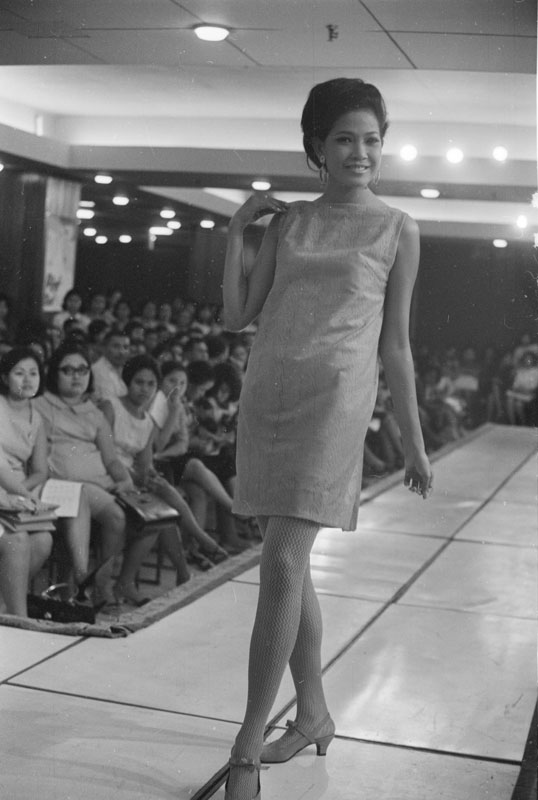
Melati as a model (1967)

Melati also was interested in fashion design. Together with Sumi Hakim and Gaby Mambo, she formed a modeling group called "The Prof's Group". Composed of 40 models, this group aimed to showcase more radical fashion exhibitions than what was mainstream in Indonesia. Melati organised one of the first formal fashion shows in the country. The ensuing publicity helped the group to travel abroad to American shows in Malibu and Hawaii, as well as to Europe.

In 1973, she traveled with Sumi Hakim and Emilia Contessa to the Netherlands for a month-long show sponsored by Pertamina. During this trip, Melati met Frans Tumbuan, and they married later that year. They had two children named Aditya Tumbuan (born 30 June 1975) and Keke Tumbuan (born 17 September 1978), both of whom were born in Jakarta. Tumbuan, a restaurateur who was living in the Netherlands at the time, moved to Jakarta with her. The couple opened several restaurants, including La Bistro, La Bodega, and Jaya Pub; this last one, established in 1975, is Jakarta's oldest bar and has been described as "iconic". Tumbuan also began acting, making his feature film debut in Bung Kecil (Little Man); this film began production in 1978 but was only released in 1983 owing to difficulties with the censorship bureau. Melati and Tumbuan remained together until the latter died in 2015.

In 1980, Melati along with Indonesian lawyer and former actress Nurbani Yusuf founded Yayasan Kesejahteraan Artis Perintis Film Indonesia (KARFINI), a charitable foundation that provided financial assistance to Indonesian film industry actors and actresses who were active in the 1940s and 1950s. In 1989, shortly after shooting Sesaat dalam Pelukan (A Moment's Embrace), Melati was diagnosed with Stage 3B breast cancer. She underwent treatment for one and a half years, traveling to the Netherlands as Indonesian surgeons were unable to perform a partial mastectomy. She did not return to cinema until 1994, when she appeared in Sesal (Regret). Directed by her friend Sophan Sophiaan, the film starred Sophiaan as a writer who was unable to accompany his wife (played by Widyawati) on her deathbed. In 1997 Melati directed the television serial Api Cinta Antonio Blanco (The Flame of Antonio Blanco's Love), based on the life of Antonio Blanco, a Spanish-American painter who settled in Bali.

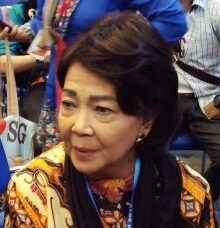
Melati in 2019

Melati made several films after the turn of the millennium, including Banyu Biru (Blue Water, 2004), Ungu Violet (Purple Violet, 2005), and Ayah, Mengapa Aku Berbeda? (Father, Why Am I Different?, 2011). In a 2012 interview, she stated that she had no intention of returning to film or television, but she made further appearances in 2016 and 2017. She remained active as a fashion designer, and campaigned for breast cancer awareness through the Jakarta Breast Health Foundation.

== Death ==
Melati died at Gatot Soebroto Army Hospital in Jakarta on 23 June 2022 at the age of 82. She was admitted to the intensive care unit days before her death after suffering decubitus.

== Filmography ==
In her career, which spanned more than five decades, Melati appeared in almost a hundred films. She also directed Api Cinta Antonio Blanco (1997), which was released in cinemas as two separate films: Blanco, the Colour of Love (1997) and Bali Forever (2007).

- Djuara Sepatu Roda (1958)
- Amor dan Humor (1961)
- Djantung Hati (1961)
- Darmawisata (1961)
- Kasih Tak Sampai (1961)
- Notaris Sulami (1961)
- Violetta (1962)
- Bermalam di Solo (1962)
- Hadiah 2.000.000 (1962)
- Ballada Kota Besar (1963)
- Kartika Aju (1963)
- Penjeberangan (1963)
- Big Village (1969)
- Laki-laki Tak Bernama (1969)
- Dan Bunga-bunga Berguguran (1970)
- Noda Tak Berampun (1970)
- Bengawan Solo (River of Love) (1971)
- Biarlah Aku Pergi (1971)
- Lewat Tengah Malam (1971)
- Jang Djatuh Dikaki Lelaki (1971)
- Kekasihku Ibuku (1971)
- Rakit (1971)
- Rina (1971)
- Wadjah Seorang Laki-Laki (1971)
- Mama (1972)
- Salah Asuhan (1972)
- Dosa Siapa (1972)
- Intan Berduri (1972)
- Tjintaku Djauh Dipulau (1972)
- Ayah (1973)
- Bapak Kawin Lagi (1973)
- Takdir (1973)
- Ali Baba (1974)
- Anak Bintang (1974)
- Perawan Malam (1974)
- Susana (1974)
- Gaun Pengantin (1974)
- Max Havelaar (Saijah dan Adinda) (1975)
- Widuri Kekasihku (1976)
- Wajah Tiga Perempuan (1976)
- Pinangan (1976)
- Bulu-Bulu Cendrawasih (1978)
- Kabut Sutra Ungu (1979)
- Busana dalam Mimpi (1980)
- Di Sini Cinta Pertama Kali Bersemi (1980)
- Tali Merah Perkawinan (1981)
- Bukan Impian Semusim (1981)
- Jangan Ambil Nyawaku (1981)
- Detik-detik Cinta Menyentuh (1981)
- Sekuntum Mawar Putih (1981)
- Perkawinan 83 (1982)
- Di Balik Kelambu (1982)
- Kupu-kupu Putih (1983)
- Rahasia Buronan (1983)
- Kembang Kertas (1984)
- Tinggal Landas Buat Kekasih (1984)
- Bercinta dalam Badai (1984)
- Saat-Saat yang Indah (1984)
- Serpihan Mutiara Retak (1985)
- Damai Kami Sepanjang Hari (1985)
- Romantika (Galau Remaja di SMA) (1985)
- Pondok Cinta (1985)
- Kulihat Cinta di Matanya (1985)
- Kidung Cinta (1985)
- Matahari-Matahari (1985)
- Melintas Badai (1985)
- Merpati Tak Pernah Ingkar Janji (1986)
- Telaga Air Mata (1986)
- Secawan Anggur Kebimbangan (1986)
- Biarkan Bulan Itu (1986)
- Di Balik Dinding Kelabu (1986)
- Pengantin Baru (1986)
- Ayahku (1987)
- Kecil-kecil Jadi Pengantin (1987)
- Cintaku di Rumah Susun (1987)
- Aku Benci Kamu (1987)
- Arini (Masih Ada Kereta yang Akan Lewat) (1987)
- Setegar Gunung Batu (1988)
- Harga Sebuah Kejujuran (1988)
- Seputih Kasih Semerah Luka (1988)
- Ayu dan Ayu (1988)
- Arini II (Biarkan Kereta Api Itu Lewat) (1988)
- Sesaat dalam Pelukan (1989)
- Kanan Kiri OK (1989)
- Dua dari Tiga Laki-laki (1989)
- Kristal-kristal Cinta (1989)
- Lupus III (Topi-topi Centil) (1989)
- Kanan Kiri OK II (1989)
- Oppassen!!! (1993)
- Sesal (1994)
- Cinta Silver (2004)
- Banyu Biru (2004)
- Ungu Violet (2005)
- Saus Kacang (2008)
- Bebek Belur (2010)
- Satu Jam Saja (2010)
- Senggol Bacok (2010)
- Ayah, Mengapa Aku Berbeda? (2011)

== Awards and nominations ==
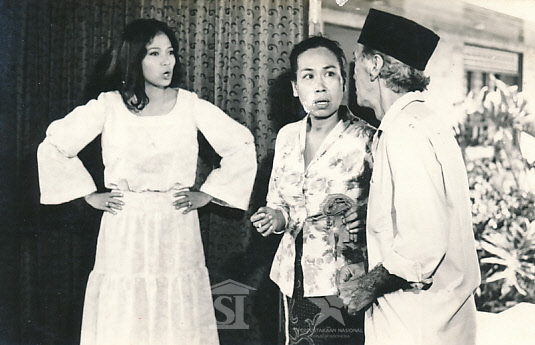
Melati, left, in Rakit (1970)

Melati won Best Actress at the 1971 PWI Awards, held by the Jakarta branch of the Indonesian Journalists Association, for her role as Marina in Noda Tak Berampun (Unforgivable Smear); she received three further nominations in that category, in 1972, 1973, and 1974, but did not win again.

At the 1973 Indonesian Film Festival, Melati won a Citra Award for Best Leading Actress for her portrayal of Saleha in Intan Berduri. In the late 1980s she was nominated for five Citra Awards for Best Supporting Actress, but did not receive any.

Year	Award	Category	Recipients	Result	Ref.
Indonesian Film Festival	1973	Citra Award for Best Leading Actress	Intan Berduri	Won	
Indonesian Film Festival	1984	Citra Award for Best Supporting Actress	Kupu-kupu Putih	Nominated	
Indonesian Film Festival	1985	Citra Award for Best Supporting Actress	Tinggal Landas Buat Kekasih	Nominated	
Indonesian Film Festival	1986	Citra Award for Best Supporting Actress	Pondok Cinta	Nominated	
Indonesian Film Festival	1987	Citra Award for Best Supporting Actress	Biarkan Bulan Itu	Nominated	
Indonesian Film Festival	1989	Citra Award for Best Supporting Actress	Arini II (Biarkan Kereta Api itu Lewat)	Nominated	

== Works cited ==
- Apa Siapa Orang Film Indonesia [What and Who: Film Figures in Indonesia] (in Indonesian). Jakarta: Indonesian Ministry of Information. 1999. OCLC 44427179.
- Dewi, Sita W. (5 May 2014). "Regulars Bid Farewell to Jakarta's Oldest Bar". The Jakarta Post. Archived from the original on 20 September 2016.
- Kristanto, JB, ed. (2007). Katalog Film Indonesia 1926–2007. Jakarta: Nalar. ISBN 978-979-26-9006-4.
- "Marjolien Tambajong" [Marjolien Tambajong]. filmindonesia.or.id (in Indonesian). Jakarta: Konfiden Foundation. Archived from the original on 16 June 2016.
- "Marjolien Tambajong – Filmografi" [Marjolien Tambajong – Filmography]. filmindonesia.or.id (in Indonesian). Jakarta: Konfiden Foundation. Archived from the original on 7 May 2017.
- "Marjolien Tambajong – Penghargaan" [Marjolien Tambajong – Awards]. filmindonesia.or.id (in Indonesian). Jakarta: Konfiden Foundation. Archived from the original on 24 September 2016.
- Novanda, Regina (5 March 2016). "Nama Rima Melati Adalah Pemberian Soekarno" [The Name Rima Melati Was Given by Soekarno]. Bintang (in Indonesian). Archived from the original on 17 August 2016.
- "Rima Melati". Ensiklopedi Jakarta (in Indonesian). Jakarta: Jakarta City Government. Archived from the original on 13 August 2016.
- Simanjuntak, Tertiani ZB (24 March 2015). "Obituary: Actor, Restaurateur Frans Tumbuan Dies at 76". The Jakarta Post. Archived from the original on 20 September 2016.
- Siregar, Lisa (21 September 2012). "Rima Melati Has a Story Of Celebrity, And Survival". The Jakarta Globe. Archived from the original on 11 February 2017.
- "Mendirikan karifina". Tempo (in Indonesian). 3 May 1980. Archived from the original on 17 January 2023.
- "Indonesia's Veteran Actress Rima Melati Passes Away at 84". Tempo. 23 June 2022.
- "Rima Melati Dies After Struggling With Decubitus, Know Facts About Her Disease". VOI.id. 23 June 2022.
- "Majalah Varia Remaja edisi Oktober 1973". Majalah Varia Remaja (in Indonesian). Archived from the original on 17 January 2023 – via Seide.id.
