= Satan's Slave =

Satan's Slave may refer to:

- Satan's Slave (1976 film), a British independent supernatural horror film
- Satan's Slave (1980 film), an Indonesian horror film
- Satan's Slaves, a 2017 Indonesian horror film
