= Ami Priyono =

Indonesian film director and actor

- Born: Lembu Amiluhur Priyawardhana Priyono; 23 October 1939; Batavia, Dutch East Indies
- Died: 6 June 2001 (aged 61); Jakarta, Indonesia
- Occupations: Director, actor
- Spouse: Julia Suryakusuma
- Awards: 3 Citra Awards

H Lembu Amiluhur Priyawardhana Priyono (23 October 1939 – 6 June 2001), generally referred to as Ami Prijono (Perfected Spelling: Ami Priyono) was an Indonesian film director and actor. He was married to the feminist writer Julia Suryakusuma.

== Biography ==
Born in Batavia (now Jakarta) on 23 October 1939, Ami was the only child of Priyono, a politician-cum-educator who later became Minister of Education and Culture, and his wife Iwanah. After graduating from senior high school Ami left for Moscow, where he studied cinema at the All-Union State Institute of Cinematography.

After returning to Indonesia Ami began teaching at the National Theatre Academy in Jakarta. In 1968 he joined the domestic film industry, taking the role of artistic director in Djampang Mentjari Naga Hitam (Djampang Seeks the Black Dragon). He made his acting debut two years later in Tuan Tanah Kedawung as a supporting actor. In 1974 he married feminist writer Julia Suryakusuma.

At the 1974 Indonesian Film Festival Ami's artistic direction in Ambisi (Ambition) garnered him a Citra Award. That year he made his directorial debut with Dewi. His other film directed that year, Karmila, was adapted from the novel of the same name by Marga T. The film – the second most lucrative Indonesian movie of the year – is credited with generating interest in film adaptations over the following decade. He went on to become one of four directors to dominate the local film industry in the 1970s. After Lonceng Maut (Bell of Doom) in 1976 Ami abandoned artistic direction, focusing on his acting and directing.

In 1977 Ami released Jakarta Jakarta. Focusing on the miserable daily lives of the capital's inhabitants, the film won five Citra Awards at the 1978 Indonesian Film Festival in Ujungpandang, including Best Film, Best Director, and Best Screenplay (shared with N. Riantiarno). In 2009 Ben Murtaugh of SOAS, University of London, described the film as "a fascinating portrayal of [Jakarta] during the 1970s".

Ami's Roro Mendut, released in 1982, gave him his greatest international recognition. The film, which was based on an Indonesian legend and written by Y. B. Mangunwijaya, garnered him another Best Director nomination at the 1983 Indonesian Film Festival; he lost to Teguh Karya, director of Di Balik Kelambu. Ami received another nomination the following year for Yang, but lost to Sjumandjaja of Budak Nafsu. He directed his final film, Jodoh Boleh Diatur (Love can be Arranged), in 1988.

With the number of domestic film productions decreasing in the early 1990s, Ami left the cinema and began directing and acting for television, beginning with Salah Asuhan (Wrong Upbringing; 1994; as director) and Pedang Keadilan (Sword of Justice; 1996). During this period he served on the juries of several film festivals, including the Indonesian Serial Festival (Festival Sinetron Indonesia, 1994 and 1996), the Asia Pacific Film Festival (1995), and the Fukuoka International Film Festival (1996). He died on 6 June 2001, after several years of ill health.

== Filmography ==
Ami acted in 34 films and was a crew member in 22. He directed twelve movies.

=== Cast ===
- Tuan Tanah Kedawung (1970)
- Beranak dalam Kubur (1971)
- Mama (1972)
- Si Bongkok (1972)
- Anjing-Anjing Geladak (1972)
- Laki-Laki Pilihan (1973)
- Ita Si Anak Pungut (Nobody's Child) (1973)
- Romi dan Juli (1974)
- Christina (1977)
- Ombaknya Laut Mabuknya Cinta (1978)
- Kasus (Kegagalan Cinta) (1978)
- Roda-Roda Gila (1978)
- Ali Topan Detektif Partikelir Turun ke Jalan (1979)
- Bayang-bayang Kelabu (1979)
- Kabut Sutra Ungu (1979)
- Hati Selembut Salju (Garis-garis Cakrawala) (1981)
- Gundala Putra Petir (1981)
- Remang-remang Jakarta (1981)
- Untukmu Kuserahkan Segalanya (1984)
- Yang Masih di Bawah Umur (1985)
- Kidung Cinta (1985)
- Keluarga Markum (1986)
- Bintang Kejora (1986)
- Cas Cis Cus (Sonata di Tengah Kota) (1989)
- Kipas-kipas Cari Angin (1989)
- Pengantin (1990)
- Sejak Cinta Diciptakan (1990)
- Oom Pasikom (Parodi Ibukota) (1990)
- Boneka dari Indiana (1990)
- Olga dan Sepatu Roda (1991)
- Pengantin Remaja (1991)
- Selembut Wajah Anggun (1992)
- Ramadhan dan Ramona (1992)
- Badut-badut Kota (1993)
- Sesal (1994)

=== Crew ===
- Djampang Mentjari Naga Hitam (1968) – as artistic director
- Apa jang Kau Tjari, Palupi? (1969) – as artistic director
- Lewat Tengah Malam (1971) – as artistic director
- Jang Djatuh Dikaki Lelaki (1971) – as artistic director
- Matinja Seorang Bidadari (1971) – as artistic director
- Anjing-Anjing Geladak (1972) – as artistic director
- Laki-Laki Pilihan (1973) – as artistic director
- Ambisi (1973) – as artistic director
- Ita Si Anak Pungut (Nobody's Child) (1973) – as artistic director
- Dewi (1974) – as director
- Karmila (1974) – as director
- Semalam di Malaysia (1975) – as artistic director
- Lonceng Maut (1976) – as artistic director
- Kampus Biru (1976) – as director and scriptwriter
- Kenangan Desember (1976) – as director
- Jakarta Jakarta (1977) – as director, scriptwriter, and story writer
- Dr Siti Pertiwi Kembali ke Desa (1979) – as director
- Untukmu Indonesiaku (1980) – as director
- Bukan Impian Semusim (1981) – as director
- Roro Mendut (1982) – as director
- Yang (1983) – as director
- Pertunangan (1985) – as director
- Jodoh Boleh Diatur (1988) – as director

== Works cited ==
- "Ami Priyono" (in Indonesian). Taman Ismail Marzuki. Archived from the original on 19 June 2010.
- "Ami Priyono". Encyclopedia of Jakarta (in Indonesian). Jakarta City Government. Archived from the original on 29 July 2013.
- "Filmografi Lembu Amiluhur Priyawardhana Priyono" [Filmography for Lembu Amiluhur Priyawardhana Priyono]. Filmindonesia.or.id (in Indonesian). Jakarta: Konfiden Foundation. Archived from the original on 6 March 2016.
- "Indonesian Movie Gems". The Jakarta Post. 29 October 2009. Archived from the original on 9 April 2013.
- "Lembu Amiluhur Priyawardhana Priyono". Filmindonesia.or.id (in Indonesian). Jakarta: Konfiden Foundation. Archived from the original on 3 April 2014.
- "Karmila". filmindonesia.or.id. Jakarta: Konfiden Foundation. Archived from the original on 16 June 2013.
- "Penghargaan Di Balik Kelambu" [Awards for Di Balik Kelambu]. filmindonesia.or.id (in Indonesian). Jakarta: Konfiden Foundation. Archived from the original on 27 August 2015.
- "Penghargaan Roro Mendut" [Awards for Roro Mendut]. filmindonesia.or.id (in Indonesian). Konfiden Foundation. Archived from the original on 31 August 2014.
- "Penghargaan Yang" [Awards for Yang]. filmindonesia.or.id (in Indonesian). Konfiden Foundation. Archived from the original on 7 November 2017.
- "Roro Mendut". filmindonesia.or.id (in Indonesian). Konfiden Foundation. Archived from the original on 3 April 2014.
- Sen, Krishna (2006). "'Chinese' Indonesians in National Cinema". In Sun, Wanning (ed.). Media and the Chinese Diaspora: Community, Communications and Commerce. London: Routledge. pp. 119–136. ISBN 978-0-415-35204-8.
- Suryakusuma, Julia (18 April 2012). "Will Indonesia ever grow a Steel Orchid?". The Jakarta Post. Archived from the original on 8 December 2012.
