= El Manik =

Indonesian actor (born 1949)

- Born: Emmanuel Ginting Manik; 19 November 1949 (age 76); Bohorok, North Sumatra, Indonesia
- Other name: El Manik
- Occupation: Actor
- Years active: 1973–present

Emmanuel Ginting "El" Manik (born 19 November 1949) is an Indonesian actor of Karo descent.

== Biography ==
El Manik was born on 19 November 1949 in Bohorok, North Sumatra to an ethnic Batak Karo teacher. He graduated from Bohorok State Elementary School in 1962, then Taman Siswa Middle School in 1965 and Teachers' College in 1969, both in Binjai. After graduation, he moved to Surabaya and opened a photo studio.

After passing a test to get into the Film and Music Institute of Jakarta, El Manik sold his equipment and moved to Jakarta. However, after discovering that he had been conned he lived as a vagrant behind the Ismail Marzuki Cultural Centre. In 1973, he received a bit part in Mereka Kembali (They Return), directed by Nawi Ismail; he received Rp.5,000 for his role.

After his work in Mereka Kembali, El Manik received more supporting roles, including as an antagonist in Teguh Karya's 1973 film Cinta Pertama (First Love) and in Ami Priyono's film Kampus Biru (Blue Campus). His first leading role was in Ami's 1979 film Jakarta Jakarta; that same year he played a Dutch officer in Karya's war epic November 1828. During this period, he also worked as a reporter for Aktuil.

This was followed by a role in 1983's Titian Serambut Dibelah Tujuh (Titian Serambut Divided by Seven) and a leading role in Sjumandjaja's 1984 film Budak Nafsu (Slave to Lust). However, after the Indonesian cinema industry collapsed in 1992 he switched to playing in soap operas.

El Manik directed Pacar Dunia Akhirat (Lover in the Afterlife) in 1996; he later switched to directing soap operas, including 1998's Panggung Sandiwara (Stage for Sandiwara) and Titipan Illahi (Saved for God).

After the revival of Indonesian cinema in 2002, El Manik became more active in the film industry. He played in Beth (2002), Biarkan Bintang Menari (Let the Stars Dance; 2003), and, in 2006, in Nia Dinata's film Berbagi Suami (Love for Share).

== Filmography ==
- Mereka Kembali (They Return; 1973)
- Cinta Pertama (First Love; 1973)
- Kampus Biru (Blue Campus; 1976)
- Kabut Sutra Ungu (Mist of Purple Silk; 1980)
- November 1828 (1979)
- Cinta Segitiga (Love Triangle; 1979)
- Dr. Siti Pertiwi Kembali ke Desa (Dr. Siti Pertiwi Returns to the Village; 1980)
- Putri Seorang Jendral (Daughter of a General; 1981)
- Seputih Hatinya, Semerah Bibirnya (As White as Her Heart, As Red as Her Lips; 1982)
- Jakarta Jakarta (1982)
- Pasukan Berani Mati (Soldiers Willing to Die; 1982)
- Titian Serambut Dibelah Tujuh (Titian Serambut Divided by Seven; 1982)
- Budak Nafsu (Slave to Passion; 1983)
- Hati Yang Perawan (A Virgin Heart; 1984)
- Bajing Ireng dan Jaka Sembung (Jaka Sembung & Bergola Ijo, or The Warrior and the Ninja; 1985)
- Carok (1985)
- Hell Raiders (1985)
- Menumpas Teroris (Fighting Terrorists; 1986)
- Bintang Kejora (Lucky Stars; 1986)
- Biarkan Bulan Itu (Let the Moon Be; 1986)
- Tujuh Manusia Harimau (Seven Human Tigers; 1987)
- Turangga (1990)
- Beth (2002)
- Biarkan Bintang Menari (Let the Stars Dance; 2003)
- Maskot (Mascot; 2006)
- Berbagi Suami (Love for Share; 2006)
- Anak Ajaib (Magic Child; 2008)
- Ketika Cinta Bertasbih (When Love Prays; 2009)
- Dalam Mihrab Cinta (Behind Love's Shield; 2010)

== Awards and nominations ==
Year	Award	Category	Work	Result
1979	Indonesian Film Festival	Citra Award for Best Leading Actor	Gara-gara Istri Muda	Nominated
1979	Indonesian Film Festival	Citra Award for Best Supporting Actor	November 1828	Won
1980	Indonesian Film Festival	Citra Award for Best Supporting Actor	Kabut Sutra Ungu	Nominated
1981	Indonesian Film Festival	Citra Award for Best Supporting Actor	Dr. Siti Pertiwi Kembali ke Desa	Won
1983	Indonesian Film Festival	Citra Award for Best Leading Actor	Titian Serambut Dibelah Tujuh	Nominated
1984	Indonesian Film Festival	Citra Award for Best Leading Actor	Budak Nafsu	Won
1984	Indonesian Film Festival	Citra Award for Best Supporting Actor	Jaka Sembung dan Bajing Ireng	Nominated
1987	Indonesian Film Festival	Citra Award for Best Leading Actor	Biarkan Bulan Itu	Nominated
2004	MTV Indonesia Movie Awards	Most Favorite Supporting Actor	Biarkan Bintang Menari	Nominated
2006	Indonesian Film Festival	Citra Award for Best Supporting Actor	Berbagi Suami	Won
