= Ruth Pelupessy =

Indonesian actress (1938–1996)

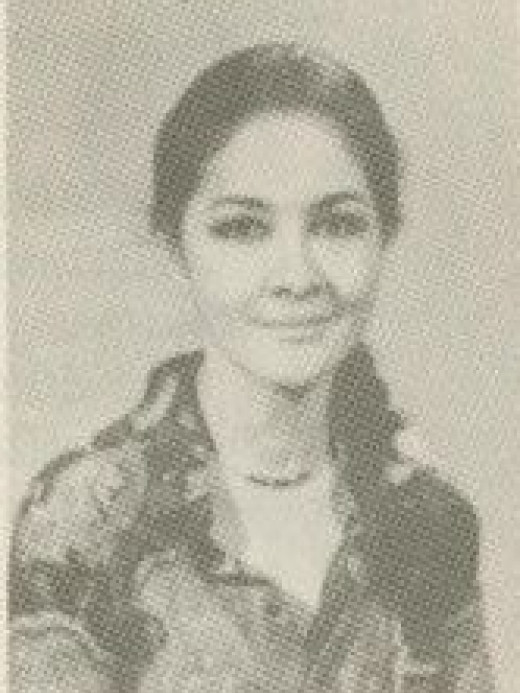
- Born: 27 April 1938; Bangka Island, Bangka Belitung Islands, Dutch East Indies
- Died: 21 October 1996 (aged 58); Jakarta, Indonesia
- Burial place: Kampung Kandang Cemetery
- Occupations: Actress; model; entrepreneur
- Years active: 1972–1983, 1989
- Spouse: Hendra Cipta (m. 1977; div. 1979)
- Children: 2
- Awards: Citra Award for Best Supporting Actress (1976)

Ruth Pelupessy (27 April 1938 – 21 October 1996) was an Indonesian actress, model, and entrepreneur. She typically played antagonists in Indonesian horror films. She is most known for her role in Rahasia Perawan (1976), which earned her the Citra Award for Best Supporting Actress, and as Darmina in Satan's Slaves (1980).

== Early life and education ==
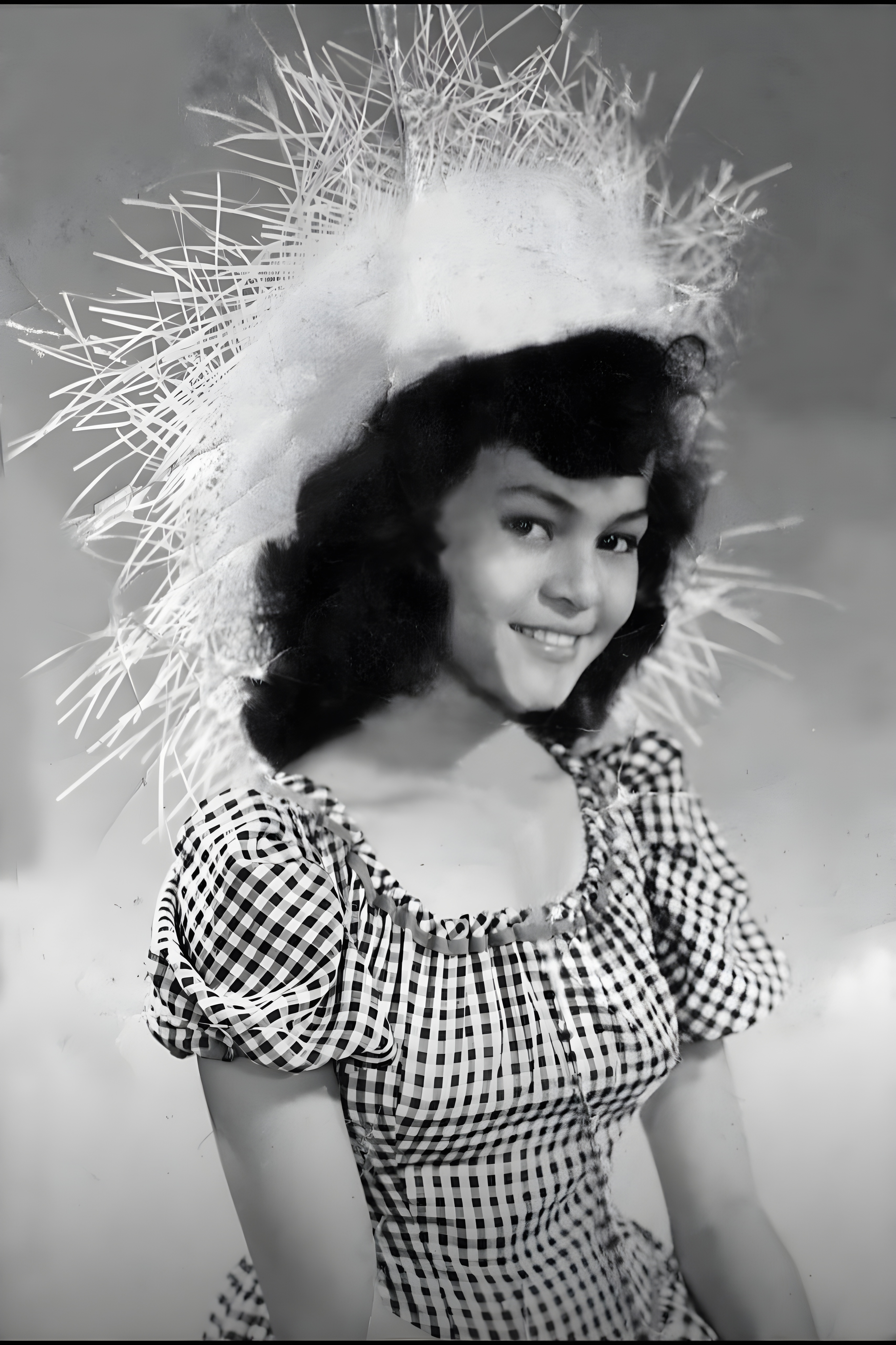
Pelupessy as a child

Pelupessy was born on 27 April 1938 in Bangka Island, Bangka Belitung Islands. She attended Girls' Skills Teacher School until the second grade.

== Career ==
Pelupessy started her career as a model with the Indonesian Modelling Agency (IMA), even though she was married. Indonesian director and writer Asrul Sani considered Pelupessy suitable to play the character of Corry and cast her in Salah Asuhan (1972), an adaptation of the 1928 novel of the same title by Abdul Muis. Initially, she only wanted to appear on screen once, but according to Sani, she "couldn't let go."

Pelupessy starred in films including Badai Remaja (1973), Tokoh (1973), Timang-Timang Anakku Sayang (1974), Rahasia Perawan (1975), Ranjang Siang Ranjang Malam (1976), Rosita (1978), Cinderella (1978), Ira Maya Si Anak Tiri (1979), and others. Her roles in films were always as antagonists and "evil" women such as pimps, prostitutes, or stepmothers.

At the 1976 Indonesian Film Festival, Pelupessy won Citra Award for Best Supporting Actress for her role in Rahasia Perawan which was directed by Ali Shahab. The producer of the film, Hendrik Gozali, was surprised by her win and accepted the award on her behalf, stating that "I didn't expect her to win at all, so I didn't invite her to Bandung, she came with another producer." She then starred in Satan's Slave (1980) as Darmina and in Perkawinan Nyi Blorong (1983).

Pelupessy appeared in a comedy film with the Warkop comedy trio group titled Sabar Dulu Dong...! (1989). She portrayed Mevrouw Rudolf in the film, a hotel guest who caused a commotion because she walked in her sleep.

Alongside her acting career, Pelupessy was also a bamboo furniture entrepreneur.

== Personal life ==
=== Marriages, relationship, and children ===
Pelupessy was married twice. Her first marriage resulted in two children. In 1974, Pelupessy lived together with actor Hendra Cipta and was married him at civil registration in May 1977. She saw Cipta reciting the Quran and asked what it meant. Cipta answered that he didn't know and Pelupessy replied by saying "how do you pray if you don't know the meaning." to which Cipta answered again "what is important to me, carry out obligations, meaning the obligation to pray" and she replied back by saying "how would I convert to Islam if you just don't know what it means.". The conflict then became increasingly sharp and each confirmed their own religion with Pelupessy who was Protestantism and Cipta who was Muslims. She then said angrily "If I had known this, we wouldn't have gotten married in the first place.". They later divorced in January 1979 with Pelupessy said "now, I have to love God first, then man, otherwise God will jealous.".

== Death ==
Pelupessy died in Jakarta, Indonesia, on 21 October 1996, aged 58. She was buried at the Kampung Kandang Cemetery.

== Awards and nominations ==
Year	Award	Category	Title	Result	Ref
1976	Indonesian Film Festival	Best Supporting Actress	Rahasia Perawan	Won	
