= Pelupessy =

Pelupessy is a Moluccan surname. Notable people with the surname include:

- Joey Pelupessy (born 1993), Indonesian footballer
- Ruth Pelupessy (1938-1996), Indonesian actress, model, and entrepreneur
