= Salah Asuhan (film) =

- Directed by: Asrul Sani
- Screenplay by: Asrul Sani
- Story by: Abdoel Moeis
- Based on: Salah Asuhan by Abdoel Moeis
- Produced by: Andy Azhar
- Starring: Dicky Zulkarnaen; Ruth Pelupessy; Rima Melati
- Cinematography: Sjamsuddin Jusuf
- Edited by: Janis Badar
- Music by: Frans Haryadi
- Production companies: Taty & Sons Jaya Film
- Release date: December 1972 (Indonesia)
- Running time: 98 minutes
- Country: Indonesia
- Language: Indonesian

Salah Asuhan (literally Wrong Upbringing, released internationally as The Misfit) is a 1972 film directed by Asrul Sani, produced by Andy Azhar, and starring Dicky Zulkarnaen, Ruth Pelupessy, and Rima Melati. Adapted from Abdoel Moeis' 1928 novel of the same name, it tells of a man who betrays his upbringing for the metropolitan life, while at the same time marrying an Indo woman instead of the one chosen by his mother.

Sani attempted to update the story to fit 1970s Indonesia, although the majority of the plot remained the same; critics have doubted his success, noting anachronistic worldviews. Salah Asuhan was runner-up for two awards given by the Indonesian Reporters' Society.

== Plot ==
The Minangkabau Muslim Hanafi (Dicky Zulkarnaen) returns to West Sumatra after spending several years studying in Europe, paid for by his maternal uncle. In return, the uncle expects Hanafi to marry his cousin, Rapiah (Rima Melati). Hanafi, however, has become westernised and explicitly denounces the traditions his mother (Fifi Young) holds dear. He is also in love with his friend Corrie du Bussee (Ruth Pelupessy), who is half-French. Corrie's father (E. Draculic) tells her to go to Jakarta, as he fears that she will be unable to refuse Hanafi's advances. She does so, and Hanafi is married to Rapiah, although he soon shows himself to be an abusive husband.

Hanafi soon falls ill and is sent to Jakarta for treatment, where he meets Corrie. The two marry and move in together, leading to Hanafi becoming further westernised and, ultimately, a poor husband. While he is at work Corrie often meets with Tante Lim, a Chinese woman who, unknown to Corrie, is a procurer of prostitutes. Lim gives Corrie many gifts in effort to have Corrie become a prostitute, but when Corrie becomes aware of this goal she throws Lim out.

Hanafi, however, has seen the two women talking and spreads a rumour that Corrie has stooped to prostitution; he later divorces her. This leads Corrie to become estranged from society and she soon falls ill, forgiving Hanafi on her deathbed. Hanafi returns to his home in Sumatra to apologise to his mother and Rapiah for how he treated them before stepping out the door. His mother stops Rapiah from interfering, saying that he is now beyond all human help.

== Production ==
Salah Asuhan was directed by Asrul Sani and produced by Andy Azhar of Taty & Sons Jaya Film. The crew included Sjamsuddin Jusuf on camera, Nazar Ali as artistic director, Frans Haryadi as music director, and Janis Badar as editor. Sani adapted the film's story from Abdoel Moeis' 1928 novel of the same name, which had been set in the 1920s and emphasised Hanafi's want to become Europeanised. The novel has been considered a major piece of Indonesian literature and Moeis' finest work.

Before primary shooting began but after the film was announced, domestic film critics questioned how it could be faithful to the novel when most of the settings in the novel had changed since it was written. Sani, however, modernised the story and set it in 1970s Indonesia. The American visual anthropologist Karl G. Heider wrote that the result Indonesianised Minang culture, giving the drift from the matrilineal culture evidenced in the novel with the more standard patrilineal culture found in the Indonesian archipelago. The main plot points of both the film and novel, however, remained the same.

The film starred Dicky Zulkarnaen as Hanafi, Rima Melati as Rapiah, and Ruth Pelupessy as Corrie. More minor roles were taken by Fifi Young, E. Draculic, Mohamad Mochtar, Farida Arriany, Jasso Winarto, Fakhri Amrullah, and Dewi Rais.

== Techniques and themes ==
As in many of his earlier productions, Sani exploits the natural beauty of West Sumatra in Salah Asuhan; the film critic Salim Said wrote that the result harkened to the works of contemporary Japanese film directors, who were capable of effectively utilising their settings.

Heider noted that scenes showing Corrie drinking alcohol and wearing a mini skirt suggested to Indonesian audiences that she did not have the inner strength to reject Hanafi's advances. The drinking of alcohol also serves as a symbol of Westernisation; as Hanafi becomes more Europeanised, he takes up the practice — one which forbidden by his Islamic faith. Heider also noted Corrie's deathbed scene as reflecting the dominant Minangkabau mores, as, although Hanafi holds her hands, their palms never touch; he wrote that touching palms was more taboo than kissing in Indonesian cinema at the time.

Heider divides the main characters of Salah Asuhan into four quadrants, representing two binary opposites: Indonesian/Western, and Modern/Traditional. He classifies Hanafi and Corrie as falling into a modern/western type, with Liem best fitting the group (although poorly, owing to the emphasis on her Chineseness in the film). The parents of Hanafi and Corrie are both traditional, with Hanafi's mother matching the Indonesian/traditional and Mr DeBussee matching the Western/traditional type; he places Rapiah and her father into the Indonesian/traditional grouping, although they are not as extreme as Hanafi's mother. He notes only one character in the Indonesian/modern grouping, Corrie's landlady in Jakarta.

== Release and reception ==
Salah Asuhan was released in December 1972. It received two nominations from the Indonesian Reporters' Society (Persatuan Wartawan Indonesia), placing as first runner up for Best Actor and third runner up for best actress. A VHS copy remains on archive at Sinematek Indonesia.

Said wrote that Sani had failed to make Salah Asuhan truly modern, instead simply providing updated costumes and settings without updating the psychological aspects. This left the work, in Said's opinion, lacking believable motives and ultimately becoming "a tiresome emptiness". Heider likewise suggests that the novel lost much of its power during adaptation, adding that the characters remain stable in their respective quadrants and thus do not "seriously show the dynamics of modernization".

In 1973, the voice of Ruth Pelupessy who played Corrie had to be re-dubbed because it was considered too smooth and did not match the character she portrayed. Pelupessy later expressed her disappointment to Sani's wife, Mutiara, due to a unilateral dubbing decision without any announcement, and she felt that Corrie's new voice was too monotonous.

== Works cited ==
- Heider, Karl G (1991). Indonesian Cinema: National Culture on Screen. Honolulu: University of Hawaii Press. ISBN 978-0-8248-1367-3.
- Said, Salim (1991). Pantulan Layar Putih: Film Indonesia dalam Kritik dan Komentar [Song of the White Screen: Indonesian Films in Critique and Commentary] (in Indonesian). Jakarta: Sinar Harapan. ISBN 978-979-416-137-1.
- "Salah Asuhan". filmindonesia.or.id (in Indonesian). Konfidan Foundation. Archived from the original on 12 January 2014.
- "Salah Asuhan | Kredit" [Salah Asuhan | Credits]. filmindonesia.or.id (in Indonesian). Konfidan Foundation. Archived from the original on 29 June 2017.
- "Salah Asuhan | Penghargaan" [Salah Asuhan | Awards]. filmindonesia.or.id (in Indonesian). Konfidan Foundation. Archived from the original on 4 March 2016.
