= Lewat Tengah Malam =

- Theatrical poster
- Directed by: Sjumandjaja
- Screenplay by: Sjumandjaja
- Produced by: Chan Pattimura
- Starring: Rachmat Hidayat; Rima Melati; Soekarno M. Noer
- Cinematography: Akin
- Music by: Trisutji Djuliati Djulham
- Production company: Allied Film of Indonesia
- Release date: 1971 (Indonesia)
- Country: Indonesia
- Language: Indonesian

Lewat Tengah Malam (literally Past Midnight) is a 1971 Indonesian film and the first feature-length production by director Sjumandjaja. Starring Rachmat Hidayat, Rima Melati, and Soekarno M. Noer, it follows a thief named Lono who steals from the corrupt to give to the poor. The film, which may have been influenced by The Thomas Crown Affair (1968), was reportedly very tiring for the director, who briefly considered never directing again. The social realist elements led to Suharto's New Order government keeping Sjumandjaja under surveillance.

== Plot ==
Lono (Rachmat Hidayat) is a former revolutionary soldier who has become a criminal, recognised by the Alfa Romeo-produced car he drives. He robs the rich, corrupt government officials and gives the money to the poor, leaving a black glove at the scene of his crimes as a calling card. His elder brother Djoko (Soekarno M. Noer), however, is a police officer tasked with stopping Lono.

In his crimes Lono is supported by Sukma (Rima Melati), a law student whose father has been crippled in a staged hit-and-run accident for his work as an anti-corruption activist. As she falls in love with Lono, Sukma discovers his background and becomes increasingly understanding of Lono's motivations.

After Lono's final heist, a theft from a major corruptor named Ongko (Wim Umboh) in the capital city of Jakarta, he goes to his brother's house nearby. The two reminisce on old times until Djoko says that he must arrest Lono; the latter comes willingly. Sukma agrees to defend Lono in court.

== Production ==
Sjumandjaja, who had previously written several screenplays and spent six years studying film in the Soviet Union, made his feature directorial debut with Lewat Tengah Malam. He also wrote the film's story. Sjumandjaja was reportedly often ill on set owing to the shooting happening late at night; on one occasion his wife, the ballerina Farida Utoyo, was called from a vacation in Bali to deal with her husband's illness.

Lewat Tengah Malam featured Rachmat Hidayat, Rima Melati, Soekarno M. Noor, Ismed M. Noor, Rahayu Effendi, Ishaq Iskandar, Farida Arriany, Aedy Moward, and Sjumandjaja in a bit role. Chan Pattimura of Allied Film of Indonesia produced, with Akin on camera. Ami Priyono served as artistic director, while Trisutji Djuliati Djulham provided the music. Lono's backstory was explored through flashbacks.

== Themes ==
The Indonesian film critic Salim Said writes that, at the time of production, it was rumoured that only two Alfa Romeos had been imported into the country, suggesting that Lono was well-networked. Said also suggests that Sjumandjaja had "fallen in love" with Lono, through whom the director could romanticise his memories of the revolution. According to Said, Sjumandjaja did not wish to see the character imprisoned but felt compelled to do so as he viewed Indonesia as a country which recognised the rule of law. He suggests that Sjumandjaja may have been inspired by the 1968 Hollywood film The Thomas Crown Affair, while the character of Lono is reminiscent of Robin Hood.

== Release and reception ==
Lewat Tengah Malam was released in 1971. Said wrote that it showed several technical flaws which were not in the (much stronger), screenplay; these included mistakes such as poor emoting in dialogue and a lack of focus on the supporting actors.

Owing in part to Sjumandjaja's frequent illnesses on set and his success with the screenplay for Pengantin Remadja (1971), the director reportedly considered leaving directing to focus on screenwriting. However, he later went on to direct more than a dozen films. Said suggests that a sense of "artificiality" which was found in Lewat Tengah Malam's flashbacks continued to be present in the director's later films.

The social realism present in the film, a style which Sjumandjaja would keep for the rest of his career, led to Suharto's New Order government keeping the director under surveillance. The Indonesian film database filmindonesia.or.id, handled by the National Library of Indonesia and Sinematek, suggests that Lewat Tengah Malam remains one of Sjumandjaja's best films.

== Works cited ==
- Ardan, S. M. (October 1985). "In Memoriam: Sjuman Djaya (1934–1985)". Indonesia. 40. Ithaca: Cornell University: 122–126. Archived from the original on 5 January 2010.
- "Betulkah Syumanjaya Mau Berhenti Menyutradarai Film?" [Is it True that Syumanjaya will Stop Directing Films] (PDF). Pedoman (in Indonesian). 15 August 1971. Archived from the original (PDF) on 11 February 2012.
- "Kredit Lengkap" [Full Credits]. Filmindonesia.or.id (in Indonesian). Jakarta: Konfidan Foundation. Archived from the original on 29 June 2017.
- "Lewat Tengah Malam". Filmindonesia.or.id (in Indonesian). Jakarta: Konfidan Foundation. Archived from the original on 5 April 2014.
- Said, Salim (1991). Pantulan Layar Putih: Film Indonesia dalam Kritik dan Komentar [Song of the White Screen: Indonesian Films in Critique and Commentary] (in Indonesian). Jakarta: Sinar Harapan. ISBN 978-979-416-137-1.
