= Sungai Puar =

Town in Agam Regency, West Sumatra, Indonesia

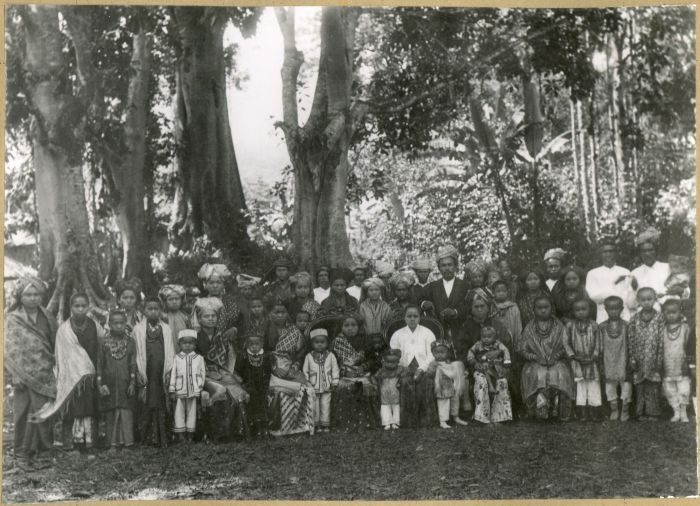
Portrait of "Soetan Suleiman" from the district of Sungai Puar

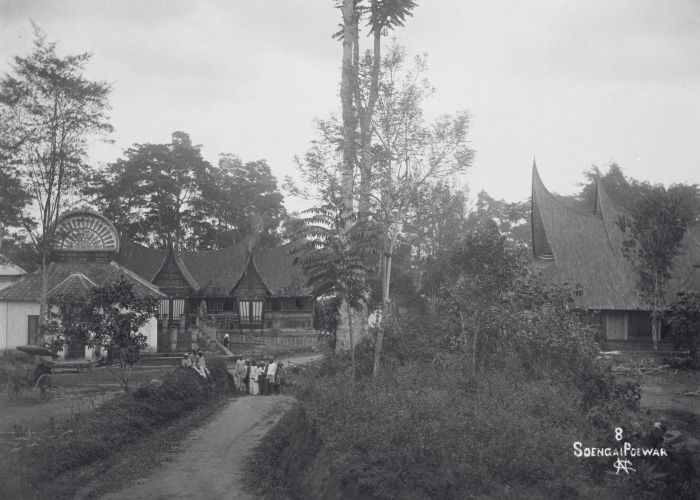

Sungai Puar (Dutch: Soengei Poear or Soengai Poear) is a town in Agam Regency, West Sumatra province, Indonesia. Writer Abdoel Moeis was born there. Sungai Puar is known for its antiques.

== Gallery ==
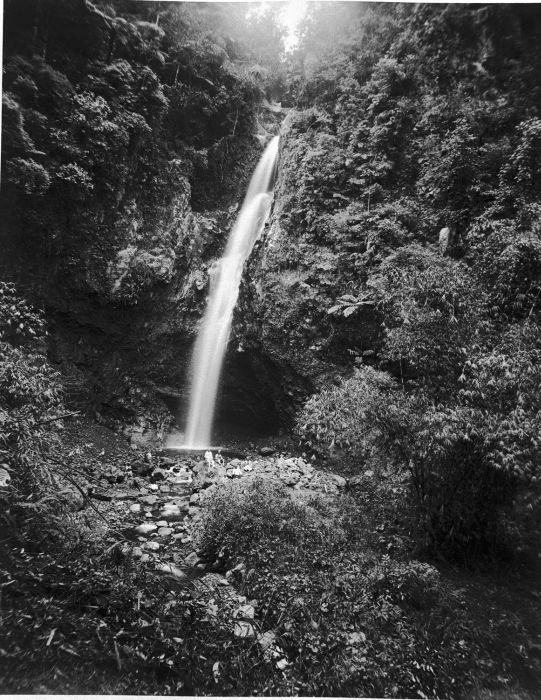
Sungei Poear waterfall near Fort de Kock

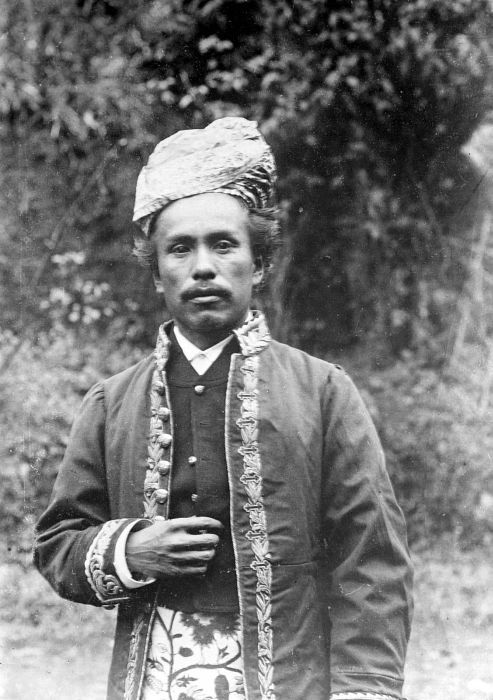
Village head of Sungai Puar

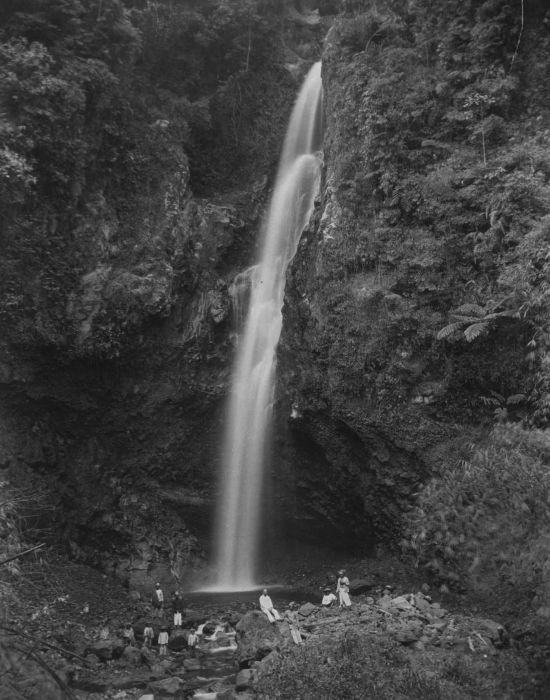
Waterfall

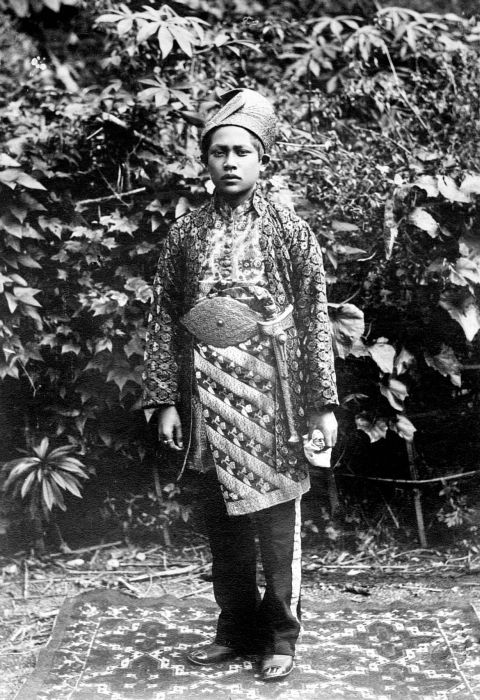
Bridegroom

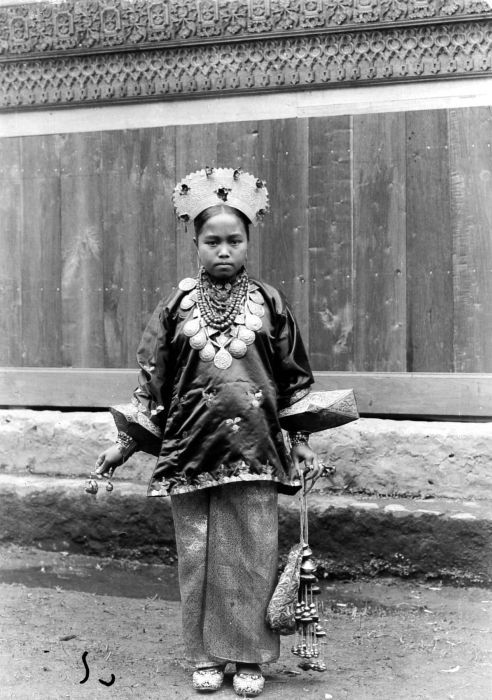
Bride
