= Sumi Hakim =

Indonesian model

- Born: 26 March 1944 (age 81); Bandung, Japanese-occupied East Indies
- Occupation: Model, fashion designer

Sumiaty "Sumi" Hakim (born 26 March 1944) is an Indonesian fashion designer and former model. She was a co-founder of The Professional Group, a modeling agency known for introducing cutting-edge fashion designs in the 1970s.

== Career ==
In 1962, Hakim was crowned the Queen of Vespa in Indonesia. She was represented by Indonesia Model Agency (IMA), one of Indonesia's first modeling agencies.

Hakim went on to form a new modeling agency, The Professional Group, with actresses Rima Melati and Gaby Mambo, taking a more active role in leading the agency as Melati and Mambo became less involved. Nicknamed "The Prof's Group", they represented 40 models and showcased more innovative fashions than what was common in Indonesia at the time. According to Hakim, Melati was instrumental in organising one of the first formal fashion shows in the country, and involved popular musical artists such as Titiek Puspa and Broery to bring their performances to life. The ensuing publicity led to engagements abroad in Malibu, Hawaii, and as far as Europe, on trips which also helped to promote Indonesia.

In 1973, she traveled with Melati and Emilia Contessa to the Netherlands for a month-long show sponsored by Pertamina.

== Later career ==
In August 2008, Sumi Hakim's fashion designs were featured in a charity fashion show, in which senior models including Rima Melati, Enny Soekamto, and Sherly Parengkuan returned to the catwalk. The Jakarta Post reported that her designs included "flowing, hand-painted silk and chiffon", "detailed beaded appliqués", and wide sleeves that created "butterfly-like silhouettes", noting that Hakim had hand-painted her blouses herself. Following the charity fundraiser, Hakim and several models over the age of 50 were honoured by the Indonesian World Records Museum (MURI) in September 2008.

In 2016, Hakim was invited to the Indonesia Vespa World Days, which coincided with the 70th anniversary of Vespa. During the festival, Hakim revealed that she had ridden a Vespa scooter for the first time only three days before winning the 1962 competition which helped to launch her career.
