= Julia Suryakusuma =

Indonesian writer

- Born: 19 July 1954 (age 71); New Delhi, India
- Occupations: Feminist, writer
- Spouses: Ami Priyono (m. 1974; died 2001) Tim Lindsey (m. 2005; div. 2016)

Julia Indiati Suryakusuma (born 19 July 1954) is an Indonesian feminist, journalist, and author. She is known for her outspoken writing on sexuality, gender, politics and religion. She has been described as Indonesia's most provocative columnist.

== Early life and education ==
The daughter of an Indonesian diplomat, Julia grew up in India (1954–56), Indonesia (1956–60), England (1960–62), Hungary (1962–64), Indonesia again (1965–68) and Italy (1968–71).

Julia attended schools in England and Hungary, in addition to Sumbangsih School in Setiabudi, South Jakarta. She studied psychology at the University of Indonesia (1974–76) and obtained a BSc. Honours in sociology from City University, London (1979), and an MSc in the politics of developing societies at the Institute of Social Studies, The Hague, (1988).

== Writing ==
Julia's 1988 thesis was titled State Ibuism: The Social Construction of Womanhood in the Indonesian New Order. It examined how the Suharto regime sought to control society by defining women as wives and mothers. This thesis was deemed subversive by the Indonesian government, and Suryakusuma was detained by the State Intelligence Agency. Writing in 2011, she attributed her release to a defense given by her former lecturer, Saparinah Sadli. In 2011, the thesis was published in a bilingual edition, in the original English and an Indonesian translation.

As Indonesia entered its post-Suharto reformation era, Julia in 1999 founded the Indonesian Political Almanac Foundation (Yayasan API), which published the Almanac of Indonesian Political Parties (1999) and the Indonesian Parliament Guide (2001).

Since 2006, Julia has written newspaper and magazine columns in English, mostly for The Jakarta Post newspaper and Tempo weekly news magazine. A collection of her columns was published in 2013 as Julia's Jihad: Tales of the Politically, Sexually, and Religiously Incorrect: Living in the Chaos of the Biggest Muslim Democracy.

She is also the author of Sex, Power and Nation: an Anthology of Writings, 1979–2003 (Metafor, 2004).

== Activism ==
After completing her sociology studies in London in 1979, Julia worked for Yayasan Indonesia Sejahtera (YIS, Prosperous Indonesia Foundation), a non-government organization dealing with community development and child health.

In February 1998, when Indonesia's economy had collapsed as a result of the Asian Financial Crisis, Julia was among a group of women activists who formed Suara Ibu Peduli (SIP, Voice of Concerned Mothers). The group on 23 February 1998 staged a small but unprecedented demonstration at Jakarta's iconic Hotel Indonesia roundabout to protest soaring prices of milk and food. It was the first anti-government protest by a women's group during then-president Suharto's 32-year regime. Playing on the regime's policy that women should serve as wives and mothers, the group legitimised its protest by complaining that it was becoming impossible for Indonesian women to balance household budgets to meet their families' basic needs. Julia served as the public relations head of the group, writing press releases on the action and the subsequent trial and conviction of three members. The group's action inspired further anti-government protests, which culminated in the resignation of Suharto in May 1998.

In 2021, in recognition of her activism for gender equality, democracy and human rights, Julia was made an Officer in the Belgian Order of the Crown.

== Personal life ==
In 1974, when she was 20 years old, Julia married Indonesian film director and actor Ami Priyono, who was aged 36. They had one child, a son, Aditya Priyawardhana, who was born in November 1975. Following the death of Ami Priyono in 2001, Julia in 2005 married Australian academic Professor Tim Lindsey, who has written several books on Indonesia. They were divorced in 2016.
