= Pertemuan Jodoh =

1932 novel by Abdul Muis

- Author: Abdul Muis
- Language: Indonesia
- Genre: Novel
- Publisher: Balai Pustaka
- Publication date: 1932
- Publication place: Indonesia
- Media type: Print (Hardback & Paperback)
- Pages: 227 (4th printing)
- ISBN: 978-979-666-576-1 (4th printing)
- OCLC: 66770709 (4th printing)
- Preceded by: Salah Asuhan
- Followed by: Surapati

Pertemuan Jodoh ([pərtəˈmuan dʒɔˈdɔh]; English: A Meeting of Soulmates) is an Indonesian novel by Abdul Muis originally published in 1932. It tells the story of two students who are driven apart by their class differences, but eventually marry.

== Plot ==
Ratna, a young student, inadvertently meets Suparta, a medical student, on a train. There, Suparta tries to find her a seat but fails because a Chinese-Indonesian couple are using the spare seats for their luggage. Upon arrival in Cimahi, Suparta escorts Ratna to her school. Pleased by Suparta's manners, Ratna and he agree to keep in contact via mail.

A few months later, Suparta proposes to Ratna via post; Ratna accepts, and leaves for Sumedang to meet Suparta's bangsawan parents. However, Suparta's mother, Nyai Raden Tedja Ningrum, is unwilling to accept Ratna as her daughter-in-law because Ratna is not of bangsawan descent.

Disappointed, Ratna decides to forget Suparta. Not long afterwards, her father's chalk business becomes bankrupt, and Ratna has to drop out of school and find a job as a salesclerk, then later at a lawyer's office and as a maid for a Dutch couple. However, one of the other maids, Jene, becomes jealous of her and tells the police that Ratna stole jewelry from her mistress. After being arrested, Ratna tries to escape but falls into a river, nearly drowning. She is brought to a hospital.

She is treated by Suparta, who has already graduated from medical school and has been looking for Ratna. Hearing her plight, Suparta hires a lawyer for her and she is declared innocent; Jene's boyfriend, Amat, is shown to have stolen the jewelry.

After being discharged from the hospital, Ratna is asked to go to rest at the Bidara Cina pavilion. There Suparta treats her and they grow closer. Once Ratna is fully healed, Suparta proposes to her again and they are married the same day.

== Reception ==
Pertemuan Jodoh is considered the opposite of Muis' earlier work, Salah Asuhan; Pertemuan Jodoh deals with feudalism, while Salah Asuhan dealt with the incompatibilities in Western and Eastern cultures. However, it has also been called a sequel of Salah Asuhan.

Mahayana et al considered the use of language "convincing", with uneducated characters using a mix of Betawi and Malay words. As a result, they consider it a result of Muis' observations while living in Batavia.

Bakri Siregar considered Pertemuan Jodoh "much weaker" than Salah Asuhan.

== Bibliography ==
- Siregar, Bakri (1962). Sedjarah Sastera Indonesia Modern [History of Modern Indonesian Literature] (in Indonesian). Jakarta: Akademi Sastera dan Bahasa "Multatuli". OCLC 63841626.
- Mahayana, Maman S.; Sofyan, Oyon; Dian, Achmad (2007). Ringkasan dan ulasan novel Indonesia modern [Summaries and Commentary on Modern Indonesian Novels]. Grasindo. ISBN 9789790250062.
