= Budak Nafsu =

- Theatrical poster
- Directed by: Sjumandjaja
- Screenplay by: Sjumandjaja
- Story by: Titie Said
- Based on: Fatima by Titie Said
- Produced by: Ram Soraya
- Starring: Jenny Rachman; El Manik
- Cinematography: Soetomo Gandasubrata
- Edited by: Norman Benny
- Music by: Idris Sardi
- Production company: Soraya Intercine Film
- Release date: 1983 (Indonesia)
- Running time: 94 minutes
- Country: Indonesia
- Language: Indonesian

Budak Nafsu (literally Slave to Lust, also known as Fatima) is a 1983 Indonesian film directed by Sjumandjaja and adapted from the 1981 novel Fatima by Titie Said. Starring Jenny Rachman and El Manik, it follows a mother who is forced to serve as a comfort woman for Japanese men stationed in British Malaya in an effort to save her daughter. The film was a commercial success, although critics have emphasised its sexual aspects.

== Plot ==
Fatima (Jenny Rachman) offers herself to be brought away by Japanese occupation forces to save her of her daughter, thus resigning herself to the fate of a comfort woman. She is one of hundreds of women sent from the Dutch East Indies (now Indonesia) to Japanese-occupied British Malaya and forced to work in a brothel. There she meets Takashi (El Manik), a kindly Japanese commander who falls in love with her. Fatima moves in with him, which protects her from the other men.

Meanwhile, Fatima works with the local rebels and helps them capture the military base. The prisoners are freed. Takashi, meanwhile, discovers Fatima's betrayal and releases her before committing suicide. Although she is able to escape the base, Fatima is not allowed to join the rebels, having caught syphilis while at the brothel. As she makes her way back to the Indies, which has since proclaimed its independence, Fatima's ship is captured by Dutch soldiers from the Netherlands Indies Civil Administration (NICA).

Fatima is forced to work in a NICA brothel for the remainder of the Indonesian National Revolution, although she remains combative. After the revolution, Fatima is released into poverty and over the years finds that even Indonesians misuse her. She falls ill and is brought to a hospital, where she is treated by the daughter she had left years earlier, now a doctor. The aged Fatima soon leaves the hospital and wanders about, looking at the neon signs advertising Japanese products.

== Production ==
Budak Nafsu was directed by Sjumandjaja. He had been raised in Batavia (modern day Jakarta) during the Japanese occupation, and when the Japanese were expanding the Kemayoran Airport, he witnessed several forced labourers being beaten to death. He adapted Budak Nafsu from the novel Fatima (1981) by Titie Said; he had initially planned on keeping the original title, and the film has also been released as Fatima.

The film starred Jenny Rachman in the leading female role of Fatima and El Manik as Takadeshi. More minor roles were taken by Sofia WD, Roy Marten, and Maruli Sitompul. Many of these actors had previous experience with the director. Sjumandjaja also had a cameo. According to El Manik, on one occasion the actor expressed concern that a Japanese commander would be unable to speak Indonesian fluently, as Sjumandjaja's screenplay called for, and that there should be Japanese-language dialogue. Sjumandjaja told him to write the dialogue himself if he wanted.

The crew included Norman Benny as editor, Soetomo Gandasubrata as cinematographer, and Djufri Tanissan as artistic director; music was provided by Idris Sardi. Budak Nafsu was the first film produced by Raam Lalchand Pridhani (credited as Ram Soraya) and his Soraya Intercine Film.

== Themes ==
In his 1991 typology of Indonesian cinema, the American visual anthropologist Karl G. Heider placed Budak Nafsu in a "Japanese period" genre, characterised by violence in excess of works showing the colonial period and the use of female nudity "only as part of the violence, never as a consequence of love". He also outlined a standard plot for these works, one reflected in Budak Nafsu. Other examples of the genre include Kadarwati, Kamp Tawanan Wanita (both 1983), and Lebak Membara (1982).

== Release and reception ==
Budak Nafsu was released in 1983 and was a commercial success. Heider described Budak Nafsu as "little more than a sex exploitation vehicle", and several other critical reviews have emphasised the vulgarity of the film.

A 35 mm copy of Budak Nafsu is available at Sinematek Indonesia.

== Awards ==
Budak Nafsu was nominated for nine Citra Awards at the 1984 Indonesian Film Festival, winning four.

Award	Year	Category	Recipient	Result
Indonesian Film Festival	1984	Best Picture		Nominated
Indonesian Film Festival	1984	Best Director	Sjumandjaja	Won
Indonesian Film Festival	1984	Best Screenplay	Sjumandjaja	Nominated
Indonesian Film Festival	1984	Best Leading Actor	El Manik	Won
Indonesian Film Festival	1984	Best Leading Actress	Jenny Rachman	Nominated
Indonesian Film Festival	1984	Best Cinematography	Soetomo Gandasubrata	Won
Indonesian Film Festival	1984	Best Artistic Direction	Djufri Tanissan	Nominated
Indonesian Film Festival	1984	Best Editing	Norman Benny	Nominated
Indonesian Film Festival	1984	Best Musical Direction	Idris Sardi	Won

== Works cited ==
- "Budak Nafsu". filmindonesia.or.id (in Indonesian). Jakarta: Konfidan Foundation. Archived from the original on 15 October 2013.
- Heider, Karl G (1991). Indonesian Cinema: National Culture on Screen. Honolulu: University of Hawaii Press. ISBN 978-0-8248-1367-3.
- Budiman, Hikmat (2002). Lubang Hitam Kebudayaan. Yogyakarta: Kanisius. ISBN 978-979-672-896-1.
- "Kredit Budak Nafsu" [Credits for Budak Nafsu]. filmindonesia.or.id (in Indonesian). Jakarta: Konfidan Foundation. Archived from the original on 18 July 2014.
- Marselli (27 July 1986). "In Memoriam Syumanjaya Cinta segi Tiga : film-wanita -dirinya" [In Memoriam Syumanjaya Love Triangle: Film-Women-Himself] (PDF). Kompas (in Indonesian). p. 42. Archived from the original (PDF) on 11 February 2012.
- "Mengenang Sjumandjaja" [Remembering Sjumandjaja] (PDF). Vista (in Indonesian). Vol. 90. 19 July 1990. pp. 46–53. Archived from the original (PDF) on 4 March 2016.
- "Penghargaan Budak Nafsu" [Awards for Budak Nafsu]. filmindonesia.or.id (in Indonesian). Jakarta: Konfidan Foundation. Archived from the original on 18 July 2014.
- "PT Soraya Intercine Film". filmindonesia.or.id (in Indonesian). Jakarta: Konfidan Foundation. Archived from the original on 7 March 2016.
- "Raam Lalchand Pridhani". filmindonesia.or.id (in Indonesian). Jakarta: Konfidan Foundation. Archived from the original on 7 July 2014.
- Winarno, Ateng (14 August 1977). "Sjuman: Kepahitan Masa Kecil Terbawa Dalam Karya-karyanya" [Sjuman: The Bitterness of His Youth Shows in His Films] (PDF). Suara Karya. Archived from the original (PDF) on 4 March 2016.
- W.S., Titiek (July 1985). "Indonesia Kehilangan Seorang Pengabdi Seni: In Memoriam Syumanjaya" [Indonesia Has Lost a Man Dedicated to the Arts: In Memoriam Syumanjaya] (PDF). Sinematek Indonesia. Archived from the original (PDF) on 11 February 2012.
