= Sukarno M. Noor =

Indonesian actor, film producer

Soekarno M. Noer
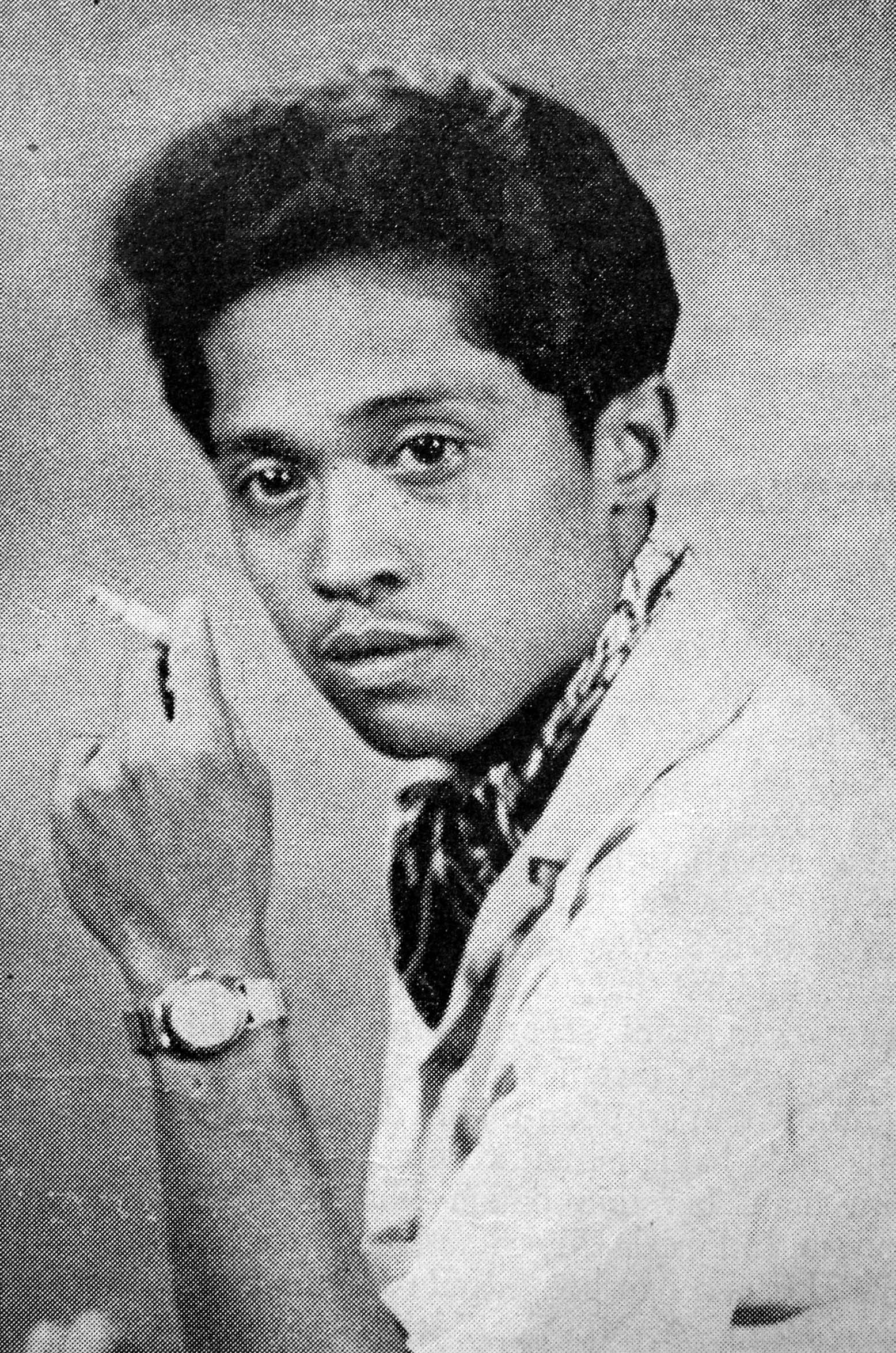
- Sukarno M. Noor in 1954
- Born: 13 September 1931; Batavia, Dutch East Indies
- Died: 26 July 1986 (aged 54); Jakarta, Indonesia
- Occupations: Actor, film producer
- Children: 6, including Rano Karno

Soekarno M. Noor (EYD: Sukarno M. Noor; 13 September 1931 – 26 July 1986) was an Indonesian actor and film producer. He acted in 118 films and dramas.

== Biography ==
His parents, M. Noer and Djanimah, came from Bonjol, West Sumatra. In 1953, he started his career in theater with the work Runtuhan. He was chosen best actor at the Indonesian Film Festival for his roles Anakku Sajang (1960), Dibalik Tjahaja Gemerlapan (1967), and Kemelut Hidup (1979). In 1970, he founded PT Kartika Binaprama but produced only one title, Honey Money and Djakarta Fair. In 1974, he was selected as chairman of the Association of Indonesian Film Artists (Parfi).

He was married to Lily Istiarti Sukarno and they had six children. Three of the six children followed in his footsteps and became actors: Rano Karno, Suti Karno and Tino Karno. He and his children founded Karno's Film which launched Si Doel Anak Sekolahan.

== Filmography ==
- Sri Asih (1954)
- Tjorak Dunia (1955)
- Sri Kustinah (1956)
- Air Mata Ibu (1957)
- Tjambuk Api (1958)
- Korban Fitnah (1959)
- Istana yang Hilang (1960)
- Pagar Kawat Berduri (1961)
- Anak-anak Revolusi (1964)
- Liburan Seniman (1965)
- Jampang Mencari Naga Hitam (1969)
- Si Gondrong (1970)
- Lewat Tengah Malam (1971)
- Mama (1972)
- Lingkaran Setan (1973)
- Senyum Di Pagi Bulan Desember (1974)
- Tengkorak Hitam (1978)
- Oma Irama Santai (1979)
