= Salah Asuhan =

1928 novel by Abdul Muis

- Author: Abdul Muis
- Language: Indonesian
- Genre: Novel
- Publisher: Balai Pustaka
- Publication date: 1928
- Publication place: Indonesia
- Media type: Print (Hardback & Paperback)
- Pages: 273 (39th printing)
- ISBN: 979-407-064-5 (39th printing)
- Preceded by: None
- Followed by: Pertemuan Jodoh

Salah Asuhan (Indonesian: Wrong Upbringing) is an Indonesian novel by Abdul Muis originally published in 1928 by Balai Pustaka. It is widely considered one of the best examples of early modern Indonesian literature.

== Background ==
Salah Asuhan was written during the colonial period and published by Balai Pustaka, which published books "suitable for native Indonesian reading." In order to be published, books had to avoid themes of rebellion and use formal Malay. As such, Salah Asuhan had to be rewritten with the European characters shown in a positive light after Balai Pustaka refused to publish it.

== Plot ==
The story revolves around the Minangkabau Hanafi and his friend, the half-French half-Minangkabau Corrie du Bussée. Although Hanafi is Minangkabau and a Muslim, he considers European culture to be superior and has many European friends. After graduating from high school in Solok, Hanafi admits his love to Corrie and kisses her. However, Corrie feels ashamed afterwards and eventually flees to Batavia (Jakarta), leaving a letter for Hanafi saying that they can never be together because he is pribumi. Hanafi is then married to his cousin Rapiah, much to his discontent. He begins taking out his anger on his family, especially Rapiah.

After a few years, Hanafi's European friends have left him because of his treatment of his family, including his and Rapiah's baby son. His temperament becomes worse as a result. One day, he is bitten by a rabid dog. He is sent for treatment in Batavia.

Upon arrival in Batavia, Hanafi meets Corrie again and they fall in love. They eventually marry and move in together. Hanafi finds employment with the Dutch colonial government, receives the same legal status as a European, and adopts the Christian name Chrisye. He does not think of his family in Solok, even though they are worried about him.

Although their married life starts well, eventually Hanafi becomes abusive towards Corrie. Upon hearing that Corrie has befriended a disreputable woman and occasionally meets other men without him knowing, Hanafi loses his temper, accuses Corrie of infidelity and hits her. Corrie runs away from home and eventually starts working at an orphanage in Semarang.

Hanafi's coworkers in Batavia ostracise him after hearing of his treatment of Corrie. After one tells him that he is seen to be acting poorly, Hanafi realizes that he was wrong and goes to Semarang to apologize to Corrie. However, upon arrival he finds her dying of cholera. Corrie forgives him, and dies. Hanafi then collapses from the stress.

After being treated, Hanafi returns to his village to be with his family. Not long after his arrival, he commits suicide by drinking poison and apologizes to his family on his deathbed, embracing his Minangkabau and Muslim heritage. Rapiah states that she will not raise their son to be like the Europeans.

== Themes ==
Salah Asuhan is generally seen as a warning against excessive Westernization. The failure of the marriage between Hanafi and Corrie is presented as being caused by Hanafi's refusal to follow Minangkabau traditions and aspiring to be more than a pribumi. Hanafi's admiration for European culture and lack of understanding of his own causes him to berate and demean his family, while his inability to live up to those ideals ultimately causes his relationship with Corrie to dissolve.

== Reception ==
Salah Asuhan is generally considered one of the most important works in modern Indonesian Literature and is commonly used as reading material in Indonesian literature classes.

Bakri Siregar wrote positively of Salah Asuhan, considering the diction unparalleled in its contemporaries and the characters well fleshed-out.

A. Teeuw considered Salah Asuhan one of the three most important pre-war novels. He wrote that the unprecedented frank depiction of racism and social ostracism was tempered by the simple writing style to the point that it could be enjoyed not only as a piece of literature, but also as a love story.

== In popular culture ==
Salah Asuhan was made into a film of the same name in 1972 by Asrul Sani.
