= Satan's Slave (1980 film) =

1980 Indonesian horror film

Pengabdi Setan
- Indonesian poster
- Directed by: Sisworo Gautama Putra
- Screenplay by: Imam Tantowi; Naryono Prayitno; Sisworo Gautama Putra
- Story by: Subagio S.
- Produced by: Subagio S.; Sabirin Kasdani; Gope T. Samtani
- Starring: W.D. Mochtar; Siska Widowati; Fachrul Rozy; Simon Cader; HIM Damsyik; Ruth Pelupessy
- Production company: Rapi Films
- Distributed by: Brentwood Home Video (U.S.)
- Release date: December 31, 1980 (Indonesia)
- Running time: 96 minutes
- Country: Indonesia
- Language: Indonesian

Satan's Slave (Indonesian: Pengabdi Setan) is a 1980 Indonesian supernatural horror film directed by Sisworo Gautama Putra. The film stars W.D. Mochtar, Siska Widowati, Fachrul Rozy, Simon Cader with HIM Damsyik and Ruth Pelupessy. The plot follows a wealthy family who are tormented by the undead after their mother dies. It has achieved cult status among fans of Asian horror films, principally because it has been unavailable for many years, except as an obscure Japanese VHS pressing with no English subtitles. In 2006, Brentwood Home Video, a specialist US label, released an uncut print on DVD for retail release as part of its Eastern Horror series. Among Western fans, it is notable for being one of the few classic horror films to substitute Christian beliefs for Muslim beliefs.

A remake, directed by Joko Anwar, was released on September 28, 2017, and it was a box office success met with mainstream critical acclaim.

== Plot ==
Mawarti, a mother who dies from a mysterious illness, leaves behind her workaholic husband, Munarto; her quiet and introverted son, Tomi; her party-going and extroverted daughter, Rita; and their sickly but religious servant, Mr. Karto. On the first night after Mawarti's death, Tomi sees a vision of his late mother, but does not speak to her. The next day, Tomi follows the advice of his friend and visits a fortune teller, who warns him that his entire family is in grave danger and may die. The fortune teller also advises him to protect himself with black magic.

Tomi becomes strange and withdrawn from his family. Rita's boyfriend, Herman, explains that for 40 days after a person dies, that person's spirit lingers in the house. Shortly after Herman’s visit, a new housekeeper named Darminah arrives, allegedly sent by an acquaintance of their father to look after the house. That night, after attending a party, Rita is terrified when she sees a woman in white, who claims to be her late mother.

Herman warns that Darminah is not to be trusted and offers to consult a shaman about the situation the following day. Mr. Karto also begins to notice her strange and suspicious behaviour. Tomi meets a kyai at a bookshop, who advises him to begin performing his religious prayers, but when he attempts to do so, his late mother's ghost appears and commands him to stop. The next day, Tomi discovers Mr. Karto's corpse hanging. Later that day, Herman is also killed when he is run over by a lorry after nearly colliding with the mysterious Darminah. That night, Tomi and Rita agree that the ghosts in their home must be banished. When Rita leaves, she is chased by the now-undead Herman. The next morning, Rita and Tomi tell their father to summon a shaman, which he does. Upon arriving, the shaman is attacked by broken glass and flower petals. Rita, Tomi, and Munarto watch in horror as the shaman is impaled through the head and pelted by a spinning chandelier.

After everything is over, Darminah sneaks out, but Tomi follows her to the cemetery, where the sinister housekeeper meets with the now-undead Herman and Mr. Karto before raising Mawarti from the grave and ordering her to kill her family. When they notice Tomi spying on them, they give chase, but he escapes. At home, Tomi immediately warns his father and sister about Darminah. Rita believes him, but their father dismisses the warning. He takes them to inspect Darminah's room, but she is somehow already there.

The next day, the siblings dig up their mother's grave to confirm that her body is still there. When they return home, the entire family is assaulted by the undead: Herman pursues Rita, Mr. Karto haunts Tomi, and Mawarti terrorises Munarto. They escape into the dining room, only to find Darminah there holding a skull and a mass of frizzy hair. It is revealed that Darminah is a demon who preys on those with weak Islamic faith. After being terrorised and dying without repentance, such people become slaves to the devil in hell.

The family runs to the front door and opens it in an attempt to flee, only to discover the kyai and his followers there to help. Together, they confront Darminah and the three zombies with verses from the Qur'an, which set them ablaze and drag them to hell for eternal punishment. The film ends with Munarto, Tomi, and Rita, all newly reconverted to Islam, returning from the mosque to their car. The camera then reveals that the woman in the car beside them is Darminah.

== Cast ==
- W.D. Mochtar as Munarto
- Siska Widowati as Rita
- Fachrul Rozy as Tomi
- HIM Damsyik as Pak Karto
- Ruth Pelupessy as Darminah
- Diana Suarkom as Mawarti
- Simon Cader as Herman
- Doddy Sukma as Pak Kiai
