= Kabut Sutra Ungu =

- Poster
- Directed by: Sjumandjaja
- Written by: Sjumandjaja
- Based on: Kabut Sutra Ungu by Ike Soepomo
- Produced by: Sjumandjaja
- Starring: Jenny Rachman; Roy Marten
- Cinematography: Leo Fioole
- Edited by: Janis Badar
- Music by: Sudharnoto
- Production company: Matari Artis Jaya Film
- Release date: 1979
- Running time: 127 minutes
- Country: Indonesia
- Language: Indonesian

Kabut Sutra Ungu (literally Mist of Purple Silk) is a 1979 Indonesian film directed by Sjumandjaja and starring Jenny Rachman, Roy Marten, and El Manik. Adopted from the novel of the same name by Ike Soepomo, it follows a young widow who must overcome various obstacles before marrying again.

== Plot ==
Miranti (Jenny Rachman) is left a widow after her pilot husband dies in an accident. She forces herself to work independently, despite feeling alienated. She soon learns that her brother-in-law Dimas (Roy Marten) cares greatly for her. Miranti ultimately realises that his feelings are more than just pity, and the two can unite.

== Production ==
Kabut Sutra Ungu was produced and directed by Sjumandjaja. It was his first film in over a year, following Yang Muda Yang Bercinta (The Young Fall in Love; 1978); the film's extended issues with the Indonesian censorship bureau, as well as his own poor health, had led Sjumandjaja to take a hiatus.

Sjumandjaja adapted the screenplay from the novel of the same name by Ike Soepomo, who had recently made her debut. Although he had previously heard his friends praise the novel, he first read it when an attendant on a train offered him a selection of books as reading material. Ultimately Sjumandjaja put a planned film on the Wali Songo on hold and began an adaptation. Production began in October 1979.

The film, made for Matari Artis Jaya Film, saw Leo Fioole on camera and Berthy I Lindia as artistic director. In post-production Sudharnoto handled music while Suparman Sidik did sound. The film was edited by Janis Badar.

The film starred Jenny Rachman and Roy Marten, with other roles handled by actors including El Manik, Sys NS, Ami Priyono, Farouk Afero, and Chitra Dewi. Rachman, then rising in popularity, refused several offers so that she could take a role in Kabut Sutra Ungu.

== Release and reception ==
Kabut Sutra Ungu was released in 1979. It proved the year's most popular Indonesian film, seeing almost half a million viewers in Jakarta. A review in Berita Yudha found the film to be well done, despite having extensive dialogue and Westernised symbolism. The reviewer considered the film to express the concerns faced by widows in Indonesia at the time.

== Awards ==
Kabut Sutra Ungu was nominated for seven Citra Awards at the 1980 Indonesian Film Festival, winning four; the festival also gave the film a special award as for showing a psychological change in society. Two of the awards it lost – Best Director and Best Screenplay – went to Frank Rorimpandey's Perawan Desa, while Best Supporting Actor went to Hassan Sanusi of Rembulan dan Matahari. Kabut Sutra Ungu also received an award for Best Actress at that year's Asia Pacific Film Festival. In 1981 it won the Antemas Award for being the best-selling film of the preceding year.

Award	Year	Category	Recipient	Result
Indonesian Film Festival	1980	Best Director	Sjumandjaja	Nominated
Indonesian Film Festival	1980	Best Screenplay	Sjumandjaja	2nd place
Indonesian Film Festival	1980	Best Leading Actress	Jenny Rachman	Won
Indonesian Film Festival	1980	Best Supporting Actor	El Hakim	Nominated
Indonesian Film Festival	1980	Best Cinematography	Leo Fioole	Won
Indonesian Film Festival	1980	Best Sound Editing	Norman Benny	Won
Indonesian Film Festival	1980	Best Musical Direction	Sudharnoto	Won
Asia Pacific Film Festival	1980	Best Leading Actress	Jenny Rachman	Won
Indonesian Film Festival	1981	Best-Selling Film	–	Won

== Works cited ==
- Chan, Anis (1979). "Sumanjaya Aktip Kembali" [Sumanjaya Active Again]. Vista (in Indonesian). X (475): 20–21.
- "Kabut Sutra Ungu". filmindonesia.or.id (in Indonesian). Jakarta: Konfidan Foundation. Archived from the original on 15 October 2013.
- "Ketersandungan Problematis Sumanjaya" [Sumanjaya's Problematic Stumble]. Berita Yudha Minggu (in Indonesian). 26 October 1980. pp. VI–VII.
- "Kredit Kabut Sutra Ungu" [Credits for Kabut Sutra Ungu]. filmindonesia.or.id (in Indonesian). Jakarta: Konfidan Foundation. Archived from the original on 7 March 2016.
- "Penghargaan Kabut Sutra Ungu" [Awards for Kabut Sutra Ungu]. filmindonesia.or.id (in Indonesian). Jakarta: Konfidan Foundation. Archived from the original on 5 March 2016.
- "Penghargaan Perawan Desa" [Awards for Perawan Desa]. filmindonesia.or.id (in Indonesian). Jakarta: Konfidan Foundation. Archived from the original on 4 March 2016.
- "Rembulan dan Matahari" [Awards for Rembulan dan Matahari]. filmindonesia.or.id (in Indonesian). Jakarta: Konfidan Foundation. Archived from the original on 30 June 2017.
