= Abdul Muis =

Indonesian journalist and national hero

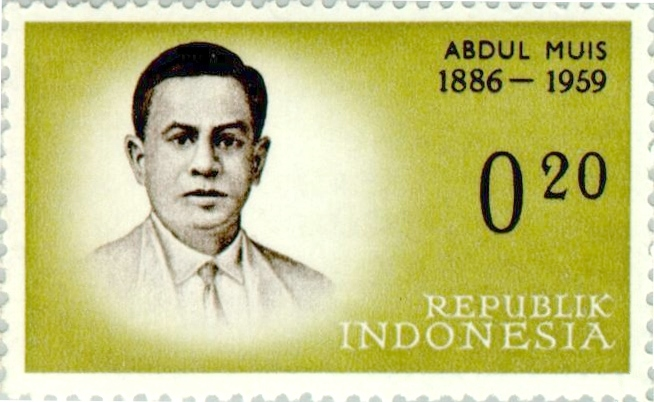
- Born: 3 July 1886; Sungai Puar, Agam, Dutch East Indies
- Died: 1959 (aged 72); Bandung, West Java, Indonesia
- Writing career
- Genre: Fiction
- Notable works: Salah Asuhan; Pertemuan Jodoh

Abdul Muis (also spelt Abdoel Moeis; 1886–1959), was an Indonesian writer, journalist and nationalist. He advocated for Indonesia's independence from the Netherlands. He was the first person to be named an Indonesian national hero.

== Biography ==
Born in Sungai Puar in 1886 to a leading member of the Minangkabau, Muis received a western education and studied medicine in Jakarta for three years before being forced to pull out due to ill health.

Muis first found employment in the civil service, as a clerk at the Department of Education, but was discriminated by his Dutch colleagues, leaving in 1905, switching to journalism and becoming involved in nationalist publications such as Kaoem Moeda, a paper he co-founded in 1912. He became known for his inflammatory articles, which were highly critical of Dutch involvement in Indonesia. For example, essays published in De Express, a Dutch-language newspaper, were highly critical of Dutch attitudes towards Indonesians. During the First World War he was active in the movement for greater autonomy for the Indies, and was a member of a delegation of the Comité Indië Weerbaar (Committee for the Defence of the Indies).

Around the same time he joined the Sarekat Islam (Islamic Union), becoming an active member of the organization, and was rapidly promoted through the ranks, becoming its representative to the Netherlands in negotiations aimed at obtaining direct representation for Indonesia in the Dutch parliamentary system. In 1920 he was appointed a member of the Volksraad (Peoples Council), which later developed into a semi-legislative assembly.

Muis ran into trouble with the Dutch administration a number of times. He was arrested in 1919 following the murder of a Dutch Controleur in North Sulawesi just after Muis had completed a speaking tour there. Not long after, in 1922, he led a protest strike in Yogyakarta, and was arrested and confined to the city of Garut, in West Java for three years.

From the late 1920s Muis shifted his focus from politics to creative writing, and in 1927 he initiated correspondence with the state-owned publishing house Balai Pustaka. In his first novel, Salah Asuhan (Wrong Upbringing), published in 1928, Muis depicted the problem of racial and social discrimination in the tragic story of Hanafi and Corrie. The Western-oriented Hanafi and the feisty, liberal Corrie represent the conflict pre-independent Indonesia faced in choosing either to adhere to traditional values, or to adopt Western notions of modernity. The novel was one of the most famous of his works as well as among the most popular works of modern Indonesian fiction. The novel was one of several Indonesian classics to be included in the Indonesian Cultural Heritage Series published by Balai Pustaka in 2009. and, in 2010, an English translation (Never the Twain) was also published by the Lontar Foundation as part of the Foundation's Modern Indonesia Series. Muis also published three other major novels, among them Pertemuan Jodoh (The Destined Marriage Partners), published in 1932, and four novels in Indonesian translation.

He spent the latter part of his life in Bandung, and was involved in the establishment of the Bandung Institute of Technology. After Independence he founded Persatuan Perjuangan Priangan, the focus of which was the development of West Java and the Sundanese.

Muis died in Bandung in 1959, and is today seen as an important freedom fighter in Indonesia's history. In 1959, in recognition of his dedication to the nationalist cause he was named a national hero by President Sukarno.

== Selected novels ==
- Salah Asuhan (A Wrong Upbringing), Jakarta : Balai Pustaka, 1928
- Pertemuan Jodoh (The Destined Marriage Partners), Jakarta : Balai Pustaka, 1932
- Surapati, Jakarta : Balai Pustaka, 1950
- Hendak Berbakti, Jakarta, 1951
- Robert Anak Surapati, Jakarta : Balai Pustaka, 1953
