= Sjumandjaja =

Indonesian actor and filmmaker

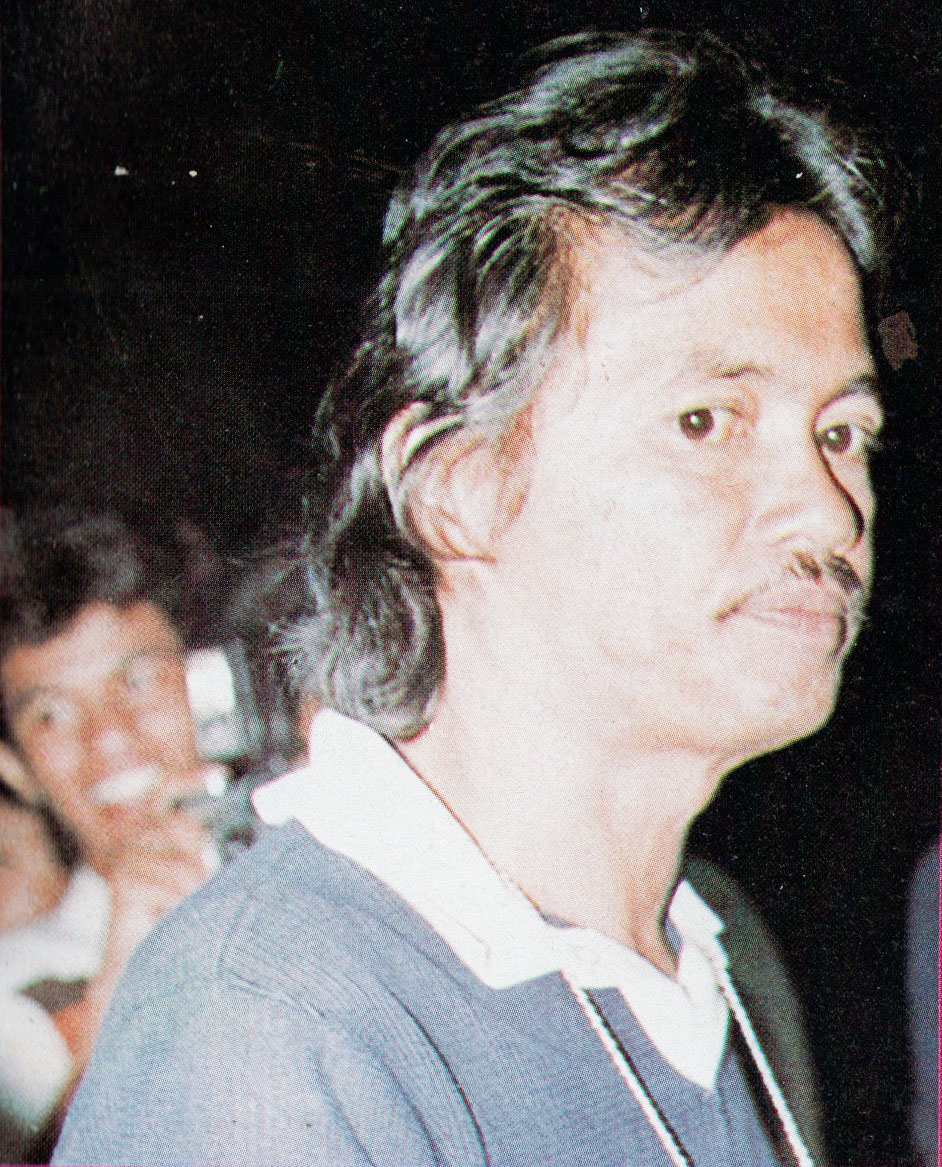
- Sjumandjaja at the 1982 Indonesian Film Festival
- Born: 5 August 1933; Batavia, Dutch East Indies (now Indonesia)
- Died: 19 July 1985 (aged 51); Jakarta, Indonesia
- Education: All-Union State Institute of Cinematography
- Occupations: Director, screenwriter, actor
- Years active: 1956–1985
- Notable work: Pengantin Remadja; Si Doel Anak Betawi; Budak Nafsu
- Style: Social realism
- Awards: Five Citra Awards

Sjumandjaja (Perfected Spelling: Syumanjaya; 5 August 1933 (Note: He reportedly liked telling people that he was born in 1933, but used 1934 in official records. (Ardan 1985, pp. 123–124).) – 19 July 1985) was an Indonesian director, screenwriter, and actor. During his career he wrote numerous films, directed fourteen, acted in ten, and produced nine; he also won five Citra Awards from the Indonesian Film Festival. His films reflected social realism.

Sjumandjaja was born in Batavia (modern day Jakarta), Dutch East Indies, and grew up there. During high school, he became interested in creative writing and acting, eventually joining the Senen Artists' Group. In 1956, when one of his short stories was adapted into a film, Sjumandjaja became active in the filmmaking industry, writing two films for the production company Persari. After receiving a government scholarship, he moved to Moscow and attended the All-Union State Institute of Cinematography. Upon returning to Indonesia in 1965, Sjumandjaja took a job at the Ministry of Information and continued writing screenplays. In 1971, after leaving the ministry, he directed his first feature film, Lewat Tengah Malam (Past Midnight). He continued to write and direct films until his death from a heart attack on 19 July 1985.

Reportedly a strict director, Sjumandjaja valued creative value over receiving a director's fee. He married three times and had three children, two with his first wife and one with his second. His son, Sri Aksana, is the former drummer of Dewa 19, and his daughter Djenar Maesa Ayu is also a Citra Award-winning director.

== Biography ==
=== Early life ===
Sjumandjaja was born in Batavia on 5 August 1934. The fifth of eight children, Sjumandjaja was ethnically Javanese but soon became accustomed to the local Betawi culture. He studied Quran reading for a period of three days, but stopped after numerous disagreements with the teacher. When he was ten years old, his father died, leaving Sjumandjaja to be raised by his mother. During the Japanese occupation of the Dutch East Indies from 1942 to 1945, he witnessed several forced labourers being beaten to death near his home during the construction of Kemayoran Airport.

While attending high school at Taman Siswa, Sjumandjaja became interested in drama. Together with his schoolmates S. M. Ardan and Savitri (daughter of dramatist Sanusi Pane), he put on a production of Utuy Tatang Sontani's play "Awal dan Mira" ("Awal and Mira"); another schoolmate, Misbach Yusa Biran, directed. During this period, Sjumandjaja was also a member of the Senen Artists' Group, named after its meeting place in Senen, together with his former classmates and several others such as future Minister of Information Harmoko. With the group he wrote short stories, poems, and works of literary criticism.

In 1956, Sjumandjaja played a role in Terang Bulan Terang di Tengah Kali (Moon Shining Light in the Middle of the Stream), written by Ardan and directed by Wim Umboh. That same year, his short story "Kerontjong Kemajoran" ("Keroncong from Kemayoran") was adapted into a film by the production company Persari under the title Saodah. The following year, another of Sjumandjaja's short stories, "Anakku Sajang" ("My Dear Child") was adapted by the company; he took on the role of assistant director for the film. Sjumandjaja became an employee of Persari in 1958, under the leadership of Asrul Sani.

In 1959, Sjumandjaja received a government scholarship to study in Moscow. After a one-year-long preparatory course, in 1960 he enrolled at the All-Union State Institute of Cinematography; he was the first Indonesian student to attend the institute. A womanizer on campus, he graduated summa cum laude from the institute in 1964 or 1965. His submission, Bajangan (Shadows), a film based on a story by Erskine Caldwell, was a 25-minute-long black-and-white profile of a woman waiting for her grandson. He was only the seventh person to graduate summa cum laude from the institution, and the first foreigner.

=== Film career ===
After returning to Indonesia in 1965, Sjumandjaja worked at the Ministry of Information; from 1966 to 1968 he was the head of the film directorate and succeeded in passing a bill which used the profits from film imports to fund local productions. He later continued directing and screenwriting while taking a five-year term as the head of the Jakarta Art Bureau. His 1971 feature film debut, Lewat Tengah Malam (Past Midnight), produced by Allied Film Indonesia, brought him under close supervision by the Suharto-led government for its social critique, while Pengantin Remadja (Teenage Newlyweds), which he wrote, won an award at the 1971 Asian Film Festival. This was followed by Flambojan (Flamboyant; 1972).

In 1972, Sjumandjaja founded his production company Matari Film; the company's first film, Si Doel Anak Betawi (Doel the Betawi Child), which he directed, was critically acclaimed and led to a surge in popularity for both Betawi culture and the film's star Rano Karno. Two of his later films, Si Mamad (The One Called Mamad; 1974) and Pinangan (A Proposal; 1976), were based on the works of Anton Chekov, while the 1975 film Laila Majenun (Laila is Possessed) was an adaptation of West Side Story. After filming Yang Muda Yang Bercinta (The Young Fall in Love), which was delayed by the censorship board, in 1977, he took another hiatus to deal with health issues. During this period he became a more devout Muslim.

On 25 December 1978, Sjumandjaja announced his return with a new film, Kabut Sutra Ungu (Mist of Purple Silk), an adaptation of the novel by Ike Soepomo. Kabut Sutra Ungu was followed by several more films, including Bukan Sandiwara (Not a Play; 1980), the biopic of female emancipation figure Kartini R. A. Kartini (1981), and Budak Nafsu (Slave to Lust; 1983), which was based on the novel Fatimah by Titie Said. Sjumandjaja's last film before his death, Kerikil-Kerikil Tajam (Sharp Pebbles) was released in 1984.

After suffering from a heart attack during prayer at Soepomo's home on 19 July 1985, Sjumandjaja was brought to Dr. Cipto Mangunkusumo Hospital in Jakarta. He died at 3:50 p.m. local time (UTC+7) and was buried the following day at Kawi-Kawi Public Cemetery. He left behind a nearly finished film, Jakarta Opera, which had been exerting himself heavily to complete. It was later completed by Sutomo Gandasubrata.

== Directing style ==
Sjumandjaja was reportedly a very strict director and unwilling to receive criticism from actors. According to El Manik, who played a Japanese soldier in Budak Nafsu, Sjumandjaja refused to listen to El Manik's concern that a Japanese man would not be able to speak Indonesian fluently, instead telling the actor to write Japanese dialog himself if he wanted. Gandasubrata recalled that Sjumandjaja fired his own father-in-law from Jakarta Opera when the latter could not perform to the director's expectations. According to producer Manoo Sukmajaya, Sjumandjaja would refuse to accept a directing offer if he found the script uninteresting, valuing creative worth over the director's fee.

Sjumandjaja was influenced by numerous Russian works, which he had seen while in the Soviet Union. These works included Mikhail Kalatozov's Letyat Zhuravli (The Cranes Are Flying; 1957), Grigori Chukhrai's Sorok Pervyy (The Forty-First; 1956), and Ballada o Soldate (Ballad of a Soldier; 1959). The romanticism in these post-Stalinist works was reflected in Sjumandjaja's work up until Kerikil-Kerikil Tajam. His works have also been classified as social realism, with films such as Si Mamad and Atheis reflecting issues relevant to modern society. Several of his films, such as Yang Muda Yang Bercinta, contain themes of self-awareness and discovery, while Budak Nafsu contained what Marselli, writing in Kompas, described as a "vulgar eroticism". (Note: Original: "... erotisme yang vulgar.")

Technique-wise, Sjumandjaja used the camera to emphasise the narrative. Bajangan, his first work, used long shots to show the main character's lonesomeness. He would often use several shots to show the psychological issues faced by his characters, focusing on both the characters and the space around them. He also used references to well-known cultural works; a scene in Kartini was framed so to reflect Leonardo da Vinci's The Last Supper.

== Accolades ==
Sjumandjaja received five Citra Awards at the Indonesian Film Festival (FFI) for his works, namely Best Screenplay for Laila Majenun (FFI 1976), Best Director and Best Screenplay for Si Doel Anak Modern (FFI 1977), Best Director for Budak Nafsu (FFI 1984), and Best Screenplay for Kerikil-Kerikil Tajam (FFI 1985).

== Personal life ==
Sjumandjaja first marriage was to ballet dancer Farida Utoyo, whom he met and married while in the Soviet Union; Utoyo was studying at the Moscow State Academy of Choreography. With Utoyo he had two sons, Aridya Yudistira and Sri Aksana (former drummer of Dewa 19). The couple's separation in the early 1970s served as his inspiration for Flambojan (Flamboyant; 1972). After divorcing Utoyo, Sjumandjaja married actress Tuti Kirana before the release of Si Doel Anak Betawi. In 1973 the couple had a daughter, Djenar Maesa Ayu, who later became a writer-cum-director and won a Citra Award for her debut film Mereka Bilang, Saya Monyet! (They Say I'm a Monkey!; 2007). In 1982 his relationship with Kirana soured, and the couple divorced. In 1984 he married a third wife, Zoraya Perucha.

Sjumandjaja was known as a heavy drinker, which contributed to his health issues. Starting with beer while in high school, he later switched to hard liquor despite suffering from liver issues while still in his teens. Towards the end of his life, when he became more religious, he drank less.

== Filmography ==
=== Actor ===
- Terang Bulan di Tengah Hari (Moon Shining at Noon; 1956)
- Jang Djatuh di Kaki Laki-Laki (That Which Falls at a Boy's Feet; 1971)
- Perawan Buta (Blind Virgin; 1971)
- Lorong Hitam (Dark Alley; 1972)
- Si Bongkok (The Hunchback; 1972)
- Mama (1972)
- Andjing-Andjing Geladak (The Dogs on the Deck; 1972)
- Flambojan (Flamboyant; 1972)
- Ganasnya Nafsu (Lust's Ferocity; 1976)
- Ombaknya Laut Mabuknya Cinta (The Waves of the Sea, the Intoxication of Love; 1978)

=== Director ===
- Bajangan (Shadows; 1965)
- Lewat Tengah Malam (Past Midnight; 1971)
- Flambojan (Flamboyant; 1972)
- Si Doel Anak Betawi (Doel the Betawi Child; 1972)
- Si Mamad (The One Named Mamad; 1973)
- Atheis (Atheist; 1974; also known as Kafir)
- Laila Majenun (Laila is Possessed; 1975)
- Si Doel Anak Modern (Doel the Modern Child; 1976)
- Pinangan (A Proposal; 1976)
- Yang Muda Yang Bercinta (The Young Fall in Love; 1977)
- Kabut Sutra Ungu (Mist of Purple Silk; 1980)
- Bukan Sandiwara (Not a Play; 1980)
- R.A. Kartini (1982)
- Budak Nafsu (Slave to Lust; 1983)
- Kerikil-Kerikil Tajam (Sharp Pebbles; 1984)
- Opera Jakarta (1985)

=== Writer ===
- Saodah (1956)
- Anakku Sajang (My Dear Child; 1957)
- Nji Ronggeng (1969)
- Kekasihku Ibuku (My Mother, My Love; 1971)
- Pengantin Remadja (Teenage Newlyweds; 1971)
- Lewat Tengah Malam (Past Midnight; 1971)
- Jang Djatuh di Kaki Laki-Laki (That Which Falls at a Boy's Feet; 1971)
- Beranak dalam Kubur (Giving Birth in the Grave; 1971)
- Lorong Hitam (Dark Alley; 1972)
- Si Bongkok (The Hunchback; 1972)
- Mama (1972)
- Andjing-Andjing Geladak (The Dogs on the Deck; 1972)
- Si Doel Anak Betawi (Doel the Betawi Child; 1972)
- Jimat Benyamin (Benyamin's Amulet; 1973)
- Si Mamad (The One Named Mamad; 1973)
- Atheis (Atheist; 1974; also known as Kafir)
- Cinta Remaja (Teenage Love; 1974)
- Prahara (Tempest; 1974)
- Laila Majenun (Laila is Possessed; 1975)
- Si Doel Anak Modern (Doel the Modern Child; 1976)
- Pinangan (A Proposal; 1976)
- Wajah Tiga Perempuan (Faces of Three Women; 1976)
- Gitar Tua Oma Irama (Oma Irama's Old Guitar; 1977)
- Yoan (1977)
- Siulan Rahasia (Secret Whistle; 1977)
- Arwah Komersial dalam Kampus (Commercial Spirit on Campus; 1977)
- Darah Muda (Young Blood; 1977)
- Ombaknya Laut Mabuknya Cinta (The Waves of the Sea, the Intoxication of Love; 1978)
- Kabut Sutra Ungu (Mist of Purple Silk; 1980)
- Selamat Tinggal Duka (Goodbye Grief; 1980)
- Permainan Bulan December (A Game in December; 1980)
- Yang Kembali Bersemi (That Which Flourishes Again; 1980)
- Gadis Maraton (Marathon Girl; 1981)
- R.A. Kartini (1982)
- Kerikil-Kerikil Tajam (Sharp Pebbles; 1984)
- Yang Masih di Bawah Umur (Those Still Underage; 1985)

=== Producer ===
- Si Mamad (The One Named Mamad; 1973)
- Bulan di Atas Kuburan (Moon over the Grave; 1973)
- Atheis (Atheist; 1974; also known as Kafir)
- Laila Majenun (Laila is Possessed; 1975)
- Pinangan (A Proposal; 1976)
- Yang Muda Yang Bercinta (The Young Fall in Love; 1977)
- Ombaknya Laut Mabuknya Cinta (The Waves of the Sea, the Intoxication of Love; 1978)
- Kabut Sutra Ungu (Mist of Purple Silk; 1980)
- Selamat Tinggal Duka (Goodbye Grief; 1980)
