= Mickey Gilley discography =

- Studio albums: 28
- Live albums: 2
- Compilation albums: 13
- Singles: 54
- Music videos: 5
- No. 1 Single: 20

Mickey Gilley was an American country music artist. His discography consists of 28 studio albums, 13 compilation albums, two live albums, 54 singles, and five music videos. 46 of his singles charted on the Billboard Hot Country Songs chart between 1968 and 1989, including 17 number one hits.

== Studio albums ==
=== 1960s and 1970s ===
| Title | Details | Peak positions | |
| Title | Details | US Country | AUS |
|---|---|---|---|
| Lonely Wine | Release date: 1964; Label: Astro | — | — |
| Room Full of Roses | Release date: 1974; Label: Playboy | 1 | 55 |
| City Lights | Release date: 1975; Label: Playboy | 1 | — |
| Mickey's Movin' On | Release date: 1975; Label: Playboy | 9 | — |
| Overnight Sensation | Release date: 1975; Label: Playboy | 4 | — |
| Gilley's Smokin' | Release date: 1976; Label: Playboy | 4 | — |
| First Class | Release date: 1977; Label: Playboy | 5 | — |
| Flyin' High | Release date: 1978; Label: Playboy | 44 | — |
| Why Me, Lord | Release date: 1978; Label: Astro | — | — |
| The Songs We Made Love To | Release date: 1979; Label: Playboy / Epic | 49 | — |
| Mickey Gilley | Release date: 1979; Label: Playboy / Epic | — | — |
"—" denotes releases that did not chart

=== 1980s–2010s ===
| Title | Details | Peak positions | | |
| Title | Details | US Country | US | CAN Country |
|---|---|---|---|---|
| That's All That Matters to Me | Release date: 1980; Label: Epic | 8 | 177 | — |
| You Don't Know Me | Release date: 1981; Label: Epic | 19 | 170 | — |
| Christmas at Gilley's | Release date: 1981; Label: Epic | 34 | — | — |
| Put Your Dreams Away | Release date: November 29, 1982; Label: Epic | 10 | — | — |
| Fool for Your Love | Release date: 1983; Label: Epic | 20 | — | — |
| You Really Got a Hold on Me | Release date: 1983; Label: Epic | 24 | — | — |
| It Takes Believers (with Charly McClain) | Release date: 1984; Label: Epic | 7 | — | 10 |
| Too Good to Stop Now | Release date: 1984; Label: Epic | 34 | — | — |
| I Feel Good (About Lovin' You) | Release date: 1985; Label: Epic | 40 | — | — |
| One and Only | Release date: 1986; Label: Epic | 40 | — | — |
| Chasing Rainbows | Release date: 1988; Label: Airborne | 52 | — | — |
| Make It Like the First Time | Release date: 1993; Label: Intersound | — | — | — |
| Talk to Me | Release date: 1994; Label: Intersound | — | — | — |
| Precious Memories | Release date: 1999; Label: Finer Arts | — | — | — |
| Invitation Only | Release date: May 20, 2003; Label: Varèse Sarabande | — | — | — |
| Kickin' It Down the Road | Release date: 2016; Label: Self-released | — | — | — |
| Two Old Cats (with Troy Payne) | Release date: May 8, 2018; Label: TAP Music | — | — | — |
"—" denotes releases that did not chart

== Compilation albums ==
| Title | Details | Peak positions | Certifications |
| Title | Details | US Country | Certifications |
|---|---|---|---|
| At His Best | Release date: 1974; Label: Paula | 49 | |
| Gilley's Greatest Hits Vol. 1 | Release date: 1976; Label: Playboy | 5 | |
| Greatest Hits, Vol. II | Release date: 1977; Label: Playboy | 30 | |
| At His Best Volume 2 | Release date: 1978; Label: Paula | — | |
| Encore | Release date: 1980; Label: Epic | 14 | US: Gold |
| Suburban Cowboy (Early Recordings) | Release date: 1981; Label: Accord | — | |
| All My Best | Release date: 1982; Label: CSP/CBS | — | |
| Biggest Hits | Release date: 1982; Label: Epic | 39 | US: Gold |
| Ten Years of Hits | Release date: 1984; Label: Epic | 56 | |
| Back to Basics | Release date: 1987; Label: Epic | 48 | |
| Super Hits | Release date: 1997; Label: Epic | — | |
| 16 Biggest Hits | Release date: March 11, 2003; Label: Epic/Legacy | — | |
| The Essential Mickey Gilley | Release date: January 9, 2015; Label: Epic/Legacy | — | |
"—" denotes releases that did not chart

== Live albums ==
| Title | Details | Peak positions |
| Title | Details | US Country |
|---|---|---|
| Live! At Gilley's | Release date: 1985; Label: Epic | 53 |
| Live from the Mickey Gilley Theatre | Release dat: 2005; Label: Madacy | — |
"—" denotes releases that did not chart

== Singles ==
=== 1950s–1970s ===
| Year | Single | Peak positions | | | | | | Album |
| Year | Single | US Country | US | US AC | CAN Country | CAN | AUS | Album |
|---|---|---|---|---|---|---|---|---|
| 1958 | "Call Me Shorty" | — | — | — | — | — | — | Non-album singles |
| 1960 | "Is It Wrong" | — | — | — | — | — | — | Non-album singles |
| 1963 | "I Ain't No Bo Diddley" | — | — | — | — | — | — | Non-album singles |
| 1963 | "Three's a Crowd" | — | — | — | — | — | — | Non-album singles |
| 1966 | "Say No to You" | — | — | — | — | — | — | Non-album singles |
| 1967 | "(I'm Gonna Put My) Love in the Want Ads" | — | — | — | — | — | — | Non-album singles |
| 1968 | "A New Way to Live" | — | — | — | — | — | — | Non-album singles |
| 1968 | "Now I Can Live Again" | 68 | — | — | — | — | — | Non-album singles |
| 1969 | "It's Just a Matter of Making Up My Mind" | — | — | — | — | — | — | Non-album singles |
| 1974 | "Room Full of Roses" | 1 | 50 | — | 6 | 57 | 9 | Room Full of Roses |
| 1974 | "I Overlooked an Orchid" | 1 | — | — | 15 | — | — | Room Full of Roses |
| 1974 | "City Lights" | 1 | — | — | 2 | — | — | City Lights |
| 1975 | "Window Up Above" | 1 | — | — | 1 | — | — | Mickey's Movin' On |
| 1975 | "Bouquet of Roses" | 11 | — | — | 16 | — | — | Overnight Sensation |
| 1975 | "Roll You Like a Wheel" (with Barbi Benton) | 32 | — | — | 19 | — | — | Non-album single |
| 1975 | "Overnight Sensation" | 7 | — | — | 4 | — | — | Overnight Sensation |
| 1976 | "Don't the Girls All Get Prettier at Closing Time" | 1 | — | — | 1 | — | — | Gilley's Smokin' |
| 1976 | "Bring It On Home to Me" | 1 | — (Note: "Bring It On Home to Me" did not enter the Hot 100, but peaked at number 1 on Bubbling Under Hot 100 Singles.) | 37 | 1 | — | — | Gilley's Smokin' |
| 1976 | "Lawdy Miss Clawdy" | 3 | — | — | 5 | — | — | Gilley's Smokin' |
| 1977 | "She's Pulling Me Back Again" | 1 | — | — | 1 | — | — | First Class |
| 1977 | "Honky Tonk Memories" | 4 | — | — | 2 | — | — | First Class |
| 1977 | "Chains of Love" | 9 | — | — | 7 | — | — | First Class |
| 1978 | "The Power of Positive Drinkin'" | 8 | — | — | 7 | — | — | Flyin' High |
| 1978 | "Here Comes the Hurt Again" | 9 | — | — | 43 | — | — | Flyin' High |
| 1978 | "The Song We Made Love To" | 13 | — | — | 26 | — | — | The Songs We Made Love To |
| 1979 | "Just Long Enough to Say Goodbye" | 10 | — | — | 10 | — | — | The Songs We Made Love To |
| 1979 | "My Silver Lining" | 8 | — | — | 62 | — | — | Mickey Gilley |
| 1979 | "A Little Gettin' Used To" | 17 | — | — | — | — | — | Mickey Gilley |
"—" denotes releases that did not chart

=== 1980s ===
| Year | Single | Peak positions | | | | | | Album |
| Year | Single | US Country | US | US AC | CAN Country | CAN | CAN AC | Album |
|---|---|---|---|---|---|---|---|---|
| 1980 | "True Love Ways" | 1 | 66 | 40 | 1 | — | — | That's All That Matters to Me |
| 1980 | "Stand by Me" | 1 | 22 | 3 | 3 | 51 | — | Urban Cowboy (soundtrack) |
| 1980 | "That's All That Matters" | 1 | — (Note: "That's All That Matters" did not enter the Hot 100, but peaked at number 1 on Bubbling Under Hot 100 Singles.) | — | 9 | — | — | That's All That Matters to Me |
| 1981 | "A Headache Tomorrow (Or a Heartache Tonight)" | 1 | — | — | 1 | — | — | That's All That Matters to Me |
| 1981 | "You Don't Know Me" | 1 | 55 | 12 | 1 | — | 6 | You Don't Know Me |
| 1981 | "Lonely Nights" | 1 | — | — | 1 | — | — | You Don't Know Me |
| 1982 | "Tears of the Lonely" | 3 | — | — | 1 | — | — | You Don't Know Me |
| 1982 | "Put Your Dreams Away" | 1 | — | — | 1 | — | — | Put Your Dreams Away |
| 1982 | "Talk to Me" | 1 | — (Note: "Talk to Me" did not enter the Hot 100, but peaked at number 6 on Bubbling Under Hot 100 Singles.) | — | 3 | — | — | Put Your Dreams Away |
| 1983 | "Fool for Your Love" | 1 | — | — | 1 | — | — | Fool for Your Love |
| 1983 | "Your Love Shines Through" | 5 | — | — | 6 | — | — | Fool for Your Love |
| 1983 | "You've Really Got a Hold on Me" | 2 | — | — | 1 | — | — | You've Really Got a Hold on Me |
| 1984 | "Candy Man" (with Charly McClain) | 5 | — | — | 3 | — | — | It Takes Believers |
| 1984 | "The Right Stuff" (with Charly McClain) | 14 | — | — | 7 | — | — | It Takes Believers |
| 1984 | "Too Good to Stop Now" | 4 | — | — | 1 | — | — | Too Good to Stop Now |
| 1985 | "I'm the One Mama Warned You About" | 10 | — | — | 10 | — | — | Too Good to Stop Now |
| 1985 | "You've Got Something on Your Mind" | 10 | — | — | 7 | — | — | I Feel Good (About Lovin' You) |
| 1985 | "Your Memory Ain't What It Used to Be" | 5 | — | — | 2 | — | — | I Feel Good (About Lovin' You) |
| 1986 | "Doo-Wah Days" | 6 | — | — | 9 | — | — | One and Only |
| 1987 | "Full Grown Fool" | 16 | — | — | 18 | — | — | Back to Basics |
| 1988 | "I'm Your Puppet" | 49 | — | — | — | — | — | Chasing Rainbows |
| 1988 | "She Reminded Me of You" | 23 | — | — | 10 | — | — | Chasing Rainbows |
| 1989 | "You've Still Got a Way with My Heart" | 62 | — | — | 87 | — | — | Chasing Rainbows |
| 1989 | "There! I've Said It Again" | 53 | — | — | 77 | — | — | Chasing Rainbows |
"—" denotes releases that did not chart

=== As featured artist ===
| Year | Single | Peak positions | | Album |
| Year | Single | US Country | CAN Country | Album |
|---|---|---|---|---|
| 1983 | "Paradise Tonight" (Charly McClain with Mickey Gilley) | 1 | 1 | Paradise |
| 1985 | "It Ain't Gonna Worry My Mind" (Ray Charles with Mickey Gilley) | 12 | 31 | Friendship |

== Music videos ==
| Year | Single | Director |
|---|---|---|
| 1982 | "Talk to Me" | —N/a |
| 1983 | "You've Really Got a Hold on Me" | —N/a |
| 1986 | "Doo-Wah Days" | Bob Radler |
| 1988 | "She Reminded Me of You" | Jim May, Mac Bennett |
| 1989 | "You've Still Got a Way with My Heart" | Jim May |
