= Indonesian comedy =

Indonesian comedic forms have evolved from folk drama to comedic films and television shows. The most popular form of modern stage comedy in Indonesia is comedy troupes doing skits or sketches. In the film industry and television, the most popular comedy in Indonesia today is stand up comedy, such as that performed by Stand Up Indo. Several TV networks air stand up comedy shows, including Kompas TV with its program Stand Up Comedy Indonesia (SUCI). After SUCI was introduced, other networks like Metro TV and Indosiar have likewise introduced comedy shows.

== History ==
At the beginning of the 20th century, pop comedy groups or comedies of nobility emerged in Indonesia. One of these, stambul comedy, is a form of Indonesian folk drama that incorporates Malay cultural influences in the stories told and the language used.

Although stambul comedy is no longer common, there are other forms of traditional Indonesian comedy which are both traditional and more common such as Ludruk, Lenong, Betawi masks. Non-traditional forms of humorous drama are also performed, such as the comedy of the Srimulat group, which depicts stories of everyday life.

Nowadays, comedy appears not only in plays but also in films. Some performers participate in comedy troupes making multiple films, such as Warkop DKI (Warung Kopi), comedy group Bagio Cs, and other comedy groups. In these films, the members of the comedy troupe often play leading roles. Indonesians also enjoy comedy produced elsewhere, such as that in the private television broadcast of RCTI and TVRI, which broadcasts such comedies as, such as Kate and Allie, My Two Dads, Golden Girls, all of which are popular in their home country, the United States. Other well-known stars include Charlie Chaplin, Jerry I Lewis, and Bill Cosby.

== Contemporary Indonesian comedy ==
=== Stage ===
The most popular form of stage comedy in Indonesia is comedy troupes doing skits or sketches, usually following a simple storyline and improvised by all actors. Performers engage in bantering, physical humour, cross-dressing, and socio-political commentary. Examples of popular comedy groups are Srimulat, Jayakarta, Kwartet Jaya, Bagito, Warkop DKI, Patrio, and SQL.

=== Television ===
In recent history, the programs with the highest rating in Indonesia have been comedy shows, especially those broadcasts during Eid Mubarak or other fasting periods. Situation comedy or sketch shows have been common on television since the 1990s. Gara-gara, which first aired on RCTI in 1992, is considered the first situation comedy in Indonesia. Critics attribute the success of this program to its translation of the comedic approach developed by Warkop DKI from film to television. Comedy is also presented in TV programs as part of talent search events. One example of this approach is Stand-Up Comedy Indonesia, a TV program that looks for talent to become comedians or entertainers in the Indonesian film industry.

=== Film ===
Successful groups and comedians also branch out to films. Notable film comedians include Ateng, S Bagio, Jojon, Ade Juwita, and Benyamin Sueb, and the members of the Warkop DKI comedy group.

The Warkop group made more than 35 films from 1979 to 1994. The most recent Warkop DKI film, 'Warkop DKI Reborn', received two awards from the Indonesian Record Museum (MURI) as the film with the largest number of views in one day and the movie with the fastest growing audience. Some of the most award-winning and notable Indonesian Comedy films include Warkop DKI, Get Married, Get Married 2, Get Married 3, Maling Kutang (The Bra Thief), Menculik Miyabi (Kidnapping Miyabi), and My Stupid Boss. Benyamin Biang Kerok. The comedy elements in several films are found in the main characters. Most of the characters introduce some absurd and physical forms of humor related to aspects of Indonesian cultures or Indonesian people's daily life habits.

Some comedic films are adapted from popular novels; for example, Raditya Dika was first famous for his book Kambing Jantan, which was made into a feature film. The comedy film Hangout, released in 2016, was directed by Raditya Dika and is one of the highest-grossing Indonesian films of all time.

=== Newspaper ===
Two of the longest-running Indonesian serial cartoons are Panji Koming and Oom Pasikom. Both are biting social and political commentary published weekly on the newspaper Kompas.

== Notable comedians ==
Number	Image	Name	Years active
1		Kasino Hadiwibowo (1950 – 1997)	1973–1997
2		Nanu Moeljono (1952 – 1983)	1973–1980
3		Rudy Badil (1945 – 2019)	1973–1979
4		Wahjoe Sardono (1951 – 2001)	1975–2001
5		Indrodjojo Kusumonegoro (born 1958)	1976–sekarang
6		Ateng (1942 – 2003)	
7		S Bagio	
8		Jojon (1947 – 2014)	
9		Ade Juwita (1965 – 2015)	
10		Benyamin Sueb (1939 – 1995)	
