= Too Good to Stop Now =

Too Good to Stop Now may refer to:

- Too Good to Stop Now (song), a 1984 song recorded by Mickey Gilley
- Too Good to Stop Now (Mickey Gilley album), 1984
- Too Good to Stop Now (John Schneider album), 1984
