= Just Long Enough to Say Goodbye =

Single by Mickey Gilley

from the album The Songs We Made Love To
- B-side: "Tying One On (To Take One Off My Mind)"
- Released: March 5, 1979
- Genre: Country
- Length: 2:33
- Label: Playboy
- Songwriter(s): Jerry Foster, Bill Rice
- Producer(s): Eddie Kilroy

Mickey Gilley singles chronology
"The Song We Made Love To" (1978)	"Just Long Enough to Say Goodbye" (1979)	"My Silver Lining" (1979)

"Just Long Enough to Say Goodbye" is a song written by Bill Rice and Jerry Foster, and recorded by American country music artist Mickey Gilley. It was released in March 1979 as the second and final single from his album The Songs We Made Love To. The song reached number 10 on the U.S. Billboard Hot Country Singles chart and number 10 on the Canadian RPM Country Tracks chart.

== Chart performance ==
Chart (1979)	Peak position
US Hot Country Songs (Billboard)	10
Canadian RPM Country Tracks	10
