= Invitation Only =

Invitation Only may refer to:

- Invitation Only (film) Taiwanese horror film
- Invitation Only (album) album by Mickey Gilley
- Invitation Only, album by Will Downing 1997
- Invitation Only (Fabulous Thunderbirds video album)

== See also ==
- By Invitation Only album by Michael Schenker Group
