= My Silver Lining (Mickey Gilley song) =

Single by Mickey Gilley

from the album Mickey Gilley
- B-side: "Picture of Our Love"
- Released: July 9, 1979
- Genre: Country
- Length: 2:12
- Label: Epic
- Songwriter(s): Roger Murrah, Tina Murrah
- Producer(s): Jerry Foster, Bill Rice

Mickey Gilley singles chronology
"Just Long Enough to Say Goodbye" (1979)	"My Silver Lining" (1979)	"A Little Gettin' Used To" (1979)

"My Silver Lining" is a song written by Roger Murrah and Tina Murrah, and recorded by American country music artist Mickey Gilley. It was released in July 1979 as the lead single from his album Mickey Gilley. The song reached number 8 on the U.S. Billboard Hot Country Singles chart and number 62 on the Canadian RPM Country Tracks chart.

== Chart performance ==
Chart (1979)	Peak position
US Hot Country Songs (Billboard)	8
Canadian RPM Country Tracks	62
