= Overnight Sensation (disambiguation) =

Overnight Sensation is an album and its title song by Motörhead.

Overnight Sensation may also refer to:

- Over-Nite Sensation, a 1973 album by the Mothers
- "Overnight Sensation" (song), a 1975 song written by Bob McDill and recorded by Mickey Gilley
- "Overnight Sensation (Hit Record)", a 1974 song by the Raspberries
- "Overnight Sensation", a 1986 song written by Mark Knopfler and recorded by Tina Turner from the album Break Every Rule
- "Overnight Sensation", a 1990 song by FireHouse from their debut album FireHouse
- Overnight Sensation (film), a 1932 German comedy film
- "Overnight Sensation", a 2021 song by American singer-songwriter Lily Rose

== See also ==
- Overnight Sensational, a 2006 album by Sam Moore
