= Maria Ozawa =

Japanese former adult video actress (born 1986)

- 小澤 マリア
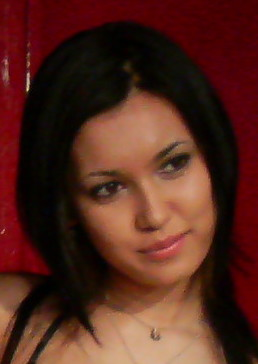
- Ozawa in 2007
- Born: 8 January 1986 (age 40); Hokkaido, Japan
- Other name: Miyabi (みやび)
- Years active: 2002–present
- Height: 1.62 m (5 ft 4 in)

Maria Ozawa (Japanese: 小澤 マリア, Hepburn: Ozawa Maria; born January 8, 1986) is a Japanese model and a former pornographic film actress. Early in her career as a model, she also used the name Miyabi (Japanese: みやび).

== Biography ==
=== 1986–2002: Early life ===
Ozawa was born in Hokkaido, Japan. Her mother is Japanese and her father is a French Canadian missionary. Ozawa graduated from the Christian Academy in Japan and has asserted that she has a higher ability to read and write English than Japanese. Ozawa played ice hockey daily and often sang karaoke after classes. She has revealed that she became sexually active at the age of 13. Ozawa also revealed she worked as a fast food server, a KTV bar attendant and a Japanese kindergarten school teacher.

In 2002, when she was 16, Ozawa debuted in a 30-second Japanese TV commercial for DARS Chocolate alongside the Japanese pop duo KinKi Kids which featured Ozawa sharing chocolate with one of the two singers while secretly holding hands with the other.

=== 2005–2007: Career beginnings ===
Ozawa discovered adult videos (AV) by watching sex tapes she borrowed from a friend's brother. Unlike most AV actresses, Ozawa was not scouted. She was introduced to the industry by a friend who appeared in AVs. She began by modeling in June 2005 under the name Miyabi for the pornographic site Shirouto-Teien.com, which resulted in several sets of photographs and a short hardcore gonzo which was video released in CD-R and DVD-R formats.

She was then signed by S1 No. 1 Style, a Japanese AV studio that produces hardcore pornography. On October 7, 2005, she premiered as Maria Ozawa with the video New Face – Number One Style (新人xギリモザ ナンバーワンスタイル), directed by Hideto Aki. Ozawa remembers that she was so nervous during the filming of her first AV that she could not look at her co-star in the face. At S1, Ozawa subsequently appeared in one original video per month until February 2007. She was involved in several S1 compilation videos including the company's entry in the 2006 AV Open, a competition between Japanese AV studios for the best selling video. The S1 video Hyper – Barely There Mosaic (ハイパーギリギリモザイク), featuring Ozawa along with other AV idols Sora Aoi, Yua Aida, Yuma Asami, and Honoka (plus a short preview for Rin Aoki), won first place.

In early 2007, Ozawa, along with Rin Suzuka, Reina Matsushima and Rin Aoki, left S1 with its emphasis on glamour to a new start-up company, DAS, which featured graphic scenes of creampie and simulated rape. On April 25, 2007, DAS released their first videos, with Ozawa starring in (Beautiful Eurasian News Anchor Maria Ozawa Desiring Nakadashi Rape). By the end of 2007, she signed (not exclusively) with Attackers (アタッカーズ), an established AV studio that specializes in thematic rape pornography.

Ozawa has also appeared in V-Cinema films, a photobook, and several glamour ("gravure") videos. In 2007, she played the character Anita (ｱﾆｰﾀ) in a popular Japanese TV drama, Tokumei Kakarichō Tadano Hitoshi (特命係長・只野仁) on TV Asahi. She also was on a 2007 episode of the Japanese variety show Megami no hatena ("The Goddess of What Is That") on Nihon TV as part of a series with AV actresses telling why they went into AV work. She has also appeared on Japanese MTV with the hip hop artist Seamo and in the 2007 music video "Summer Time in the D.S.C." with the Yokohama hip hop group DS455.

Ozawa could be seen in 2007 performing twice at the Shinjuku striptease bar "Shinjuku New Art", for which she took dance lessons to prepare. She danced in a variety of outfits, including appearing as a belly-dancer, a geisha and a cowgirl. Three videos were released of her performance and a behind-the-scenes interview.

=== 2008–2009: Rise to prominence ===
In June 2008, Ozawa changed studios once again, signing with a small studio, Ran-maru which released her first video with them on July 19, 2008. Ran-maru, along with Ozawa's previous studios, S1, DAS and Attackers, are all part of Japan's largest group of AV companies, the Hokuto Corporation.

In August 2008, Ozawa acted in her first mainstream movie, Invitation Only, billed as "Taiwan's First-Ever Slasher Horror". The film is produced by Three Dots Entertainment in Taipei, Taiwan and co-stars Julianne Chu. Ozawa plays a supermodel. She spoke both English and Japanese in the movie. Ozawa's professionalism impressed her co-workers and her role was expanded to include further scenes. Ozawa also did a photoshoot for the Taiwanese version of FHM in May 2009.

Ozawa followed up on her Shinjuku experience by starring in a cabaret show, "Tokyo Nights" at the Grand Lisboa Hotel in Macau from August 16 to September 6, 2008, which also featured several other Japanese performers. "Tokyo Nights" received mixed reviews. Promotional materials show her with a temporary tattoo.

XVN advertised in September 2008 about Maria Ozawa appearing in her first "uncensored" movies, which do not have the mosaic pixelation used to obscure the genitals in standard Japanese porn. Four uncensored 45-minute videos of Ozawa and a single male actor were released online at XVN in September 2008. The material from the first two videos was edited for a 90-minute DVD, Tora-Tora Platinum Vol. 49 Maria Ozawa (October 1, 2008), and the second two videos were combined as Tora-Tora Platinum Vol. 52 Maria Ozawa (November 17, 2008). Unused clips were combined and published under Tora-Tora Platinum Vol. 55 Maria Ozawa (November 23, 2008). However, it was later revealed that two little known fantasy themed uncensored titles predated the XVN clips. The first (now out of print) is titled If Maria Ozawa Is a Bubble Princess (December 15, 2006). The second is a parody of the anime/manga Death Note titled Meath Note (December 15, 2006).

According to a September 2009 news report, production house Maxima Pictures was "pulling the necessary strings" to have Ozawa appear in an Indonesian comedy film titled Menculik Miyabi ("Kidnapping Miyabi"), which was planned for release at the end of 2009. Although advertisements in the Indonesian language calling Ozawa's Muslim fans to piety and featuring Ozawa in jilbāb (Indonesian hijab) were issued on occasions of Ramadan and Eid ul-Fitr, the Indonesian Ulema Council condemned the efforts for the film. A protest was held and the film's producer canceled Ozawa's planned trip to Indonesia for the filming. The movie's plot had to be altered and Ozawa's scenes were all filmed in Tokyo. Menculik Miyabi was eventually released in Indonesia in May 2010.

In November 2009, articles in Weekly Playboy and The Tokyo Reporter reported that Ozawa was registered with the delivery health club Tiger's Hole (虎の穴, Tora no Ana) in Shibuya ward. They also cited the possibility that her photograph and profile at the club's site was "set up simply for publicity".

For the 2009 AV GrandPrix, three studios—DAS, Moodyz, and M's Video Group—all selected videos starring Ozawa as their entries in the contest. The DAS compilation The Queen of DAS won the Best Violence Video Award and the M's Video Group entry Oral Venus took one of the Special Awards in the Featured Actress Video category. In January 2009, Ozawa returned to DAS to film Shemale Orgy Gangbang Rape (集団ニューハーフ輪姦乱交レイプ小澤マリア) with three transsexual actresses and in March 2009 entered the Japanese porn genre of tentacle rape with the video Monster Swallowing Ecstasy Maria Ozawa (触獣丸呑みアクメ 小澤マリア) for SOD. Her last adult video of 2010, Queen of Bukkake, Nakadashi, Gang Rape (女王様ブッカケ中出し輪姦ザーメン塗れの元S女), directed by Dragon Nishikawa, was released by Cross in April 2010.

In an interview from 2015, Ozawa told reporters that she had quit the AV industry five years previously to pursue her goals: "I had a dream and I wanted to do it...I wanted to change my career." She also said that she hoped to overcome the stigma associated with her AV career.

=== 2010s: Asian celebrity and businesswoman ===
In November 2011, Ozawa co-starred with Asami and AV actress Mahiro Aine in Naoyuki Tomomatsu's science fiction V-Cinema release Karei naru erogami-ke no ichizoku: Shinsō reijō wa denki shitsuji no yume o miru ka, which was also released with English subtitles as Erotibot. She was also cast in the starring role for the erotic horror V-cinema feature Tokyo Species which was released on DVD in February 2012.

In October 2012, it was announced that Ozawa planned to engage in the Mainland China entertainment market on a full-time basis and was to sign with the media company Beijing Tuopu Laiyin.

Ozawa visited the Philippines in April 2015 and made a guest appearance on the Manila radio show, Magic 89.9's Boys Night Out. In an interview after the show, Ozawa said she had an agent representing her in the Philippines and would be interested in appearing in a mainstream movie there. She was also the June 2015 cover girl for FHM Philippines magazine. Ozawa returned to Manila in June 2015 for an autograph session for FHM at Resorts World Manila. She also announced that she would be co-starring with Filipino actor Robin Padilla in the horror-action film Nilalang ("Creature") which was due to start shooting in August 2015. The film was slated to be shown at the 2015 Metro Manila Film Festival, to which Padilla withdrew from and was replaced by Cesar Montano; the film also starred Yam Concepcion and Meg Imperial. Ozawa said she intended to take acting lessons and learn some Tagalog for the film. Ozawa travelled to the Philippines once again in July 2015 for FHM Philippines at their "100 Sexiest Women in the World 2015" party (Ozawa finished in 16th place after winner Jennylyn Mercado) and the VIP event on July 11 at the SMX Convention Center. Summit Media, the publisher of FHM, released Ozawa's gravure book along with Andrea Torres.

Ozawa is an entrepreneur and operates multiple businesses in Japan and the Philippines. In December 2024, she cosplayed, unannounced, as the "Vengeful Spirit" Dota 2 character on stage at ESL One held in Bangkok.

In January 2026, Ozawa appeared on the YouTube series Pinoy Pawnstars, where she sold a pink underwear item she described as a personal “lucky charm” to Filipino content creator Boss Toyo. Ozawa initially set the price at ₱150,000, citing its sentimental value and use during significant events, but after negotiation, the item was sold for approximately ₱20,500–₱25,500 and signed for display as memorabilia.

== Personal life ==
In 2017, Ozawa began dating Filipino chef Jose Sarasola. The couple ended their relationship in December 2021.

== Filmography ==
=== Film ===
- Invitation Only, Kevin Ko, Three Dots Entertainment Co. Ltd., Taiwan (August 2008)
- Menculik Miyabi, Findo Purwono HW, Maxima Pictures., Indonesia (2010)
- Hantu Tanah Kusir, Findo Purwono HW, Maxima Pictures., Indonesia (2010)
- Nilalang, VIVA Films, Philippines (2015)

=== V-Cinema ===
- Maid's Room: Return of the Master (メイドの部屋 ～お帰りなさいませ、ご主人様～) (April 2007)
- Kekkō Kamen Royale (けっこう仮面 ロワイヤル) (May 2007)
- Kekkō Kamen Premium (けっこう仮面 プレミアム) (June 2007)
- Kekkō Kamen Forever (けっこう仮面 フォーエバー) (July 2007)
- Erotibot (華麗なるエロ神家の一族 -深窓令嬢は電気執事の夢をみるか-, Karei naru erogami-ke no ichizoku: Shinsō reijō wa denki shitsuji no yume o miru ka) (November 2011)
- Tokyo Species (February 2012)

=== Television ===
- Tokumei Kakarichō Tadano Hitoshi (特命係長・只野仁) (TV Asahi)
  - 2nd special feature (August 7, 2005) as Anita, a sauna girl
  - 3rd season series (January 12 – March 16, 2007) as Anita, a sauna girl (turned stripper in the 31st story, the last episode of the season)
- HAPPinas Happy Hour as host/performer (TV5)
- Pepito Manaloto as herself (GMA Network)
- Pulang Araw as Haruka (GMA Network) (2024)

=== Photobooks ===
- 小澤マリア1st.写真集 X・Star (Maria Ozawa's 1st Photobook – X・Star) – May 23, 2006, 彩文館出版 (ISBN 4-7756-0129-6)

Preceded by Arny Ross	FHM Philippines Cover Girl (June 2015)	Succeeded by Valeen Montenegro
