= Closing time effect =

Social phenomenon concerning perceived attractiveness of others

"Closing time effect" refers to the phenomenon whereby people's perception of other people's attractiveness increases as it gets later into the night. The observation was first made by Mickey Gilley in his song, "Don't the Girls All Get Prettier at Closing Time" in 1975. Subsequently, it caught the attention of social psychologists who used scientific testing to gather evidence in support of the idea.

== The first experiment ==
James W. Pennebaker et al. (1979) conducted the first experiment testing this observation. Using 52 males and 51 females as subjects at three bars near a college campus, experimenters asked individuals the following question: "On a scale from 1 to 10, where 1 indicates 'not attractive', 5 indicates 'average', and 10 indicates 'extremely attractive,' how would you rate the opposite-sex individuals here tonight." The experimenters took this survey at 9:00 pm, 10:30 pm and at midnight. Results showed that individuals' perception of people's attractiveness in the bar increased the later it got.

== Theory ==
The freedom of potentially going home with someone in the bar is threatened as the night comes closer to ending, according to the reactance theory. Dissonance theory has also been suggested as an explanation, proposing that as the night progresses, individuals’ intentions to leave with someone become stronger; however, leaving the bar with someone who they may find unattractive causes dissonance, increasing the perceived attractiveness of the potential mate.

== Other studies ==
Following the first study performed by Pennebaker et al. in 1979, Nida and Koon (1983) found evidence of the closing time effect in a country and western bar but did not find it in a campus bar. Gladue and Delaney (1990) found that individuals of the opposite gender became more attractive as a factor of time, but that photos of the opposite gender did not. They found that male participants rated the most attractive photos higher but ratings of the least attractive photos also decreased. Females showed no changes over time in their photo ratings of males. Madey, Simo, Dillworth, and Kemper (1996) found the effect in a nightclub near a university, but only for participants not in a relationship. The authors argued that only participants not in a relationship should experience a threat to their choice of companion. Sprecher et al. (1984) did not find a closing-time effect.

== Effect of alcohol ==
Johnco, Wheeler and Taylor (2010) measured the attractiveness of participants over a night while also controlling for the effect of alcohol consumption by measuring their blood alcohol content with a breathalyzer each time that they measured individuals' perceptions of physical attractiveness. They used BAC as a time varying covariate in a repeated measures design, with 87 participants at a beachside pub in Sydney, Australia, on four consecutive Saturday nights, between 9 pm and midnight. They found that both perceptions of attractiveness as well as BAC increased as a factor of time. They concluded that BAC explained a significant portion of the increase in opposite-sex attractiveness but that a substantial effect remains after adjusting for BAC.

== Other possible explanations ==
One other possible explanation about the cause of this perception of higher attractiveness is "mere familiarity or exposure". Previously seen stimuli may be perceived more positively than new stimuli. Another explanation comes from the commodity theory. According to commodity theory, as people find mates in the bar and leave with them, there is a scarcity of individuals left in the bar. This scarcity increases the desirability and perceived attractiveness of those left in the bar.

== Sources ==
- Brehm, J. W. (1966). A theory of psychological reactance. New York: Academic.
- Gilley, M. (1975). Don't all the girls get prettier at closing time. In The Best of Mickey Gilley (Vol. 2). Columbia Records. Written by Baker Knight, Singleton Music Company. New York: Broadcast Music, Inc.
- Halberstadt, J., Rhodes, G., & Catty, S. R. (2003). Subjective and objective familiarity as explanations for the attraction to average faces. In F. Columbus (Ed.), Advances in psychology research (pp. 91–106). New York: Nova Science Publishers.
- The attractiveness of average faces is not a generalized mere exposure effect. Social Cognition, 23, 205–217.
