= Ketoprak (disambiguation) =

Ketoprak may refer to:

- Ketoprak, a traditional theater genre of Java, similar to wayang wong
- Ketoprak (dish), a Jakartan and West Javanese vegetarian dish of fried tahu, bihun, cucumber and bean sprout, served in peanut sauce, similar to Gado-gado
- Ketoprak Humor, an Indonesian comedy TV show on RCTI
- It is also an Indonesian name for the fish Belontia hasselti
