= Honky Tonk Memories =

Single by Mickey Gilley

from the album First Class
- B-side: "Five Foot Two Eyes of Blue (Has Anybody My Girl)"
- Released: June 1977
- Genre: Country
- Length: 2:45
- Label: Playboy
- Songwriter(s): Rory Bourke, Gene Dobbins, Johnny Wilson
- Producer(s): Eddie Kilroy

Mickey Gilley singles chronology
"She's Pulling Me Back Again" (1977)	"Honky Tonk Memories" (1977)	"Chains of Love" (1977)

"Honky Tonk Memories" is a song written by Rory Bourke, Gene Dobbins and Johnny Wilson, and recorded by American country music artist Mickey Gilley. It was released in June 1977 as the second single from his album First Class. The song reached number 4 on the Billboard Hot Country Singles chart and number 2 on the RPM Country Tracks chart in Canada.

== Chart performance ==
Chart (1977)	Peak position
US Hot Country Songs (Billboard)	4
Canadian RPM Country Tracks	2
