= The Power of Positive Drinkin' =

Single by Mickey Gilley

from the album Flyin' High
- B-side: "Playing My Old Piano"
- Released: March 18, 1978
- Genre: Country
- Length: 2:27
- Label: Playboy
- Songwriters: Rick Klang; Don Pfrimmer
- Producer: Eddie Kilroy

Mickey Gilley singles chronology
"Chains of Love" (1977)	"The Power of Positive Drinkin'" (1978)	"Here Comes the Hurt Again" (1978)

"Power of Positive Drinkin'" is a song written by Don Pfrimmer and Rick Klang, and recorded by American country music artist Mickey Gilley. It was released in March 1978 as the lead single from his album Flyin' High. The song reached number 8 on the U.S. Billboard Hot Country Singles chart and number 7 on the Canadian RPM Country Tracks chart.

== Chart performance ==
Chart (1978)	Peak position
US Hot Country Songs (Billboard)	8
Canadian RPM Country Tracks	7
