= Chains of Love =

Chains of Love may refer to:

== Music ==
- "Chains of Love" (Charli XCX song) (2025)
- "Chains of Love" (Erasure song) (1988)
- "Chains of Love" (Ahmet Ertegun song), a song popularized by Big Joe Turner and Pat Boone
- "Chains of Love" (Mickey Gilley song) (1977)
- "Chains of Love" (Terry Ronald song) (1991)
- "Chains of Love", a 1967 song by J.J. Barnes

== Other uses ==
- Chains of Love (TV series), a 2001 American reality television series
