= She's Pulling Me Back Again =

Single by Mickey Gilley

from the album First Class
- B-side: "Sweet Mama Goodtimes"
- Released: February 1977
- Genre: Country
- Length: 2:29
- Label: Playboy
- Songwriter(s): Bill Rice; Jerry Foster
- Producer(s): Eddie Kilroy

Mickey Gilley singles chronology
"Lawdy, Miss Clawdy" (1976)	"She's Pulling Me Back Again" (1977)	"Honky Tonk Memories" (1977)

"She's Pulling Me Back Again" is a song written by Bill Rice and Jerry Foster, and recorded by American country music artist Mickey Gilley. It was released in February 1977 as the first single from the album First Class. The song was Gilley's seventh number one on the country chart. The single stayed at number one for a single week and spent a total of thirteen weeks on the country chart.

== Charts ==
=== Weekly charts ===
Chart (1977)	Peak position
US Hot Country Songs (Billboard)	1
Canadian RPM Country Tracks	1

=== Year-end charts ===
Chart (1977)	Position
US Hot Country Songs (Billboard)	7
