= Here Comes the Hurt Again =

Single by Mickey Gilley

from the album Flyin' High
- B-side: "I Hate It, But I Drink It Anyway"
- Released: July 1978
- Genre: Country
- Length: 2:45
- Label: Playboy
- Songwriter(s): Jerry Foster, Bill Rice
- Producer(s): Eddie Kilroy

Mickey Gilley singles chronology
| "The Power of Positive Drinkin'" (1978) | "Here Comes the Hurt Again" (1978) | "The Song We Made Love To" (1979) |

"Here Comes the Hurt Again'" is a song written by Jerry Foster and Bill Rice, and recorded by American country music artist Mickey Gilley. It was released in July 1978 as the second single from his album Flyin' High. The song reached number 9 on the U.S. Billboard Hot Country Singles chart and number 43 on the Canadian RPM Country Tracks chart in Canada.

A re-recorded version of the song appears on the soundtrack to the 1980 film Urban Cowboy.

== Chart performance ==
| Chart (1978) | Peak position |
|---|---|
| US Hot Country Songs (Billboard) | 9 |
| Canadian RPM Country Tracks | 43 |
