= The Song We Made Love To =

Single by Mickey Gilley

from the album The Songs We Made Love To
- B-side: "Memphis Memories"
- Released: November 6, 1978
- Genre: Country
- Length: 2:12
- Label: Playboy
- Songwriter(s): Kenneth Wahle
- Producer(s): Eddie Kilroy

Mickey Gilley singles chronology
"Here Comes the Hurt Again" (1978)	"The Song We Made Love To" (1978)	"Just Long Enough to Say Goodbye" (1979)

"The Song We Made Love To" is a song written by Kenneth Wahle, and recorded by American country music artist Mickey Gilley. It was released in November 1978 as the lead single and title track from his album The Songs We Made Love To. The song reached number 13 on the U.S. Billboard Hot Country Singles chart and number 26 on the Canadian RPM Country Tracks chart in Canada.

== Chart performance ==
Chart (1978–1979)	Peak position
US Hot Country Songs (Billboard)	13
Canadian RPM Country Tracks	26
