= Your Memory Ain't What It Used to Be =

Single by Mickey Gilley

from the album I Feel Good About Lovin' You
- B-side: "Lonely Nights, Lonely Heartache"
- Released: December 16, 1985
- Genre: Country
- Length: 3:21
- Label: Epic
- Songwriter(s): Mary Fielder, Kim Morrison, Dickey Betts
- Producer(s): Norro Wilson

Mickey Gilley singles chronology
"You've Got Something on Your Mind" (1985)	"Your Memory Ain't What It Used to Be" (1985)	"Doo-Wah Days" (1986)

"Your Memory Ain't What It Used to Be" is a song recorded by American country music artist Mickey Gilley. It was released in December 1985 as the second and final single from his album I Feel Good About Lovin' You. The song reached number 5 on the U.S. Billboard Hot Country Singles chart and number 2 on the Canadian RPM Country Tracks chart in Canada. It was written by Mary Fielder, Kim Morrison and Dickey Betts.

== Chart performance ==
Chart (1985–1986)	Peak position
US Hot Country Songs (Billboard)	5
Canadian RPM Country Tracks	2
