= You've Got Something on Your Mind =

Single by Mickey Gilley

from the album I Feel Good About Lovin' You
- B-side: "I Feel Good About Lovin' You
- Released: August 19, 1985
- Genre: Country
- Length: 2:49
- Label: Epic
- Songwriter(s): Norro Wilson, Daniel Gibson, Roger Murrah
- Producer(s): Norro Wilson

Mickey Gilley singles chronology
"I'm the One Mama Warned You About" (1985)	"You've Got Something on Your Mind" (1985)	"Your Memory Ain't What It Used to Be" (1986)

"You've Got Something on Your Mind" is a song recorded by American country music artist Mickey Gilley. It was released in August 1985 as the lead single from his album I Feel Good About Lovin' You. The song reached number 10 on the U.S. Billboard Hot Country Singles chart and number 7 on the Canadian RPM Country Tracks chart in Canada. It was written by Norro Wilson, Daniel Gibson, and Roger Murrah.

== Chart performance ==
Chart (1985)	Peak position
US Hot Country Songs (Billboard)	10
Canadian RPM Country Tracks	7
