= Menculik Miyabi =

- Poster
- Directed by: Findo Purwono HW
- Written by: Bang Marqee
- Screenplay by: Bang Marqee
- Produced by: Ody Mulya Hidayat
- Starring: Maria Ozawa; Sabrina Pai; Nicky Tirta
- Cinematography: Joel F Zola
- Edited by: Waldo Brothers
- Music by: Joseph S Djafar
- Production company: Maxima Pictures
- Release date: 6 May 2010
- Running time: 85 minutes
- Country: Indonesia
- Language: Indonesian

Menculik Miyabi (Indonesian for Kidnapping Miyabi) is a 2010 Indonesian comedy film directed by Findo Purwono HW and produced by Ody Mulya Hidayat. Starring Sabrina Pai and Nicky Tirta, the film follows a young man who is obsessed with AV idol Maria Ozawa and, in an attempt to kidnap her, accidentally kidnaps a Taiwanese tourist. After the film was announced it was protested heavily by the Islamic Defenders Front, which resulted in Ozawa's role being cut almost entirely. Critical reception was unfavourable.

== Plot ==
Following a contest, Miyabi is asked to deliver a prize, consisting of two plane tickets, to Jakarta, Indonesia. Excited by the prospect, she begins learning about the country, but discovers upon attempting to board her flight that she has forgotten her passport and must remain in Tokyo.

Meanwhile, in Jakarta, Kevin and his friends Bimo and Aan are terrorised by Mike and his henchman. Mike bets them that they cannot find a beautiful woman to bring to his girlfriend Jessica's birthday party. Disgusted by Mike's childish treatment of the trio, Jessica – Kevin's childhood friend – breaks up with him.

At Kevin's home, Aan discovers that Miyabi is due to arrive in Indonesia and persuades the trio to go to Soekarno-Hatta Airport to see her. When a woman resembling Miyabi leaves the arrivals gate, the fans pursue her. Kevin and his friends force her into their car, while Aan secretly takes her passport. After several misunderstandings caused by the language barrier, the woman realises that her passport is missing. At the Japanese embassy, the boys discover that she is Mie Yao Bie, a Taiwanese woman. They plan to house her at Kevin's home for the three days needed to obtain a replacement passport. Although initially disgusted by them, Mie Yao Bie gradually grows fond of the boys, despite their inability to communicate verbally.

Later, Jessica visits Kevin's house to use his internet connection. Kevin helps her, and after nearly kissing, Jessica invites him to a film. Their date is interrupted when Mie Yao Bie arrives and enthusiastically hugs Kevin. Jessica concludes that Kevin is no different from other men and leaves the cinema. The following day, Mike steals the flowers Kevin intends to give Jessica as an apology and presents them to her himself.

Before the birthday party, Kevin discovers that Aan has been hiding Mie Yao Bie's passport. After confronting Aan, he returns it to her. Aan attends the party alone but is humiliated and forced to drink alcohol wearing only his boxers. Determined to stand up for himself and win Jessica's affection, Kevin arrives with Bimo and defeats Mike in a fight. Mike claims Kevin has still lost their bet because he brought no women. Mie Yao Bie then arrives with her Taiwanese friends and kisses each of the three boys on the cheek, enraging Mike, who leaves.

After hearing the full story, Jessica forgives Kevin. They begin dating and kiss. Several days later, Miyabi arrives in Jakarta but, due to a mistake with apartment numbers, delivers the prize to Bimo. Unaware of her identity, Bimo treats Miyabi as a courier.

== Production ==
Menculik Miyabi was directed by Findo Purwono HW and produced by Ody Mulya Hidayat of Maxima Pictures. The script was written by Bang Marqee; blogger-cum-novelist Raditya Dika was reportedly attached, but denied any connection owing in part to fears that his young readers would attempt to learn of Ozawa and her pornography. Cinematography was handled by Joel F Zola, while editing was completed by the Waldo Brothers. Music was provided by Joseph S Djafar, with Abdul Malik Deva and Bellamy on sound. The film starred Sabrina Pai, Nicky Tirta, Herfiza Novianti, Kevin Julio Chandra, and Hardi Fadhillah.

The film was initially meant to star Maria Ozawa, who was cast for the part at great expense. Commonly billed as Miyabi in Indonesia, Ozawa was a Eurasian AV idol from Japan who had become famous in 2005. As an AV idol she had acted in numerous pornographic films. For Menculik Miyabi she would have performed no nude scenes. However, as she had been a pornographic actress the hardline Islamic Defenders Front (Font Pembela Islam, or FPI) protested the production. A spokesman said that the group was "ready to die fighting" to prevent Ozawa's arrival; in other protests students burned women's underwear. Ultimately the Ministry of Culture and Tourism banned Ozawa from coming to Indonesia, and plans for her to film in Indonesia were dropped. She ultimately filmed several scenes in Japan, although she had reduced prominence in the final edit.

== Release and reception ==
Menculik Miyabi was released on 6 May 2010. The Indonesian Ulema Council protested its contents, while the FPI threatened to raid theatres showing the film. Otherwise the release proved uneventful. It saw mediocre box-office returns.

Marcel Thee, reviewing for The Jakarta Globe, found the film "another dud in a collection of tedious local comedies" which focused on "not particularly funny sex jokes and an equally hollow love story". Benny Benke of the Semarang-based Suara Merdeka, found the film's elements to be "unrelated" ("tidak terkait"), with the title serving only as a draw for male audiences.

Ozawa would later star in another Indonesian production, the horror film Hantu Tanah Kusir (Ghost of Tanah Kusir), in 2010. This film was also made by Maxima Pictures.

== Works cited ==
- Benke, Benny (7 May 2010). "'Menculik Miyabi' Langsung Ditentang MUI" ['Menculik Miyabi' Challenged by MUI]. Suara Merdeka (in Indonesian). Archived from the original on 4 March 2016.
- Benke, Benny (7 May 2010). "Menjajakan Miyabi" [Peddling Miyabi]. Suara Merdeka (in Indonesian). Archived from the original on 11 May 2010.
- "Government bans Miyabi from visiting Indonesia". The Jakarta Post. 13 October 2009. Archived from the original on 16 November 2011.
- "Hari Kedua, 'Menculik Miyabi' Ramai Ditonton" [Second Day, 'Menculik Miyabi' Has Many Viewers]. Kompas. 7 May 2010. Archived from the original on 4 March 2016.
- "Kredit Lengkap Menculik Miyabi" [Credits for Menculik Miyabi]. filmindonesia.or.id (in Indonesian). Jakarta: Konfidan Foundation. Archived from the original on 29 June 2017.
- "Miyabi film debuts without incident". The Jakarta Post. 8 May 2010. Archived from the original on 23 August 2013.
- "Miyabi to feature in Indonesian movie". The Jakarta Post. 19 September 2009. Archived from the original on 8 October 2012.
- Matondang, Patra (2 June 2010). "Profile: Ody Mulya: Controversy sells". The Jakarta Post. Archived from the original on 23 August 2013.
- Muharrami, Novi (7 May 2010). "Raditya Dika Protes Disebut Penulis Menculik Miyabi" [Raditya Dika Protests Being Called Writer of Menculik Miyabi]. Oke Zone (in Indonesian). Archived from the original on 24 October 2010.
- Sagita, Dessy (25 November 2010). "With Little Ado, Miyabi Arrives in Indonesian Theaters". The Jakarta Post. Archived from the original on 14 October 2011.
- Setiawati, Indah (10 October 2009). "FPI rallies against Miyabi; producer continues". The Jakarta Post. Archived from the original on 11 January 2010.
- Thee, Marcel (9 May 2010). "Miyabi Hits Theaters, but Was She Worth the Wait?". Jakarta Globe. Archived from the original on 1 October 2012.
