= That's All That Matters =

Single by Mickey Gilley

from the album That's All That Matters to Me
- B-side: "Blues Don't Care Who's Got 'Em"
- Released: September 1980
- Genre: Country
- Length: 2:38
- Label: Epic
- Songwriter(s): Hank Cochran
- Producer(s): Jim Ed Norman

Mickey Gilley singles chronology
"Stand by Me" (1980)	"That's All That Matters" (1980)	"A Headache Tomorrow (Or a Heartache Tonight)" (1981)

"That's All That Matters" is a song written by Hank Cochran, and recorded by American country music artist Ray Price in 1964. It has been recorded by multiple other country artists but the most famous recording was done by American country music artist Mickey Gilley. It was released in September 1980 as the first single and partial title track from his album That's All That Matters to Me. The song was Gilley's tenth number one on the country charts. The single went to number one for one week and spent a total of eleven weeks on the country chart.

== Chart performance ==
Chart (1980)	Peak position
US Hot Country Songs (Billboard)	1
US Bubbling Under Hot 100 (Billboard)	1
Canadian RPM Country Tracks	9
