= Rin Aoki =

Japanese model and AV idol

- 青木りん
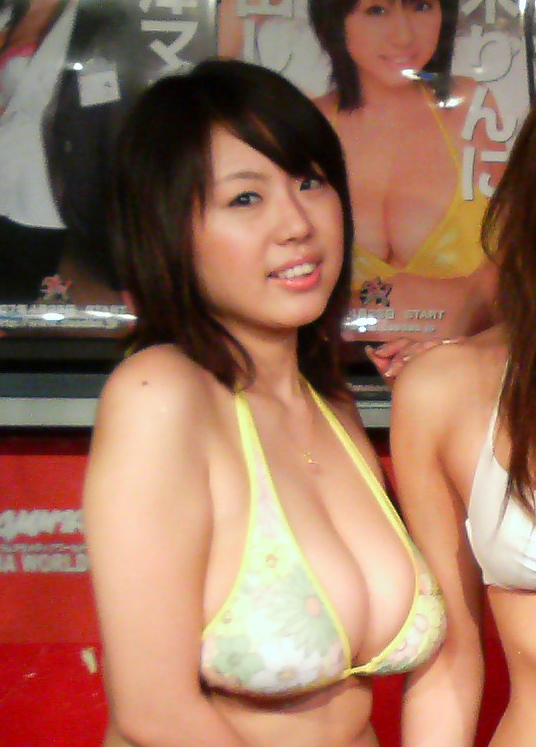
- Aoki in 2007
- Born: February 28, 1985 (age 41); Yamagata Prefecture, Japan
- Occupations: gravure model; AV idol; erotic dancer
- Height: 1.58 m (5 ft 2 in)

Rin Aoki (Japanese: 青木りん, Hepburn: Aoki Rin; born February 28, 1985) is a Japanese gravure model, AV idol and erotic dancer. She began as a gravure idol and later moved to hardcore video work where she became an award-winning AV idol.

== Life and career ==
=== Gravure idol ===
Aoki was born in Yamagata Prefecture on February 28, 1985. She was first scouted in Harajuku as a gravure model in 2002 at the age of 17. Her first gravure video, Burst, appeared in 2003 and she soon became a popular gravure idol. After two years as a gravure model, Aoki decided to enter the adult video scene and signed with the major Japanese AV company S1 No. 1 Style, one of the Hokuto Corporation group of companies. It is reported that her contract guaranteed her an estimated 13,000,000 yen (about $166,000) per movie, a sum greatly above the average even for top AV idols.

=== AV actress ===
Her first AV production with S1, K-cup Active Idol Risky Mosaic, appeared in May 2006 and was directed by Hideto Aki who also directed most of her subsequent videos with S1. She says she was comfortable with her first AV work but was embarrassed about showing her nipples because they were small and pale colored. After making ten original videos with S1 in almost a year, she left the studio along with Maria Ozawa and other fellow S1 actresses to join the startup company DAS. In contrast to S1 which specializes in the "softer" type of pornography with mostly straightforward boy-girl sex scenes, DAS videos ventured into more extreme areas such as simulated rape, creampie and watersports. Aoki starred in the first video of the DAS series DASD-001, 20 Shots Creampie!, released on April 25, 2007. She has made several more movies for DAS including her first inter-racial role in the DAS "Black Gang Rape" series.

By August 2008, Aoki was with a new start-up studio, OPPAI, which publicized her first video for them, 108 cm Kcup Rin, with a signing and modeling event. Although continuing to make movies for OPPAI, she has also appeared in videos for Attackers and yet another new studio, Ranmaru.

In the 2010s, Aoki became a freelance actress, working with many different studios and appearing in more than 500 adult films.

=== Popularity and recognition ===
Aoki has been associated with a genre of Japanese adult video (AV) performers noted for large bust size, a category that has existed in the industry since performers such as Kimiko Matsuzaka. According to sales rankings published by the DMM website, she was ranked third in 2006 and ninth in 2007 among the top 100 actresses.

Aoki had a small preview appearance in the S1 compilation video Hyper – Barely There Mosaic (ハイパーギリギリモザイク) with AV idols Sora Aoi, Yua Aida, Yuma Asami, Maria Ozawa and Honoka which won the 2006 AV Open competition among Japanese porn studios.

At the 7th annual Takeshi Kitano Entertainment Awards for 2006 sponsored by the Japanese tabloid newspaper Tokyo Sports (東京スポーツ), Aoki was honored with the Star AV Actress Award (主演AV女優賞).

== Filmography ==
Release date	Video title	Company	Director	Notes
2003-07-25	Burst	Vega; VEDV-49		Debut; Gravure
2003-10-31	Rin Aoki Blue Beans	Aqua House; DAH-38		Gravure
2005-01-20	Explosion	E-Net; SCID-31		Gravure
2005-03-24	EIGHT	Layfull; 14D		Gravure
2005-07-08	Rin Aoki Dynamite Channel ダイナマイトチャンネル 青木りん	Dynamite Channel; DYNAM-014		Gravure
2005-10-22	EIGHT - Virtual Sex	Layfull; 25D		Gravure
2005-11-22	EIGHT - Lesbian	Layfull; 27D		Gravure
2005-12-22	EIGHT - Confined	Layfull; 28D		Gravure
2006-03-17	Soul Milk Rin Aoki 乳魂 青木りん	Nippon Media; DCB-60		Gravure
2006-05-07	K-cup Active Idol Risky Mosaic 現役アイドル ギリギリモザイク	S1; ONED-432	Hideto Aki	Adult Video Debut
2006-06-07	Six Costumes Pakopako! 6つのコスチュームでパコパコ！	S1; ONED-459	Yukihiko Shimamura	
2006-07-07	Super Titty-Fucking 4 激パイズリ4	S1; ONED-482	Hideto Aki	
2006-08-07	Delusional Special Bath 妄想的特殊浴場	S1; ONED-506	Hideto Aki	
2006-08-07	Hyper – Barely There Mosaic ハイパーギリギリモザイク	S1; ONSD-028		Compilation; With Sora Aoi, Yua Aida, Maria Ozawa, Yuma Asami & Honoka; 2006 AV Open winner
2006-09-19	Climax! Too Much Coming Squirting Fuck 絶頂！イキまくり潮吹きFUCK	S1; ONED-548	Hideto Aki	
2006-10-17	Endless Bakobako 13 無限バコバコ13	S1; ONED-561	Hideto Aki	
2006-11-17	BakoBako Gangbang 19 バコバコ乱交19	S1; ONED-612	Hideto Aki	
2006-12-19	The Big Tits Nursery Just for Me 僕だけのボイン保育園	S1; ONED-635	Hideto Aki	
2007-01-07	Sex on the Beach, Southern Island Pakopako! SEX ON THE BEACH～南の島でパコパコ！	S1; ONED-652	Hideto Aki	
2007-02-07	Hyper-Risky Mosaic ハイパーギリギリモザイク	S1; ONED-676	Hideto Aki	
2007-04-25	20 Shots Creampie! 20連発中出し！	DAS; DASD-001	Hokusai	
2007-05-13	Genuine Bukkake 真性ぶっかけ	Moodyz; MIGD-006	Alala Kurosawa	
2007-06-25	Big Breast Cattle 巨大乳房家畜	DAS; DASD-009	Hideto Aki	
2007-07-25	K-Cup Gravure Idol Nakadashi Rape; Kカップ現役グラビアイドル中出しレイプ	DAS; DASD-015		
2007-08-07	Raped in Husband's Presence 夫の目の前で犯されて―巨乳アイドルの秘密	Attackers Shark; SHKD-302	Kenzo Nagira	
2007-08-25	Fainting Orgasm Endless Squirting 悶絶アクメ無制限潮吹き	DAS; DASD-020	Ekimoto	
2007-09-07	Rin Aoki SM Live Show グラビアアイドル調教 青木りん 服従調教LIVE SPECIAL！	Attackers; SSPD-040	Kenji Hayami	
2007-10-01	Genuine Nakadashi 真性中出し	Moodyz; MIGD-059	Hiroa	
2007-11-01	Nakadashi Tonic, Erotic Toy 14 強精中出しエロ玩具14	Moodyz; MIGD-070	Fubuki Sakura	
2007-12-07	Female Ninja Torture Rape 3 (also known as Princess Insult 3) くノ一拷問凌辱3 椿姫・極秘輿入ノ章	Attackers; AVGL-002	Katsuyuki Hasegawa	With Megu Ayase & Rin Hayakawa; Entry in 2008 AV Grand Prix contest
2008-01-25	Rin Aoki - Fallen Urine-Drinking Pig Idol 落ちぶれた飲尿メス豚アイドル	DAS; DASD-042		
2008-02-13	Hyper Digital Mosaic Creampie Orgy 4 Hours ハイモザ 中出し大乱交4時間	Moodyz Best; MIBD-254		Compilation with Rina Wakamiya, Sakurako, Reika, RiRi, Risako Konno, Chihiro Hara, Serina Hayakawa
2008-02-25	Punishment Obscene Discipline - Lesbian Torture 強制執行淫刑 レズ拷問	DAS; DASD-045		
2008-02-25	Slave File Vol. 1 ダスッ！奴隷FILE vol.1	DAS; DAZD-005		Compilation; With Maria Ozawa and Reina Matsushima
2008-03-25	Rina Aoki - Black Gang Rape 黒人輪姦	DAS; DASD-048	Hokusai	
2008-08-19	108 cm Kcup Rin; 108cm Kcup OPPAI専属デビュー 青木りん	OPPAI; PPPD-0014		
2008-09-19	108 cm Kcup Rin 110 cm Lcup Yuko; 110cm Lcup 108cm Kcup 奇跡のW爆乳 櫻井ゆうこ 青木りん	OPPAI; PPSD-006		Co-starring Yuko Sakurai
2008-10-19	Penis for Life Rin Aoki 一生チンポを挟んでいたい。 青木りん	Ranmaru; TYOD-017		
2008-11-22	Largest-ever super-tits gangbang 108cmKcup 103cmKcup 103cmJcup 97cmHcup 史上最高の爆乳大乱交	OPPAI; AVGL-113		With Chichi Asada, Rui Akikawa & Ryo Momose; Entry in the 2009 AV Grand Prix contest
2008-12-07	Chased Woman 尾けられた女 青木りん	Attackers Ryubaku; RBD-131	Katsuyuki Hasegawa	
2009-01-19	108 cm Kcup Paizuri Rin Aoki; 108cmKcup パイズリ 青木りん	OPPAI; PPPD-028		
2009-02-19	108 cm Kcup Female Teacher Rin Aoki; 108cmKcup 女教師 青木りん	OPPAI; PPPD-035		
2009-03-07	Married Woman Self-Sacrifice Rape 人妻自己犠牲レイプ 私は自ら犯されにゆく。	Attackers Inmad; ATID-145	Kenzo Nagira	With Riria Himesaki
2009-04-19	108 cm Kcup Soap Rin Aoki; 108cmKcup ソープ 青木りん	OPPAI; PPPD-049		
2009-05-19	108 cm Kcup OL Rin Aoki; 108cmKcup OL 青木りん	OPPAI; PPPD-051		
2009-06-19	108 cm K Cup, 99 cm I Cup, W Big Tits Dream Rin Aoki & Nana Aoyama; 108cmKcup 99cmIcup W爆乳ドリーム 青木りん 青山菜々	OPPAI; PPSD-015		Co-starring Nana Aoyama
2009-07-19	108 cm Kcup Nurse Rin Aoki; 108cmKcup ナース 青木りん	OPPAI; PPPD-060		
2009-08-13	Super Tits Body Special 超爆乳ボディSPECIAL	Moodyz Real; MIRD-066	Kyosei	With Meisa Hanai, Ruru Anoa & Hinata Komine
2009-09-19	Fan Thanksgiving Festival Rin Aoki 青木りんのファンパイ射祭 りんがみんなの為に一肌脱ぎます	OPPAI; PPPD-070		
2009-10-19	Rin Aoki Lustful Body 青木りんの肉感BODY	Rookie; RKI-042	Kyosei	
2009-11-07	Intensely Exhausted Bursting Tits Wife's Routine Indecency - Zealous Yoga Instructor Somewhat Plump Madame, Rin's Affair 悶絶爆乳妻の卑猥な日常 ヨガダイエットに励むムッチムチな奥さん、りんの場合 青木りん	Madonna Fitch; JUFD-083	Tairyo Hata	
2009-11-13	My Loving Teacher Rin スキだらけのボインにイタズラ三昧	Moodyz Diva; MIDD-561	H.HANAKI	
2010-03-19	Rin Aoki In Soap Land 青木りんのソープしちゃうぞ	Crystal-Eizou e-Kiss; EKDV-087	Yukihiko Shimamura	
2010-04-16	Document Red Edition DX Hypnosis 30 催眠 赤 DX 30 ドキュメント編	Audaz; AD-189	Rusher Miyoshi	
2010-04-16	Document Red Edition DX Hypnosis 30 Super Mind Control 催眠 赤 DX 30 スーパーmc編	Audaz; AD-190	Rusher Miyoshi	
2010-04-23	Non Stop Orgasm - Portio Endorphin; NON STOP ORGASM ポルチオエンドルフィン	Crystal-Eizou e-Kiss; EKDV-092	Meo Sakamoto	
2010-08-13	Brush Down Losing One's Virginity 青木りんのザ・筆おろし	Crystal-Eizou e-Kiss; EKDV-115		

== Photobooks ==
- Rin's I Land — (AquaHouse) — March 2003 (ISBN 4860460693)
- Eat Me — (Saibunkan) — June 2005 (ISBN 4775600818)
- Pineapple (パイナポ) — (Saibunkan) — May 2006 (ISBN 477560130X)
