= Too Good to Stop Now (Mickey Gilley album) =

Studio album by Mickey Gilley
- Released: 1984
- Studio: Gilley’s Recording Studio (Pasadena, Texas); Woodland (Nashville, Tennessee); Record Plant (Los Angeles, California)
- Genre: Country
- Label: Epic
- Producer: John Boylan

Mickey Gilley chronology
It Takes Believers (with Charly McClain) (1984)	Too Good to Stop Now (1984)	Live at Gilley’s (1985)

Too Good to Stop Now is a studio album by American country music singer Mickey Gilley released in 1984 by Epic Records. The album peaked at #34 in the US country chart. The title track, “Too Good to Stop Now”, reached #4 in the US country chart and #1 in the Canadian country chart. Another single from the album, “I’m the One Mama Warned You About” reached #10 in the country charts of both countries.

== Track listing ==
Side one

1. "Too Good to Stop Now” (Bob McDill, Rory Michael Bourke) – 3:25
2. "Make It Like the First Time" (J. C. Cunningham) – 3:51
3. "Shoulder to Cry On” (Donald R. Miller, Ron Birmann) – 3:41
4. "When She Runs Out of Fools" (Steve Pippin, George Steven Jobe) – 3:46
5. "Right Side of the Wrong Bed" (Fred Knipe, Stephen Chandler, Duncan Stitt) – 2:31

Side two

1. "Everything I Own" (David Gates) – 3:17
2. "Reminders" (Kent Robbins, John Jarrard) – 3:54
3. "You Can Lie to Me Tonight" (Tom Campbell, Kerry Chater) – 3:03
4. "I'm the One Mama Warned You About" (Mickey James, Gail Lynn Zeiler) – 2:50
5. "Quittin’ Time" (Ron Hellard, Michael Garvin, Bucky Jones) – 3:27

== Personnel ==
- Mickey Gilley - lead vocals, grand piano
- Jay Winding: keyboards
- Andrew Gold, Josh Leo, Brent Rowan, Rocky Stone - guitar
- Bob Glaub - bass
- Michael Botts - drums
- Buddy Emmons - pedal steel
- Ron Levine - fiddle
- Beverly Randall, Ann-Marie Cianciola - backing vocals
- Norman Carlson - saxophone

== Production ==
- Recorded at: Gilley's Recording Studio, Pasadena, Texas, Woodland Sound Studios, Nashville, Tennessee and Record Plant, Los Angeles, California.
- Engineer: Paul Grupp
- Assistant Engineers: Bert Frilot, Ken Criblez, Bill Hutchinson
- Mixed on the Sony Digital System
- Manager: Cliff Willdeboer
- Management: Sherwood Cryer, Sandy & David Brokaw
- Album front cover photo: Al Rogers
- Album back cover photo: Norman Seeff
