= I'm the One Mama Warned You About =

Single by Mickey Gilley

from the album Too Good to Stop Now
- B-side: "You Can Lie to Me Tonight"
- Released: January 28, 1985
- Genre: Country
- Length: 2:50
- Label: Epic
- Songwriter(s): Mickey James, Gayle Zeiler
- Producer(s): John Boylan

Mickey Gilley singles chronology
"Too Good to Stop Now" (1984)	"I'm the One Mama Warned You About" (1985)	"You've Got Something on Your Mind" (1985)

"I'm the One Mama Warned You About" is a song written by Mickey James and Gayle Zeiler, and recorded by American country music artist Mickey Gilley. It was released in January 1985 as the second and final single from his album Too Good to Stop Now. The song reached number 10 on the U.S. Billboard Hot Country Singles chart and number 10 on the Canadian RPM Country Tracks chart in Canada.

== Chart performance ==
Chart (1985)	Peak position
US Hot Country Songs (Billboard)	10
Canadian RPM Country Tracks	10
