= Don't the Girls All Get Prettier at Closing Time =

Single by Mickey Gilley

from the album Gilley's Smokin'
- B-side: "Where Do You Go to Lose a Heartache"
- Released: January 1976
- Recorded: 1975
- Genre: Country
- Length: 2:58
- Label: Playboy
- Songwriter(s): Baker Knight
- Producer(s): Eddie Kilroy

Mickey Gilley singles chronology
"Overnight Sensation" (1975)	"Don't the Girls All Get Prettier at Closing Time" (1976)	"Bring It On Home to Me" (1976)

"Don't the Girls All Get Prettier at Closing Time" is a song written by Baker Knight, and recorded by American country music artist Mickey Gilley. It was released in January 1976 as the first single from the album Gilley's Smokin. The song was Gilley's fifth No. 1 on the Billboard Hot Country Singles chart. The song's one week atop the chart was part of a 12-week stay in the country chart's top 40.

== Content ==
The song is a lament about loneliness and late-night desperation in finding a desirable significant other in a barroom. As the night progresses, and the singer consumes more drinks, he continuously lowers his standards. Eventually he finds a willing and (what he thinks to be) suitable partner—only to find that when he wakes up, he has taken home one of the ugliest women in the bar and vows never to "do that anymore."

It caught the attention of social psychologists who used scientific testing to investigate whether individuals begin to perceive the opposite gender as being more attractive as it gets later into the night. The phenomenon became known as the "closing time effect".

The alt-country supergroup The Pleasure Barons included a cover of the song on their Live in Las Vegas CD, with vocals by Dave Alvin.

== Charts ==
=== Weekly charts ===
Chart (1976)	Peak position
US Hot Country Songs (Billboard)	1
Canadian RPM Country Tracks	1

=== Year-end charts ===
Chart (1976)	Position
US Hot Country Songs (Billboard)	15
