= Doo-Wah Days =

Single by Mickey Gilley

from the album One and Only
- B-side: "After She's Gone"
- Released: July 14, 1986
- Genre: Country
- Length: 3:17
- Label: Epic
- Songwriter(s): Edward Hunnicutt, Doug Gilmore, Gary Vincent
- Producer(s): Norro Wilson, Mickey Gilley

Mickey Gilley singles chronology
"Your Memory Ain't What It Used to Be" (1985)	"Doo-Wah Days" (1986)	"Full Grown Fool" (1987)

"Doo-Wah Days" is a song written by Edward Hunnicutt, Doug Gilmore and Gary Vincent, and recorded by American country music artist Mickey Gilley. It was released in July 1986 as the only single from his album One and Only. The song reached number 6 on the U.S. Billboard Hot Country Singles chart and number 9 on the Canadian RPM Country Tracks chart in Canada.

== Chart performance ==
Chart (1986)	Peak position
US Hot Country Songs (Billboard)	6
Canadian RPM Country Tracks	9
