= Full Grown Fool =

Single by Mickey Gilley

from the album Back to Basics
- B-side: "To My One and Only"
- Released: April 4, 1987
- Genre: Country
- Length: 2:21
- Label: Epic
- Songwriter(s): Allen Reynolds, Susan Taylor
- Producer(s): Norro Wilson, Mickey Gilley

Mickey Gilley singles chronology
"Doo-Wah Days" (1986)	"Full Grown Fool" (1987)	"I'm Your Puppet" (1987)

"Full Grown Fool" is a song written by Allen Reynolds and Susan Taylor, and originally recorded by American country music artist Mickey Gilley on his 1985 album I Feel Good (About Lovin' You). Gilley re-recorded the song in 1987 and released it in April as the only single from the compilation album Back to Basics. The song reached #16 on the Billboard Hot Country Singles & Tracks chart.

== Chart performance ==
Chart (1987)	Peak position
US Hot Country Songs (Billboard)	16
Canadian RPM Country Tracks	18
