= Chains of Love (Mickey Gilley song) =

Single by Mickey Gilley

from the album First Class
- B-side: "1 Rock'n Roll C&W Boogie Blues Man"
- Released: October 1977
- Genre: Country
- Length: 2:36
- Label: Playboy
- Songwriter(s): Ahmet Nugetre, Harry VanWalls
- Producer(s): Eddie Kilroy

Mickey Gilley singles chronology
"Honky Tonk Memories" (1977)	"Chains of Love" (1977)	"The Power of Positive Drinkin'" (1978)

"Chains of Love" is a song written by Ahmet Nugetre and Harry VanWalls, and recorded by American country music artist Mickey Gilley. It was released in October 1977 as the third and final single from his album First Class. The song reached number 9 on the U.S. Billboard Hot Country Singles chart and number 7 on the Canadian RPM Country Tracks chart.

== Chart performance ==
Chart (1977–1978)	Peak position
US Hot Country Songs (Billboard)	9
Canadian RPM Country Tracks	7
