= Kekko Kamen =

Japanese manga series

- Cover of the first tankōbon volume of Kekko Kamen, as published by Shueisha in 1976

けっこう仮面 (Kekkō Kamen)
- Genre: Sex comedy
- Manga
- Written by: Go Nagai
- Published by: Shueisha
- Magazine: Monthly Shōnen Jump
- Original run: September 1974 – February 1978
- Volumes: 5
- Original video animation
- Directed by: Nobuhiro Kondo (ep 1); Shunichi Tokunaga (ep. 2); Kinji Yoshimoto (eps. 3-4)
- Written by: Masashi Sogo
- Music by: Keiju Ishikawa
- Studio: Studio Signal
- Licensed by: NA: ADV Films
- Released: August 1, 1991 – March 1, 1992
- Runtime: 25 minutes (each)
- Episodes: 4
- Live-action film
- Directed by: Hikari Hayakawa
- Produced by: Naokatsu Ito; Ken Urasaki
- Written by: Hikari Hayakawa
- Studio: Japan Home Video
- Released: March 22, 1991
- Runtime: 70 minutes
- Light novel

Shosetsu Kekko Kamen
- Written by: Masashi Sogo
- Illustrated by: Go Nagai
- Published by: Asahi Sonorama
- Imprint: Sonorama Bunko
- Published: May 1991
- Live-action film

Kekko Kamen 2: We'll be back...
- Directed by: Yutaka Akiyama
- Produced by: Naokatsu Ito
- Written by: Yutaka Akiyama
- Music by: Masaya Abe
- Studio: Japan Home Video
- Released: March 27, 1992
- Runtime: 80 minutes
- Live-action film

Kekko Kamen 3
- Directed by: Yutaka Akiyama
- Produced by: Naokatsu Ito; Toji Kato; Gunya Sachimori
- Written by: Yutaka Akiyama
- Music by: Masaya Abe
- Studio: Japan Home Video
- Released: April 23, 1993
- Runtime: 95 minutes
- Manga

Kekko Kamen P
- Written by: Shigemitsu Harada
- Illustrated by: Seiju Minato
- Published by: Kodansha
- Magazine: Weekly Young Magazine
- Original run: 2003 – 2004
- Volumes: 2
- Live-action film
- Directed by: Takafumi Nagamine
- Produced by: Shin Yoneyama; Shigeyuki Fukushima (associate producer); Junichi Matsushita (executive producer)
- Written by: Yuki Okano
- Music by: Mari Shimizu
- Studio: Art Port
- Licensed by: NA: Media Blasters
- Released: February 6, 2004
- Runtime: 70 minutes
- Live-action film

Kekko Kamen: Mangriffon no Gyakushu
- Directed by: Takafumi Nagamine
- Produced by: Shin Yoneyama; Shigeyuki Fukushima; Junichi Matsushita
- Written by: Yuki Okano; Keiichi Sakano
- Music by: Mari Shimizu
- Studio: Art Port
- Licensed by: NA: Media Blasters
- Released: July 23, 2004
- Runtime: 70 minutes
- Live-action film

Kekko Kamen Returns
- Directed by: Takafumi Nagamine
- Produced by: Shin Yoneyama; Shigeyuki Fukushima; Junichi Matsushita
- Written by: Yuki Okano
- Music by: Mari Shimizu
- Studio: Art Port
- Licensed by: NA: Media Blasters
- Released: October 31, 2004
- Runtime: 70 minutes
- Live-action film

Kekko Kamen Surprise
- Directed by: Takafumi Nagamine
- Produced by: Shin Yoneyama; Shigeyuki Fukushima; Junichi Matsushita
- Written by: Yuki Okano
- Music by: Mari Shimizu
- Studio: Art Port
- Licensed by: NA: Media Blasters
- Released: October 31, 2004
- Runtime: 70 minutes
- Live-action film

Kekko Kamen Royale
- Directed by: Kosuke Suzuki
- Produced by: Junichi Matsushita
- Written by: Rui Tsubota
- Music by: Koji Endo
- Studio: Art Port
- Released: May 25, 2007
- Runtime: 70 minutes
- Live-action film

Kekko Kamen Premium
- Directed by: Kosuke Suzuki
- Produced by: Junichi Matsushita
- Written by: Rui Tsubota
- Music by: Koji Endo
- Studio: Art Port
- Released: June 22, 2007
- Runtime: 75 minutes
- Live-action film

Kekko Kamen Forever
- Directed by: Kosuke Suzuki
- Produced by: Junichi Matsushita
- Written by: Rui Tsubota
- Music by: Koji Endo
- Studio: Art Port
- Released: July 27, 2007
- Runtime: 70 minutes
- Live-action film

Kekko Kamen Reborn
- Directed by: Nozomu Kasagi
- Produced by: Tatsuyuki Iizuka; Takeyuki Morikaku
- Written by: Kosuke Komatsu
- Studio: AMG Entertainment
- Released: June 2, 2012
- Runtime: 65 minutes

Kekko Kamen (Japanese: けっこう仮面, Hepburn: Kekkō Kamen) is a Japanese manga series written and illustrated by Go Nagai. It was serialized in Monthly Shōnen Jump from September 1974 to February 1978, with the chapters collected into five tankōbon volumes by Shueisha.

It follows the misadventures of a student named Mayumi Takahashi who attends a boarding school called Sparta Academy that is run by sadistic psychopaths. The teachers are constantly looking for ways to torture or humiliate the female students, and from this the teachers derive sexual satisfaction. Takahashi's only protection is from a mysterious, nude, female superhero—the titular Kekko Kamen. The manga has spawned an original video animation series and numerous live-action films. In North America, the OVAs were released by ADV Films, while several of the films were published by different distributors.

== Plot ==
First-year student Mayumi Takahashi attends a junior high school called Sparta Academy (スパルタ学園, Suparuta Gakuen), where the penalty for any student (usually girls) making the slightest mistake is being sexually humiliated by the perverted, corrupt and misogynistic teachers running the school, the principal being a demonic, jester-like villain named "Toenail of Satan". However, before the teachers can take their sexual advances too far, Kekko Kamen steps in and delivers a sound beating to the teachers, and usually performs a finishing attack by jumping into the air and landing crotch-first onto her opponent's face.

== Characters ==
Kekko Kamen (けっこう仮面, Kekkō Kamen)
A practically nude female superhero dressed only in a red, rabbit-eared mask, with matching gloves, scarf, and boots. She uses her body to distract the usually male enemy teachers that she fights in order to protect Sparta Academy's unfairly punished and harassed students, but, typically, she ends up coming to the defense of Mayumi Takahashi. She fights with a graceful and acrobatic martial arts style, as well as often using weapons to aid her, such as nunchuks and a bo staff. Her finishing move, the Oppiroge Jump (おっぴろげジャンプ; "Pubic Hair Jump"), involves her leaping into the air, spreading her legs, and landing groin-first on her typically male opponent's face, which knocks him out. The possibility of an outside intruder is ruled out, and the principal and faculty thus conclude that one of the students is the masked heroine.

In the last chapter, it is revealed that Kekko Kamen has six secret identities—the belief that she only had one allowed each of her secret identities to remain uncovered, whilst giving each other alibis. In the end, the six are victorious, and the school is shut down, thanks to their efforts.
Voiced by: Emi Shinohara (Japanese); Christine Auten (English)
Portrayed by: Chris Aoki

Mayumi Takahashi (高橋真弓, Takahashi Mayumi)
A first-year student at the Sparta Academy. Mayumi is an innocent and good-natured girl, but her failure to meet the school's high academic standards often lands her in the school's torture chamber, where she is subjected to humiliating punishments. However, before the teachers are about to completely violate her, Kekko Kamen always bursts in and saves the day. Her heroine's constant rescuing of her has filled Mayumi with a deep amount of affection for her, but she is often used by the principal and faculty as bait to lure Kekko Kamen into a trap.
Voiced by: Arisa Andō (Japanese); Monica Rial (English)
Portrayed by: Yumi Goto (1991 Movie), Rie Nakano (1992 Movie), Juri Inahara (2004 Movie)

Toenail of Satan (サタンの足の爪, Satan no Ashi no Tsume)
The main antagonist and wicked principal of Sparta Academy, who dresses in a fearsome white demon mask and jester hood. He is extremely perverted and obtains satisfaction from sexually humiliating the bodies of female students, especially that of Mayumi Takahashi. This brings him into conflict with Kekko Kamen, whose secret identity he wishes to uncover, so that he may destroy her. To accomplish this, he exhorts various punishment councillors into publicly humiliating Takahashi, using her as bait to bring the naked warrior of justice out in the open, but she always defeats him.

In the last chapter, after his defeat, his demon mask is finally removed. It is then revealed that his face is pretty much identical to the mask, including a birthmark in the shape of a foot with pointy toenails.
Voiced by: Jōji Yanami (Japanese); Rob Mungle (English)
Portrayed by: Paul Maki, Hajime Tsukumo

Teacher Ben (べン先生, Ben-sensei)
A perverted, insane, abusive, sadistic, mad scientist teacher who works for Toenail of Satan. He always punishes Mayumi Takahashi for her substandard grades, but is then put in his place by Kekko Kamen.
Voiced by: Mitsuaki Hoshino (Japanese); Chris Patton (English)

Chigusa Yuka (結花千草, Yūka Chigusa)
A shy, introverted second year student. When Mayumi sees her bare body during an examination intended to unmask Kekko Kamen, her reaction shows that she believes the heroine is Chigusa, but Kekko Kamen suddenly appears and declares that they suspected the wrong person. However, Chigusa actually does have a secret—she is actually two people, the twins Chigusa and Yuka, enrolling as one student due how poor their family is. When their secret is discovered, the twins are accused of being Kekko Kamen, and tortured, but are again cleared of suspicion when Kekko Kamen arrives to save them and Mayumi.

In the last chapter, however, it is revealed that the twins really were Kekko Kamen, alongside four others.
Voiced by: Kikuko Inoue (Japanese); Kira Vincent-Davis (English)

Keiko Natsuwata (夏綿けい子, Natsuwata Keiko)
A tough, popular Physical Education teacher, and an expert at various styles of fighting techniques, sports, and with many types of weapons—this caused the principal to suspect that she was actually Kekko Kamen, so he began to humiliate her. This ceased when Kekko Kamen jumped in to rescue her. She would come under suspicion of being Kekko Kamen more than once, and was accused of hiding Kekko Kamen's identity when her sister came under suspicion of being the heroine.

In the last chapter, it is revealed that she indeed was Kekko Kamen, alongside Chigusa, Yuka and three others.

Koichi Omote (面光一, Omote Kōichi)
A supposedly first year male student, who is in the same class as Mayumi. However, another student uncovered that "he" was actually a female in disguise. This prompted the Principal to believe that she was Kekko Kamen. When her true gender was unveiled, Keiko suddenly rushed in to save her, and confessed that she was Koichi's older sister. Both sisters were then tortured until Kekko Kamen came to their rescue. After this revelation, Koichi continued to be a valuable friend and ally of Mayumi. She, her sister, and Chigusa would come under suspicion again, but were proven innocent each time.

In the last chapter, she reveals herself to be Kekko Kamen, alongside her sister, the twins Chigusa and Yuka, and two others.

Ai Sakai (酒井愛, Sakai Ai)
A young student who is positively infatuated with Kekko Kamen, and is inspired to become a heroine of justice herself. So, armed with a rapier, she becomes the mostly nude, caped, swashbuckling hero with a ribbon covering her crotch known as Ribon no Shishi (リボンの獅子; "Ribbon Lion"). However, on her first attempt to combat the evil of the school, Ai finds herself in danger. Fortunately, Kekko Kamen comes to her rescue. After this incident, Ai continued to appear sporadically throughout the manga as a supporting character.

Kaori Wakatsuki (若月香織, Wakatsuki Kaori)
The very attractive school nurse. After Kekko Kamen's thigh is injured in a battle, the villain traces her to the infirmary, and confronts Kaori, ripping off her clothing in an attempt to find the scar, only to discover that it isn't there. Kekko Kamen appears, a bandage on her thigh, rescuing her, and eliminating her as a suspect.

In the last chapter, however, she is revealed to be Kekko Kamen, alongside Chigusa, Yuka, Keiko and Koichi.

Kei Kurenai (紅恵, Kurenai Kei)
A red-haired, chain smoking, tough-as-nails third-year student—she is a gang leader who makes sure everyone knows their place when dealing with her, and she hardly comes to class. When seeing Kei walk away from her, Mayumi is immediately reminded of someone else, but she quickly dismisses the thought.

Shortly afterwards, Mayumi is accosted by Toenail of Satan, and Kekko Kamen jumps in to save her, only to find herself in the midst of a trap. By the end of it, she is captured and unmasked—she is revealed to be Kei. She is then saved by Koichi, who reveals herself as Kekko Kamen—Chigusa, Yuka, Keiko and Kaori reveal themselves to be Kekko Kamen as well, and unite to defeat the Toenail of Satan and the faculty.

== Production ==
Kekko Kamen is a female superhero whose costume consists solely of red boots, gloves, scarf and a mask with long bunny-like ears. Her fighting style is graceful, and her finishing move involves driving the opponent to the ground with a flying headscissors takedown which presses her groin into the victim's face.

Kekko Kamen is a parody of Gekko Kamen. It was originally a joke that Nagai sent to his editor expecting him to reject it. His editor, however, loved the idea and that started Kekko Kamen. Even the name of the main antagonist is a parody: in Gekko Kamen it is Claw of Satan (サタンの爪, Satan no Tsume) while in Kekko Kamen it is Toenail of Satan (サタンの足の爪, Satan no Ashi no Tsume). The theme song for the Kekko Kamen character uses the same lyrics for the theme song to Moonlight Mask, but with changes.

== Media ==
=== Manga ===
Kekko Kamen was originally serialized in Shueisha's magazine Monthly Shōnen Jump, from September 1974 to February 1978.

The series has been compiled several times by Shueisha and other publishers. It is also available in ebook format, published by ebookjapan. The manga was published in two volumes in Italy by d/visual, on December 22, 2006, and July 30, 2010.

Shueisha (Jump Comics, 1976–1978)

Vol.	Release date	ISBN
1	April 30, 1976	978-4088526515
2	January 31, 1977	978-4088526522
3	July 31, 1977	978-4088526539
4	January 31, 1978	978-4088526546
5	July 31, 1978	978-4088526553

Shueisha (Jump Comics Deluxe, 1990)

Vol.	Release date	ISBN
1	August 15, 1990	978-4088583358
2	October 15, 1990	978-4088583365
3	December 9, 1990	978-4088583372

Kadokawa Shoten (Kadokawa Bunko, 1996)

Vol.	Release date	ISBN
1	April 25, 1996	978-4041978016
2	April 25, 1996	978-4041978023
3	April 25, 1996	978-4041978030

Kodansha (Kodansha Comics Deluxe, 2003)

Vol.	Release date	ISBN
1	July 4, 2003	978-4063347449

Leed Publishing (SP Comics, 2004)

Vol.	Release date	ISBN
1	April 27, 2004	978-4845828067
2	October 21, 2004	978-4845828173

=== Original video animation ===
A four-episode original video animation adaptation of Kekko Kamen was created by Studio Signal and released by Nippon Columbia on two VHS tapes in 1991 and 1992. A DVD collection was released on April 21, 2001. The first two episodes were directed by Nobuhiro Kondo and the second two by Kinji Yoshimoto. The opening theme song is "Kekko Kamen no Uta" (けっこう仮面の歌, Kekkō Kkamen no Uta; "The Song of Kekko Kamen") which Go Nagai wrote for the manga, with composition and arrangement by Keiju Ishikawa, and sung by Emi Shinohara. The ending theme is "Morodashi Heroine Kekko Kamen" (モロダシ・ヒロインけっこう仮面, Morodashi Hiroin Kekkō Kamen; "Naked Heroine Kekko Kamen") written by Hiroshi Koenji, composed and arranged by Keiju Ishikawa, and sung by Emi Shinohara.

The OVA series was released in the United States subtitled in English on two VHS tapes by ADV Films on February 7 and April 4, 1995. A single DVD version was produced on February 15, 2005, which beside the subtitles, also included dubbed English audio. ADV Films has also re-released Kekko Kamen in bundled DVD packages with other anime; Cutey Honey/Kekko Kamen on April 1, 2008, and Puni Puni Poemy/Kekko Kamen on April 21, 2009. The OVA was also released in a dubbed version in Italy on VHS by Dynamic Italia in 2000 under the name Kekko Kamen: La maschera libidinosa.

Episodes

No.	Title	Original release date	English release date
1	"Here I Am: The Messenger of Love and Justice!!"; Transliteration: "Ai to Seigi no Shisha Sanjō!!" (Japanese: 愛と正義の使者参上!!)	August 1, 1991	7 February 1995
2	"Crash!! Kekko Kamen vs Muscular Monster"; Transliteration: "Kekitotsu!! Kekkō Kamen vs Kinniku Monster" (Japanese: 激突!!けっこう仮面VS筋肉モンスター)	August 1, 1991	7 February 1995
3	"Mystery! The Legend of the Evil Android!!"; Transliteration: "Kaiki! Akuma no Jinzōningen Densetsu!!" (Japanese: 怪奇!悪魔の人造人間伝説!!)	March 1, 1992	4 April 1995
4	"Crisis! Kekko Kamen Only Lives Twice!!"; Transliteration: "Kiki Ippatsu! Kekkō Kamen wa Nido Shinu!!" (Japanese: 危機一発!けっこう仮面は二度死ぬ!!)	March 1, 1992	4 April 1995

=== Live-action films ===
There have been eleven live-action films based on Kekko Kamen. Go Nagai has been intricately involved in the production of the films. The first three movies and the three from 2006 were released in direct-to-video format, while films four through seven and eleven were theatrically released in Japan. The 2012 film was released theatrically in limited locations before being released on DVD after more than a month. The first four theatrical films were released on DVD in North American by Media Blasters' Tokyo Shock label beginning in 2005.

- First series, produced by Japan Home Video

- Kekko Kamen (けっこう仮面)(1991)
- Kekko Kamen 2 (けっこう仮面2)(1992)
- Kekko Kamen 3 (けっこう仮面3)(1993)

- Second series, produced by Art Port

- Kekko Kamen: Mask of Kekkou (けっこう仮面 MASK OF KEKKOU)(2003) also known in English as Kekko Kamen New
- Kekko Kamen: Mangriffon no Gyakushu (けっこう仮面 マングリフォンの逆襲)(2003) known in English as Kekko Kamen: The MGF Strikes Back
- Kekko Kamen Returns (けっこう仮面 RETURNS)(2004)
- Kekko Kamen Surprise (けっこう仮面 SURPRISE)(2004)

- Third series, produced by Art Port, starring Maria Ozawa

- Kekko Kamen Royale (けっこう仮面 ロワイヤル)(2006)
- Kekko Kamen Premium (けっこう仮面 プレミアム)(2006)
- Kekko Kamen Forever (けっこう仮面 フォーエバー)(2006)

- Fourth series, produced by AMG Entertainment, starring Aino Kishi

- Kekko Kamen Reborn (けっこう仮面 新生)(2012) also known as Mask The Kekkou Reborn

=== Sequels ===
Kekko Kamen P (けっこう仮面P, Kekkō Kamen P) is a manga series written by Shigemitsu Harada and illustrated by Seiju Minato and published in Weekly Young Magazine from 2003 to 2004. The chapters were collected into two tankōbon volumes by Kodansha on May 6 and July 6, 2004. It is a sequel to the original series, where several years have passed since the events depicted in the first manga. Momoka Nogami discovers the legend of the original Kekko Kamen and decides to emulate her actions donning a similar costume, adding a peach motif, and so she becomes Kekko Kamen Peach. Other Kekko also appear, Kekko Kamen Lemon and Kekko Kamen Melon, and even a male version called Kekko Kamen Banana.

A special story called "The Excellent - Kekko Kamen Gaiden" (THE エクセレント ～けっこう仮面外伝～), written by Shinobu Inokuma with co-operation from Nagai, was published in Business Jump in June 2011. It takes place many years after the original manga where a new Kekko Kamen, whose secret identity is a new teacher in a new school owned by the remaining factions of the Toenail of Satan, protects young female students from the evil members of the organisation unfortunately one of them catches her. She is held prisoner until the original Kekko Kamen rescues her and they both defeat him, with the original telling her successor that some of the remains of the Toenail of Satan may have spread all over the world and that she will keep on fighting alone but she was proud of her successor that if she's gone she and her successors after her will always protect the young female women from evil by using her namesake.

A one-shot crossover featuring Go Nagai's Kekko Kamen and Mazinger Z characters was written by Takeshi Okano and published in Grand Jump on January 16, 2013.

== Reception ==
Stig Høgset of Them Anime Reviews gave the Kekko Kamen OVAs two out of five stars, called the art passable, and clarified that while the jokes are smutty, they never get offensive.

Reviewing for Anime News Network, Theron Martin wrote "Kekko Kamen is great (if nonsensical) fun as long as you're an adult who can appreciate oodles of fan service and raunchy, sometimes utterly tasteless, humor." He cited the humor as a highlight, but felt the production values were mediocre.

Martin gave a much more negative review of the live action Kekko Kamen: Mask of Kekkou (also known as Kekko Kamen New), saying it came off as "exploitive and cruel rather than the campy, whimsical work it should have been." He called the writing amateurish and the acting even worse.

Angel Blade is a hentai parody OVA of Kekko Kamen produced in the Vanilla Series.

American heavy metal musician Rob Zombie used clips of the Kekko Kamen OVA during the 2010 Mayhem Festival and 2022 Freaks on Parade tours during the song "Never Gonna Stop (The Red Red Kroovy)".

== See also ==
- Kill la Kill
- Shimoneta
