= Das (studio) =

Japanese adult video company

DAS
- Industry: Pornography
- Founded: 2007
- Headquarters: Tokyo, Japan
- Products: Pornographic films
- Parent: Hokuto Corporation
- Website: http://www.dasdas.jp

DAS (ダスッ！, Dasu!) is a Japanese adult video (AV) production company located in Tokyo, Japan.

== Company information ==
DAS is part of Japan's largest group of AV companies, the Hokuto Corporation, located in Ebisu, Tokyo. DAS specializes in simulated rape, bukkake, nakadashi (creampie) and humiliation videos using well-known actresses. The company was founded in 2007 and released its first four videos on April 25, 2007. These videos starred Maria Ozawa, Rin Suzuka, Reina Matsushima and Rin Aoki, four actresses who moved to the new company from another Hokuto Corporation company, S1 No. 1 Style.

DAS releases a total of about four original and compilation videos per month. The studio uses product codes beginning with "DASD" for their original videos and "DAZD" for compilation works. As of April 2014, the latest videos were DASD-250 and DAZD-057. The DMM website, the distribution arm for companies in the Hokuto Corporation, listed more than 200 DVDs under the DAS studio name in September 2011. The company also releases videos in the Blu-ray format. In March 2010 DAS announced the debut of a new label "Platinum" (プラチナ, Purachina).

DAS was one of the 22 companies which participated in the 2007 Vegas Night Awards sponsored by Hokuto and was also one of the 37 studios at the 2008 Moodyz Awards.

== AV Grand Prix ==
DAS nominated works for both the 2008 and 2009 AV Grand Prix competition. Their 2008 entry was Anal Sex Real Nakadashi (肛門性交生中出し 小澤マリア) starring Maria Ozawa and directed by Hokusai. The 2009 submission, The QUEEN of DAS!, was a compilation video of scenes of earlier works by Maria Ozawa. The title won the Best Violence Video Award.

== Actresses ==
Actresses who have appeared in videos for DAS include:

- Rin Aoki
- Hikari Hino
- Bunko Kanazawa
- Reina Matsushima
- Yuka Osawa
- Maria Ozawa
- Asami Sugiura
- Hitomi Tanaka
- Maki Tomoda
