= Kacey Jones =

American singer-songwriter, producer and humorist

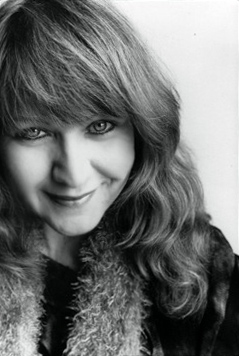
- Kacey Jones in 2007

Background information
- Born: Gail Zeiler; April 27, 1950; Gilroy, California, U.S.
- Died: September 1, 2016 (aged 66) Nashville, Tennessee, U.S.
- Genres: Country music; comedy
- Occupations: Musician; singer-songwriter; producer; publisher
- Instruments: Vocals; guitar
- Labels: MCA Records; Curb Records; Kinkajou Records; IGO Records

Gail Zeiler (April 27, 1950 – September 1, 2016), known professionally as Kacey Jones, was an American singer-songwriter, producer and humorist. After co-writing the Mickey Gilley hit "I'm the One Mama Warned You About" (credited as Gayle Zeiler), she found success as a performer through the band Ethel & The Shameless Hussies, with whom she released her first album. Later, in 1997, she released her first solo album, Men Are Some of My Favorite People, through Curb Records, before founding her own label, IGO Records, co-founding the Kinkajou Records label with Kinky Friedman and creating two publishing houses—Zamalama Music and Mamalama Music. Since her first solo album, Jones released eight albums and produced music for both the theatrical comedy Nipples to the Wind and the movie (and TV series) Sordid Lives.

== Career ==
Born Gail Zeiler in Gilroy, California, she won the Northern California edition of the Wrangler Country Starsearch in 1981 and became an Equa recording artist. Jones found initial success recording with an independent label in San Francisco before moving to Nashville, Tennessee, in 1986. Her move to Nashville came after she co-wrote "I'm the One Mama Warned You About", recorded by Mickey Gilley on Epic Records. The song reached number 5 on the Billboard charts. Her original song, "Cold Turkey," was recorded that same year by David Allan Coe on CBS Records.

Jones moved to Nashville with expectations of being signed to a major record label as a serious singer-songwriter rather than writing humorous works. That changed when she recruited Becki Fogle and Valerie Hunt to form Ethel & The Shameless Hussies. Jones performed as Ethel Beaverton, and the group soon gained a contract with MCA Records, recording the album Born To Burn in 1988. The group stayed together for four years and were nominated for Comedy Act of the Year in the Music City News Awards. After moving on from the Shameless Hussies, Jones became involved in a number of different projects. As a record producer she developed Pearls in the Snow – The Songs of Kinky Friedman. The album featured artists such as Willie Nelson, Asleep at the Wheel, and Lyle Lovett performing songs by Friedman, and it went on to reach the number 1 spot on the Americana radio chart in 1999. While working with Kinky Friedman on the album, Jones and Friedman founded the Kinkajou Records label. Later she established her own independent label, IGO (Irritating Gentile Optimist) Records, for whom she signed artists such as Leland Martin. She was the President of two publishing houses: Zamalama Music (BMI) and Mamalama Music (ASCAP).

As a recording artist and performer, Jones signed with Curb Records in 1997. This led to her first solo album, Men Are Some of My Favorite People (1997). Other albums by Jones were to follow on her own label, IGO Records including Every Man I Love Is Either Married, Gay or Dead (2000), (produced after completing the project with Kinky Friedman), Never Wear Panties to a Party (2001), "The Sweet Potato Queens' Big-Ass Box of Music" (2003), "Nipples to the Wind" (2007), and the more recent Donald Trump's Hair (2009). Donald Trump's Hair, reached No. 1 on ReverbNation's comedy charts. In addition, Kacey Jones Sings Mickey Newbury, a tribute to Mickey Newbury (who influenced her early career), was released in 2006, and gave her an opportunity to explore the more serious side of her singing.

== Illness and death ==
In 2013, Jones was diagnosed with colorectal cancer and only chose alternative cancer treatments to fight her condition. She died on September 1, 2016, while in hospice care at her Nashville home, at 66 years of age.

== Discography ==
- She's Goin' Home Alone (2:49); producers: Bob Saponti/Jerry Shook; writer: Gail Zeiler (1981)
- It Ain't My Concern (1981)
- No Place to Hide (1981)
- Born To Burn (1988) with Ethel & The Shameless Hussies.
- Men Are Some of My Favorite People (1997)
- Every Man I Love Is Either Married, Gay or Dead (2000)
- Never Wear Panties to a Party (2001)
- The Sweet Potato Queens' Big-Ass Box of Music (2003)
- Every Man I Love Is Either Married, Gay or Dead – Live (2005)
- Kacey Jones Sings Mickey Newbury (2006)
- Nipples to the Wind (2007)
- Kaceyoke – Volume 1 (2008)
- Donald Trump's Hair (2009)
- Amen for Old Friends (2014)
