= Nozomu Kasagi =

Japanese film director

Nozomu Kasagi (笠木 望, Kasagi Nozomu; born 1974 in Hokkaido, Japan) is a Japanese film director.

== Career ==
Kasagi started creating independent films while he was a student at Sophia University in Tokyo. His early work was screened at various film festivals, including the Akiruno Film Festival, the Sotsuseisai, Kyoto International Student Film & Video Festival, the Tsutaya Indies Movie Festival, Planet Film Festival, and Mito Short Film Festival.

In 2002, Kasagi made his debut as a film director with “Swan's Song,” which was based on SATO Sakichi’s screenplay.

During his career, Kasagi has since been active in various genres, directing: TV drama series, such as “Ganso: Shonan-wara-yane Monogatari” [lit. The Original Shonan Tiled Roof Stories], starring TERAJIMA Susumu and TSUDA Kanji; music videos for artists such as HAYASHIBARA Megumi and Seikima-II; stage plays, such as his modern version of “A Streetcar Named Desire,” starring ASANO Tadanobu and AIKAWA Sho; and films, such as “Tokyo Real” based on the Shueisha Publishing Company's bestselling cell phone novel.

In 2019, he directed the drama comedy film “Bullet Trip,” bringing home a Special Jury Award and Japan's first ever Best Foreign Language Film Award at the WorldFest-Houston International Film Festival.

== Filmography ==
- Kimi no Jaaji wa Doko [lit: Where is your tracksuit?] (2001)
- Swan's Song (2002)
- Tokyo Real (2007)
- Tokyo Species (2012)
- Kekko Kamen (2012)
- Top (2014)
- Cherī Fujin [lit. Lady Cherry] (2015)
- Bullet Trip (2019)
- Death in Tokyo (2021)
