= Tokyo Species =

- Directed by: Nozomu Kasagi
- Produced by: Alfredo Azucena jr
- Starring: rir aka ken
- Release date: 3 February 2012
- Running time: 70 minutes
- Country: Japan
- Language: Japanese

Tokyo Species (TOKYOスピーシーズ) is a 2012 Japanese erotic horror V-cinema release directed by Nozomu Kasagi and starring AV Idol Maria Ozawa. It was described by critics as a low-budget Japanese version of the 1995 American film Species.

== Plot ==
Michiko, a high school student commits suicide after being bullied, and her dead body is taken over by an alien parasite that starts to mate with several men before killing them.

Meanwhile, Michiko's friend Rika is approached by Mayumi, a student serving as host for a benevolent alien and both girls join forces to stop Michiko.

== Cast ==
- Maria Ozawa
- Marika Minami
- Manami Mizuse
- Namiko
- Kazunori Kobayashi
- Tomonori Kouno
- Shigeo Ōsako
- Yuri Akikawa

== Release ==
This feature was released on DVD in Japan as TOKYOスピーシーズ in February 2012.
