= Jojon =

Indonesian comedian (1947–2014)

- Born: Djuhri Masdjan; 5 June 1947; Karawang, West Java, Indonesia
- Died: 6 March 2014 (aged 66); Jakarta, Indonesia
- Other name: Ayah Opa Jojon
- Occupations: Actor, comedian
- Years active: 1975–2014
- Spouses: Iin Sina; Henny Mariana
- Children: 8

Djuhri Masdjan, better known as Jojon, (5 June 1947 – 6 March 2014), was a veteran Indonesian comedian. A one-time member of the Jayakarta group, along with Cahyono and Uuk, he was easily recognized by his Adolf Hitler/Charlie Chaplin look alike Toothbrush moustache. After becoming a solo act, he played a significant supporting role on many TV shows such as SBY and Kerajaan Sahur.

== Death ==
He died in the early hours of 6 March 2014 from a heart attack at the age of 66.

== Filmography ==
- Tiga Dara Mencari Cinta
- Oke Boss
- Apa Ini, Apa Itu
- Vina Bilang Cinta
