= A Headache Tomorrow (Or a Heartache Tonight) =

Single by Mickey Gilley

from the album That's All That Matters to Me
- B-side: "Million Dollar Memories"
- Released: January 1981
- Genre: Country
- Length: 3:32
- Label: Epic
- Songwriter(s): Chick Rains
- Producer(s): Jim Ed Norman

Mickey Gilley singles chronology
"That's All That Matters" (1980)	"A Headache Tomorrow (Or a Heartache Tonight)" (1981)	"You Don't Know Me" (1981)

"A Headache Tomorrow (Or a Heartache Tonight)" is a song written by Chick Rains, and recorded by American country music artist Mickey Gilley. It was released in January 1981 as the second single from the album That's All That Matters to Me. The song was Gilley's eleventh number one hit on the country chart. The single stayed at number one for a single week and spent a total of twelve weeks on the country chart.

== Charts ==
Chart (1981)	Peak position
US Hot Country Songs (Billboard)	1
Canadian RPM Country Tracks	1
