= Invitation Only (Mickey Gilley album) =

Studio album by Mickey Gilley
- Released: May 20, 2003
- Recorded: 1991
- Genre: Country
- Length: 32:16
- Label: Varèse Sarabande
- Producer: Larry Butler; Cary E. Mansfield; Sandy Brokaw; Matthew Miles

Mickey Gilley chronology
| Room Full of Roses/Gilley's Smokin' (2003) | Invitation Only (2003) | 16 Biggest Hits (2003) |

Professional ratings
Review scores
| Source | Rating |
|---|---|
| Allmusic | 3/5 stars |
| Amazon | 4.5/5 stars |

Invitation Only is an album by American country music singer Mickey Gilley. This album was released on May 20, 2003, on the Varèse Sarabande label.

== Track listing ==
1. "If I Didn't Know Your Memory Loved Jamaica" – 3:37
2. "All I've Got Against Him Is You" – 3:44
3. "Dancing to the Beat of a Broken Heart" – 3:28
4. "Keep the Night Away" – 3:24
5. "Invitation Only" – 3:22
6. "All Night Long" – 2:51
7. "Sadly Ever After" – 3:08
8. "Sure Got This Old Redneck Feeling Blue" – 2:57
9. "God's Country" – 4:08
10. "Under a Blue Moon Tonight" – 3:37
