= Too Good to Stop Now (song) =

Single by Mickey Gilley

from the album Too Good to Stop Now
- B-side: "Shoulder to Cry On"
- Released: August 1984
- Genre: Country
- Length: 3:25
- Label: Epic
- Songwriter(s): Bob McDill, Rory Bourke
- Producer(s): John Boylan

Mickey Gilley singles chronology
"You've Really Got a Hold on Me" (1984)	"Too Good to Stop Now" (1984)	"I'm the One Mama Warned You About" (1985)

"Too Good to Stop Now" is a song written by Bob McDill and Rory Bourke, and recorded by American country music artist Mickey Gilley. It was released in August 1984 as the first single and title track from his album Too Good to Stop Now. The song reached #4 on the Billboard Hot Country Singles chart in December 1984 and #1 on the RPM Country Tracks chart in Canada.

== Chart performance ==
Chart (1984)	Peak position
US Hot Country Songs (Billboard)	4
Canadian RPM Country Tracks	1

== Other versions ==
- John Schneider recorded this song on his 1984 album of the same name.
