= Overnight Sensation (song) =

Single by Mickey Gilley

from the album Overnight Sensation
- B-side: "I'll Sail My Ship Again"
- Released: December 1975
- Genre: Country
- Length: 2:45
- Label: Playboy
- Songwriter: Bob McDill
- Producer: Eddie Kilroy

Mickey Gilley singles chronology
| "Roll You Like a Wheel" (1975) | "Overnight Sensation" (1975) | "Don't the Girls All Get Prettier at Closing Time" (1976) |

"Overnight Sensation" is a song written by Bob McDill, and recorded by American country music artist Mickey Gilley. It was released in December 1975 as the second and final single and title track from Gilley's album Overnight Sensation. The song reached number 7 on the Billboard Hot Country Singles chart and number 4 on the RPM Country Tracks chart in Canada.

== Content ==
The song tells the story of a woman who is irresistible to men.

== Chart performance ==
| Chart (1975–1976) | Peak position |
|---|---|
| US Hot Country Songs (Billboard) | 7 |
| Canadian RPM Country Tracks | 4 |
