= Attackers =

Japanese adult video production company

- Industry: Pornography
- Founded: 1996
- Headquarters: Tokyo, Japan
- Key people: Michio Maruyama (丸山道央)
- Products: Pornographic films
- Parent: Hokuto Corporation
- Website: http://www.attackers.net

Attackers (アタッカーズ, Atakkaazu) is a Japanese adult video (AV) production company located in Tokyo, Japan.

== History ==
Attackers started as an independent ("indie") studio but is now one of the companies that make up the large AV group, the Hokuto Corporation, which distributes Attackers video products through their DMM website. The Attackers studio released its first four videos (with themes of sexual violence and rape) in February 1997 on the Shark label numbered SHK-001 to SHK-004. Among early Attackers stars performing on the Shark label in the late 1990s were AV Idols Sally Yoshino, Kyōko Kazama and Yuri Komuro.

The studio also started another imprint, IdeaPocket, to market its softer Angel series of cosplay videos which were first released in December 1998 including one, Angel 9, which starred Sally Yoshino. IdeaPocket later split off to become an independent company, moving on to produce over 6000 movies.

The company specializes in videos portraying simulated rape, torture and bondage. The two main bondage genre labels are Jabaku (蛇縛) and Ryubaku (龍縛). The Jabaku series often stars well-known actresses and uses high production values and elaborate sets. The emphasis is on bondage and gagging with some light S&M. The Ryubaku label was introduced in 2000 as a softer version of the Jabaku line with more consensual action and fantasy role-playing.

The studio usually releases a total of about 10-15 original and compilation videos per month and by September 2011, the AV distributor DMM (a division of the Hokuto Corporation) listed over 1500 Attackers titles in their catalog. The general manager of the company is Michio Maruyama (丸山道央). Directors who have worked with the Attackers studio include [Jo]Style, Eitaro Haga and others.

== Series ==
The company's "Les Noir" series consisted of 5 original videos released from December 2005 to March 2007 on the Attackers Inmad label plus a compilation video from July 2007 on the Attackers Best label. All dealt with lesbian sadomasochism and bondage (BDSM) themes and all starred Sakura Sakurada as a dominant woman forcing young girls into lesbian acts. All five videos were directed by former AV actress Yui Koike (小池ゆい).

Its "Slave Island" series began in December 2005 with the release of Slave Island (龍縛監禁凌辱スペシャル 奴隷島) on the Attackers Ryubaku label (RBD-045). The video, starring Syuri Himesaki, Ryoko Mizusaki & Kyōko Kazama, and directed by Kenzo Nagira, won the Attackers Award at the 2005 Moodyz Awards. A total of 12 original "Slave Island" videos were released between December 2005 and February 2008, all under the Attackers Ryubaku label. Two 8-hour compilation works were also released in October 2008 under the Attackers Best label. The plots involve girls being kidnapped by bogus recruiters and brought to an island where they are imprisoned and turned into sex slaves. The films depict a mixture of bondage, humiliation, simulated rape, forced fellatio and urination involving both lesbian and heterosexual sex.

== Moodyz Awards ==
Beginning in 2004, Attackers took part in the annual December Moodyz Awards. In 2004 and 2005 the studio presented separate awards to its own staff but from 2006 they have taken part in the general awards process with several other Hokuto Corporation companies. These companies include DMM.com, R18.com, S1 No. 1 Style, among others.

== AV Grand Prix ==
Attackers was one of the studios participating in the 2008 AV Grand Prix with the video Female Ninja Torture Rape 3 (くノ一拷問凌辱3 椿姫・極秘輿入ノ章) [AVGL-002] starring Rin Aoki, Megu Ayase & Rin Hayakawa, and directed by Katsuyuki Hasegawa.

For the 2009 AV Grand Prix, the studio nominated the video Young Female Student Confinement Rape - Brute Gang Rape (女子高生監禁凌辱 鬼畜輪姦 レイプの傷痕) [AVGL-102] with Yuuka Kokoro, Mari Hida, Kasumi, Rin Agazuma & Hiyori Wakakusa, and directed by HiroA.
