= Invitation Only (film) =

- Theatrical release poster
- Directed by: Kevin Ko
- Written by: Sung In; Carolyn Lin
- Produced by: Michelle Yeh; Maxx Tsai
- Starring: Ray Chang; Jerry Huang; Julianne Chu; Maria Ozawa
- Cinematography: James Yuan
- Edited by: Kevin Ko; Henry Wei
- Music by: Cody Westheimer
- Production company: Three Dots Entertainment
- Distributed by: Warner Bros. Pictures
- Release date: April 17, 2009
- Running time: 95 minutes
- Country: Taiwan
- Languages: Mandarin; English
- Box office: US$30,798

Invitation Only (絕命派對 or Jue ming pai dui) is a Taiwanese horror film directed by Kevin Ko and released in April 2009. The film was billed as "Taiwan's First-Ever Slasher Horror".

== Plot ==
Wade Chen, who works for a rich and powerful CEO, Mr. Yang, accidentally sees his boss having sex with supermodel Dana. His boss supposedly rewards him by sending him to an exclusive party on company money. Wade's evening at the party includes receiving a new car, dancing, gambling and sex with the boss' mistress Dana. However, leaving the party is a problem and the guests are systematically hunted down and slaughtered by a masked slasher.

== Cast ==
- Ray Chang as Wade Chen
- Jerry Huang as Mr. Yang
- Julianne Chu as Hitomi
- Maria Ozawa as Dana
- Kristian Brodie as Warren
- Joseph Ma as Lin
- Kao Yin-Hsuan as Richard Kao
- Vivian Hsu as Holly

== Production ==
Invitation Only marks the debut film for director Kevin Ko. A Love HK Film article describes the production as a "low-budget affair; the film was shot on high-def and the art direction is only a step up from 'converted warehouse'".

== Release ==
The film was released theatrically in Taiwan on April 17, 2009, and in Hong Kong on June 18, 2009. Invitation Only was also released on DVD with English subtitles in 2009.

== Reception ==
Invitation Only was received relatively poorly. Love HK Film wrote that it is "another film following in the footsteps of the "torture porn" vogue" and that it is an "entertaining if unremarkable thriller". China Post said it is for horror-fans only and that any "merit or message in “Invitation Only” is washed away in the crimson tide of bloodletting that it unleashes". Ho Yi at the Taipei Times was more positive, calling it a "90-minute ride of guilty thrills that combines graphic violence, repulsive torture and sexually suggestive imagery with bitter commentary on a wealth-obsessed society."
