= Ade Juwita =

Indonesian transgender comedian

Ade Juwita (12 June 1965 – 6 November 2015) was an Indonesian transgender comedian.

== Personal life ==
Ade was born on 5 May 1966 in Sorong from Maria Valentina Inanosa as mother and Stefanus Ateta as father. She was the third child from 4 siblings. Raised as male, she enjoyed playing with dolls and house, activities she considered feminine since primary school. In middle school, she began to apply makeup to appear more womanly. By high school, she was attracted to men, a fact her parents discovered, leading them to beat her.

== Career ==
Ade started gaining recognition in 1991 when she acted as Juwita, a sissy character, in Lenong Rumpi, a sitcom movie which led to her being known as Ade Juwita. In the same year, she also appeared in Catatan Si Emon, romantic comedy movie. She continued her acting in Lenong Rumpi 2 as sequel of the previous film in 1992. On 2013, she returned acting as Juwita on Dendam Arwah Rel Bintaro, a horror comedy movie. She was also act as one of the ghost who speak with Betawi accent and keeps seduce passing people in Si Manis Jembatan Ancol, horror comedy television series on 1993 with Debby Sahertian, Harry De Fretes and Robby Tumewu.

== Death ==
Ade, suffering from gastritis and a swollen lymph node in her neck, returned to Sorong from Jakarta in May 2015. She had decided to stop working in Jakarta due to less work available in there and the potential work in Raja Ampat which near to Sorong. After spending one week hospitalized in Pertamina Sorong Hospital, followed by one week in Kasih Herlina Hospital, and then three weeks in Regional Hospital Sorong, she was died on 6 November 2015 and was buried on Public Cemetery Rufei on 9 November 2015.

== Filmography ==
=== Film ===
Year	Title	Role	Note
1991	Catatan Si Emon		
1991	Lenong Rumpi	Juwita	
1992	Lenong Rumpi II	Juwita	
2013	Dendam Arwah Rel Bintaro		

=== Television series ===
Year	Title	Role
	Oke Oke Bos	
1995	Opera Odol	
1995-1999	Mariam Si Manis Jembatan Ancol 2	Juwita
