= Dono =

Dono may refer to:

- -dono, a Japanese honorific suffix
- Dono (comedian) (1951–2001), Indonesian comedian and actor
