= Bill Rice =

American singer-songwriter (1939–2023)

- Born: Wilburn Steven Rice; April 19, 1939; Datto, Arkansas, U.S.
- Died: October 28, 2023 (aged 84) Merritt Island, Florida, U.S.
- Genres: Country
- Occupation: Singer-songwriter
- Instrument: Vocals
- Years active: 1963–2023
- Labels: Capitol, Epic, Polydor

Wilburn Steven "Bill" Rice (April 19, 1939 – October 28, 2023) was an American country music singer and songwriter. Rice charted six singles between 1971 and 1978, including the Top 40 hit "Travelin' Minstrel Man", but is better known for his songwriting. Rice has written songs for artists such as Johnny Paycheck, Reba McEntire, Lynn Anderson, Charley Pride, and Jerry Lee Lewis. He has more awards from the American Society of Composers, Authors and Publishers than any other songwriter. Rice had also been nominated for two Grammy Awards.

== Biography ==
Wilburn Steven Rice was born on April 19, 1939. He learned to play guitar at age fourteen and was signed to his first recording contract at age 18. In 1960, he had his first cut as a songwriter when Elvis Presley recorded "Girl Next Door Went A-Walking".

Rice met songwriter Jerry Foster while on tour and began collaborating with him. The two wrote songs together and were signed to a songwriting contract through the assistance of "Cowboy" Jack Clement. Some of the earliest songs they wrote were "Big Big City" and "Quarter Mile Rows", which were both recorded by singer-pianist Moon Mullican. Their writing partnership has been hugely successful with many dozens of charting hits from the late 1960s to early 1980s. Two of his cuts received Grammy Award nominations: "Back Side of Dallas" by Jeannie C. Riley and "Here Comes the Hurt Again" by Mickey Gilley. He had also received 73 awards from the American Society of Composers, Authors and Publishers (ASCAP), the most received by any songwriter. In 1974, Rice had eleven cuts on the country music charts at the same time.

Rice charted six singles as a recording artist in the 1970s; five singles charted as a solo artist in 1971–1972, and one charted as a duet with then-labelmate Lois Johnson titled "All the Love We Threw Away" in 1977. His first Capitol release, "Travelin' Minstrel Man", peaked at number 33 on Hot Country Songs in 1971.

In the 1980s to mid-1990s, Rice also had a very successful songwriting partnership with his then-wife, Sharon Vaughn (under her married name Sharon Rice or Mary S. Rice).

Among the songs that Rice has written include "Someone to Give My Love To" by Johnny Paycheck, "Lonely Too Long" by Patty Loveless, "I'll Think of Something" by Hank Williams, Jr. (later covered by Mark Chesnutt), "I'm Not That Lonely Yet" by Reba McEntire, "Would You Take Another Chance on Me" by Jerry Lee Lewis, and "Wonder Could I Live There Anymore" by Charley Pride.

Rice lived in Florida. He died in Merritt Island on October 28, 2023, at the age of 84.

== Discography ==
Year	Single	Chart Positions
Year	Single	US Country
1971	"Travelin' Minstrel Man"	33
1971	"Honky-Tonk Stardust Cowboy"	51
1972	"A Girl Like Her Is Hard to Find"	74
1972	"Something to Call Mine"	63
1977	"All the Love We Threw Away" (with Lois Johnson)	97
1978	"Beggars and Choosers"	100
1985	"'Til a Tear Becomes a Rose"	35
