= Eddie Kilroy =

- Born: Dave Moore
- Origin: Liberty, Texas, USA
- Genres: Country, Countrypolitan
- Occupation: record producer
- Years active: 35
- Website: eddiekilroy.com

Eddie Kilroy is a country music producer. Currently he has a show on XM Satellite Radio's Willie's Place.

== Early life ==
Alva Dave Moore who later took the stage name Eddie Kilroy when he was a disc jockey in Houston, was born in Louisiana, and, as he describes his early life, he was "surrounded by cowboys". Thus by the time he was ten he had decided to make a living as a cowboy, and, with the support of his father, Kilroy successfully took part in youth and high school rodeos, eventually entering the professional circuit. Along with horse riding, Kilroy had picked up some skills with the guitar, and this had led him into song writing and local performances.

While in Arkansas, Kilroy decided to make the trip to Nashville in order to give the music business a try. With horses in tow, he unsuccessfully tried pitching his music to Chet Atkins, only to discover that "you needed an appointment and they didn't care I had two horses in their parking lot". Kilroy noticed that Faron Young's offices were nearby, and thus he made a second attempt. Young was not impressed by the music, but recommended that Kilroy move to Nashville and continue writing, reportedly stating that "Every time you write a song, I want you to bring it over here and sing it to me."

Although he did not immediately take Young's advice, choosing instead to return to the rodeo circuit, in the early 1960s Kilroy decided to follow Young's suggestion and moved to Nashville in order to pursue a career in the music industry.

== Career ==
After moving to Nashville, Kilroy gained a position as a producer at Mercury Records. Kilroy's first studio record, produced in 1968, proved to be a hit for Jerry Lee Lewis — and made Kilroy the "one man responsible" for changing the fortunes of Jerry Lee Lewis' flagging career. Kilroy suggested that Lewis record "Another Place, Another Time" with a more modern country sound, and the record kick-started Lewis's late 1960s career revival. Kilroy also continued with Faron Young's offer, and eventually Young recorded "Pen and Paper", with music and lyrics by Eddie Kilroy and Diane Blalock Kilroy through Mercury Records. Kilroy was a producer at Westpark Records in the early 1970s, and became president of Playboy Records when he founded the label for Hugh Hefner, for whom he signed Mickey Gilley. He recorded "Roomful of Roses" in 1974 with Mickey Gilley, and the album became a number one country western hit – Gilley went on to create six number one albums with Playboy. From there Kilroy moved to become the co-president of the MCA Nashville Records office. While at MCA Kilroy signed Faron Young to the label and produced two albums with Young: Chapter Two (1979) and Free and Easy (1980). In 1981 Eddie produced Louise Mandrell & RC Bannon on RCA records.

Eddie Kilroy went independent after leaving MCA, and as an independent he produced the last album by Marty Robbins.

== Awards ==
- 2007 Academy of Western Artists Awards, disc jockey, major market.

== Credits ==
- Two awards for "Producer of The Year" from The Academy of Country Music
- Lifetime member of The Academy of Country Music
- Producer of the year for ASCAP
- Producer of the year Record World Magazine
