= Mickey Gilley =

American musician (1936–2022)

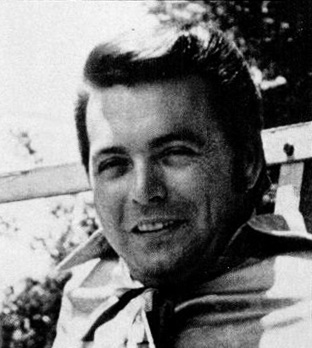
- Gilley in 1970

Background information
- Born: Mickey Leroy Gilley; March 9, 1936; Natchez, Mississippi, U.S.
- Died: May 7, 2022 (aged 86) Branson, Missouri, U.S.
- Genres: Country; countrypolitan; country rock
- Occupations: Singer; musician
- Instruments: Vocals; piano
- Years active: 1957–2022
- Labels: Astro; Dot; Paula; Playboy; Epic; Branson; Varèse Sarabande; TAP Music
- Spouses: Geraldine Garrett (m. 1953; div. 1961) Vivian McDonald (m. 1963; died 2019)
- Website: www.gilleys.com

Mickey Leroy Gilley (March 9, 1936 – May 7, 2022) was an American country music singer, businessman, actor, and musician.

Among his hits are "Room Full of Roses", "Don't the Girls All Get Prettier at Closing Time", and "Lonely Nights". Gilley charted 42 singles in the top 40 on the US Country chart. His cover of "Stand by Me" was used in the movie Urban Cowboy and his nightclub in Pasadena, Texas appeared in the movie. He was a cousin of Jerry Lee Lewis, Carl McVoy, and Jimmy Swaggart.

== Biography ==
=== Early life and the rise to fame ===
Gilley was born March 9, 1936, to Arthur Fillmore Gilley (November 27, 1897 – February 2, 1982) and Irene Gilley (née Lewis; September 11, 1900 – August 14, 1985) in Natchez, Mississippi.

For many years, Gilley lived in the shadow of his well-known cousin, Jerry Lee Lewis, a successful singer and musician in the 1950s and early 1960s. Gilley grew up in Louisiana, just across the Mississippi River from where Lewis grew up. Gilley's family moved to the east side of Houston, Texas, in the 1940s, where he attended Galena Park High School. He was primarily a guitarist at the time and took his guitar to school to entertain classmates.

They sang both boogie-woogie and gospel music, but Gilley did not become a professional singer until Lewis hit the top of the charts in the 1950s. Gilley then cut a few singles and played sessions in New Orleans with producer Huey P. Meaux. His record "Call Me Shorty" on the Dot label sold well in 1958. In the 1960s, he played at many clubs and bars, gaining a following at the Nesadel Club in Pasadena, Texas. Paula Records released Gilley's first album, Down the Line, in 1967. He had a minor hit from the album called "Now I Can Live Again".

In 1970, Gilley joined in a partnership with Sherwood Cryer. Sherwood owned the club under the name Shelly's. His first nightclub in Pasadena, Texas, was called Gilley's Club. It later became known as the "world's biggest honky-tonk". Gilley's Club and its mechanical bull were portrayed in the 1980 film, Urban Cowboy. He shared Gilley's Club with Sherwood Cryer, who asked Gilley to reopen his former bar with him. The club portion of Gilley's burned in 1990.

=== Recording career in the 1970s before Urban Cowboy ===
In 1974, just for fun, Gilley recorded a cover of "Room Full of Roses", written by Tim Spencer of the Sons of the Pioneers, which was a hit for George Morgan. Gilley's version was released by Astro Records, but Playboy Records obtained national distribution on it and Gilley was signed to Playboy Records, working with his long-time friend Eddie Kilroy. "Room Full of Roses" made Gilley a star, hitting the very top of the Country charts that year, as well as making it to No. 50 on the pop chart.

He had a string of top 10 hits through the rest of the 1970s, including his signature hit, "Don't the Girls All Get Prettier at Closing Time", in 1976. Some of his hits were covers, including the Bill Anderson song "City Lights", George Jones' "The Window Up Above", and Sam Cooke's "Bring It On Home to Me". Other hits from the 1970s were "Chains of Love", "Honky Tonk Memories", "She's Pulling Me Back Again" (all 1977), and "Here Comes the Hurt Again" from 1978. When Playboy Records was bought by Epic Records in 1978, Gilley went with Epic, and "The Power of Positive Drinkin'", "Just Long Enough to Say Goodbye", and "My Silver Lining" all made the Top 10.

=== Career in the 1980s with the success of Urban Cowboy ===
By 1980, Gilley sought the crossover success that many country stars (including Eddie Rabbitt, Juice Newton, Kenny Rogers, The Oak Ridge Boys, and Dolly Parton) were experiencing. His career got new life when his cover of the soul standard "Stand by Me" was used in Urban Cowboy. As the movie became successful, so did "Stand by Me". It topped the country charts, hit the Top 5 on the Adult Contemporary charts, and made the Pop Top 40. He also tried his hand at acting, taking a dramatic role in an episode of The Fall Guy in 1982 ("The Silent Partner"); he later returned to the series in a cameo as himself.

His country hits "Room Full of Roses", "True Love Ways", and "You Don't Know Me" also made the Pop chart, and "Bring It On Home To Me", "That's All That Matters", and "Talk to Me" bubbled under (at 101, 101 and 106, respectively). A string of six country number-ones followed the success of Urban Cowboy, including "True Love Ways", "A Headache Tomorrow (Or a Heartache Tonight)", "You Don't Know Me", and "Lonely Nights". "Fool For Your Love"; "Paradise Tonight", a duet with Charly McClain; and "Talk to Me" (not to be confused with the Stevie Nicks hit of the same name) were all No. 1 country hits for Gilley during 1983. In 1984, he just missed topping the country chart with "You've Really Got a Hold on Me", and another hit followed in the form of another duet with Charly McClain, "Candy Man", and a solo hit, "Too Good To Stop Now", both of which made the Top 5.

The year 1985 brought Top 10 hits with "I'm the One Mama Warned You About" and "You've Got Something on Your Mind", followed by the Top 5 "Your Memory Ain't What It Used To Be", and another Top 10 with "Doo-Wah Days" in 1986, his last Top 10 hit, as a new breed of "Traditionalists" moved into Nashville, including Clint Black, Patty Loveless, Reba McEntire, and Randy Travis. Not only was his chart success fading, but Gilley had a series of financial problems that led to the closing of his club.

In 1988, Gilley signed with Airborne and released an album, Chasin' Rainbows, which resulted in his last Top 40 country hit, "She Reminded Me of You", which made No. 23 that year.

In a career that included 15 years of chart success, Gilley had 17 No. 1 country hits.

=== Later career ===
Gilley turned his attention to Branson, Missouri, where he built a theater, which was a soon-to-be boomtown for the country music industry.

Gilley also appeared on "Urban Cowboys", episode 9 in the third season of American Pickers, which aired originally on September 5, 2011. In 2012, Gilley signed a Branson-based vocal group, Six, to a three-year lease to perform in his theater, with an option to buy it when the contract expired.

Gilley returned to the studio in 2017 and released Kickin' It Down the Road the same year. The CD contains several new recordings and several remakes of classic songs originally recorded by him.

In 2018, Gilley teamed up with longtime friend Troy Payne to record his last studio album Two Old Cats, a CD containing 13 classic country duets.

=== Personal life ===
Gilley's first wife was Geraldine Garrett, whom he married in 1953 (when he was 17 years old); they divorced in 1961. She was the mother of three of his four children (Keith Ray, Michael, and Kathy). She died on March 6, 2010. Gilley's second wife, whom he married in 1962, was Vivian McDonald. Together they had a son, Gregory (1966–2022). She died in 2019. Gilley was double first cousins with both Jerry Lee Lewis and evangelist Jimmy Swaggart of Baton Rouge, Louisiana.

In July 2009, Gilley was helping a neighbor move some furniture when he fell with the love seat falling on top of him, crushing four vertebrae. The incident left him temporarily paralyzed from the neck down, but after intense physical therapy he was able to walk again and return to the stage a year later. However, he still lacked the hand-eye coordination necessary to play the piano.

Gilley died on May 7, 2022, of complications from bone cancer.

== Honors ==
For his contribution to the recording industry, Mickey Gilley has a star on the Hollywood Walk of Fame at 6930 Hollywood Boulevard in Los Angeles, California.

On March 2, 2002, Gilley, along with his two famous cousins Lewis and Swaggart, was inducted into the Delta Music Museum Hall of Fame in Ferriday, Louisiana.

In 2020, a road in Pasadena, Texas, was renamed in his honor as Mickey Gilley Boulevard.

Gilley's Dallas, an entertainment complex in Dallas, Texas, is named for Gilley.

== Other ==
Gilley was a licensed pilot, holding an instrument rating with commercial pilot privileges for multi-engine airplanes, as well as private pilot privileges for single engine aircraft.

== Awards and nominations ==
=== Music City News Country Awards ===
Year	Nominee / work	Award	Result
1976	Mickey Gilley	Most Promising Male Artist	Won
1984	Mickey Gilley and Charly McClain	Vocal Duo of the Year	Nominated

=== Academy of Country Music Awards ===
Year	Nominee / work	Award	Result
1975	Mickey Gilley	Most Promising Male Vocalist	Won
1976	Mickey Gilley	Top Male Vocalist of the Year	Nominated
1976	Mickey Gilley	Entertainer of the Year	Nominated
1976	"Overnight Sensation"	Single Record of the Year	Nominated
1977	"Bring It On Home to Me"	Single Record of the Year	Won
1977	"Bring It On Home to Me"	Song of the Year	Nominated
1977	"Don't the Girls All Get Prettier at Closing Time"	Song of the Year	Won
1977	Gilley's Smoking	Album of the Year	Won
1977	Mickey Gilley	Top Male Vocalist of the Year	Won
1977	Mickey Gilley	Entertainer of the Year	Won
1978	Mickey Gilley	Top Male Vocalist of the Year	Nominated
1984	Mickey Gilley and Charly McClain	Top Vocal Duo of the Year	Nominated
2005	Mickey Gilley	Triple Crown Award	Awarded
