= Djaoeh Dimata =

1948 Indonesian film by Andjar Asmara

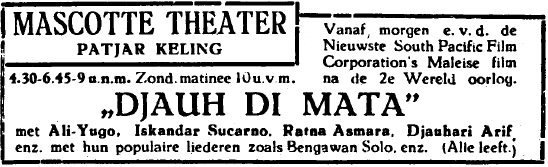
- Newspaper advertisement, Surabaya
- Directed by: Andjar Asmara
- Written by: Andjar Asmara
- Starring: Ratna Asmara; Ali Joego
- Cinematography: A.A. Denninghoff-Stelling
- Production company: South Pacific Film Corporation
- Release date: 1948 (Dutch East Indies)
- Countries: Indonesia; Dutch East Indies
- Language: Indonesian

Djaoeh Dimata (Note: Various contemporary spellings also include Djaoeh di Mata, Djauh Dimata, and Djauh di Mata.) (Indonesian: [dʒaˈuh diˈmata]; Perfected Spelling: Jauh di Mata; Indonesian for Out of Sight) is a 1948 film from what is now Indonesia (Note: The film was released during the Indonesian National Revolution, in which time Indonesia had declared itself independent while the Dutch East Indies was still formally in existence.) written and directed by Andjar Asmara for the South Pacific Film Corporation (SPFC). Starring Ratna Asmara and Ali Joego, it follows a woman who moves to Jakarta to find work after her husband is blinded in an accident. SPFC's first production, Djaoeh Dimata took two to three months to film and cost almost 130,000 gulden.

The first domestically produced feature film to be released in five years, Djaoeh Dimata received favourable reviews, although financially it was outperformed by Roestam Sutan Palindih's Air Mata Mengalir di Tjitarum (released soon after). The film's cast remained active in the Indonesian film industry, some for another 30 years, and SPFC produced six more works before closing in 1949. A copy of the film is stored at Sinematek Indonesia.

== Plot ==
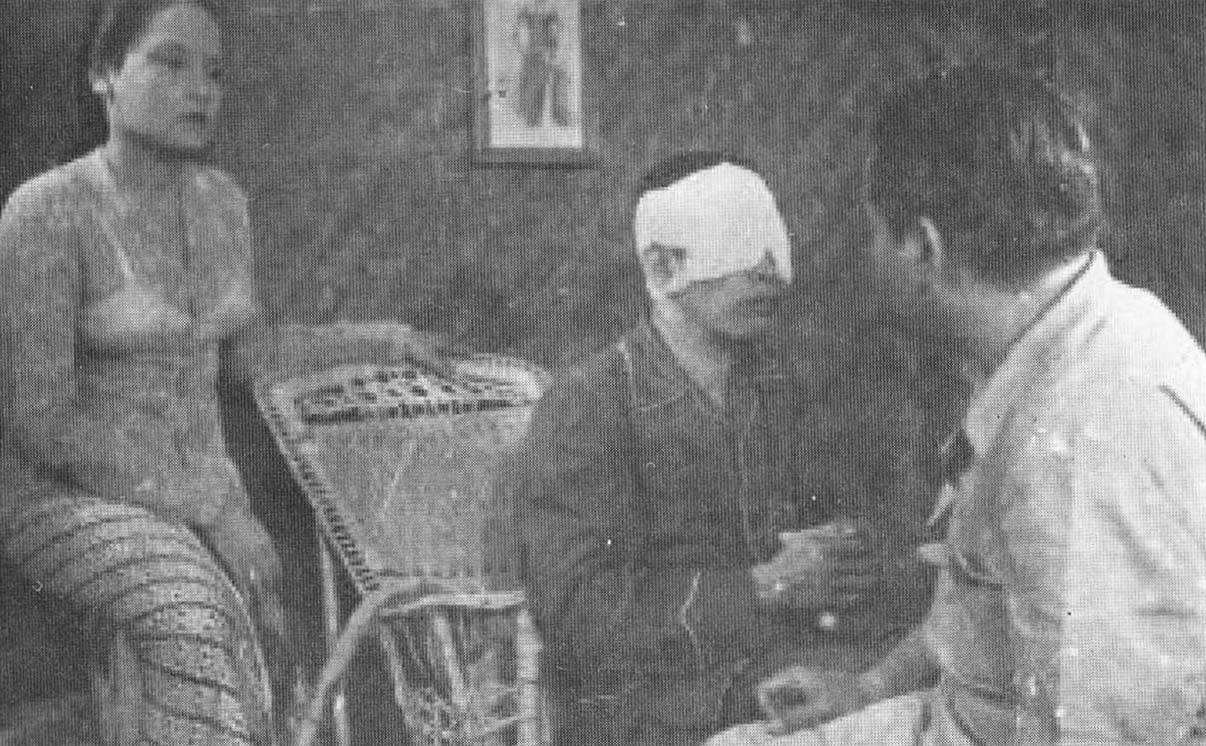
Ratna Asmara, Ali Joego, and Iscandar Sukarno in a scene from the film

A poor villager, Asrad (Ali Joego), is blinded following a traffic accident and thus unable to work. As a result, his wife Soelastri (Ratna Asmara) travels to the capital, Jakarta, to find a job. As Asrad does not trust his wife and fears she may be unfaithful, he writes her a letter telling her not to return. Soelastri becomes a singer, and – unknown to Asrad – soon achieves wide acclaim. Her most popular song, "Djaoeh Dimata", receives heavy airplay on the radio and soon becomes one of Asrad's favourites. Ultimately Soelastri is brought home by Soekarto (Iskandar Sucarno), who attempts to pass her off as a maid for Asrad. When Asrad recognises his wife's voice, they are reconciled.

== Background ==
The first two years of the 1940s saw a growth in the cinema of the Dutch East Indies, with over forty domestic productions released. Following the Japanese occupation in February 1942, production slowed greatly and nearly all film studios were closed. The last studio, the ethnic Chinese-owned Multi Film, was confiscated by the Japanese to establish the film production company Nippon Eigasha in Jakarta, the colony's capital. This included Multi Film's equipment, with which Nippon Eigasha produced one feature film – Rd Ariffien's Berdjoang (Struggle; 1943) – six short films, and several newsreels. All were pro-Japanese propaganda.

After the Japanese surrender in August 1945, a number of native Indonesian employees of Nippon Eigasha formed Berita Film Indonesia, which first made use of the studios. This company was allied with the newly proclaimed Indonesian government. During the ensuing revolution, allied Dutch and British forces occupied Jakarta in November 1945. The Dutch took over the studio, and production of newsreels at Multi Film's studios began in 1947 under the banner Regerings Film Bedrijf. The following year the Dutch established a subsidiary company to produce fictional films. This new company, the South Pacific Film Corporation (SPFC), was subsidised in part by the Netherlands Indies Civil Administration, a continuation of the former Dutch colonial government of the Indies.

== Production ==
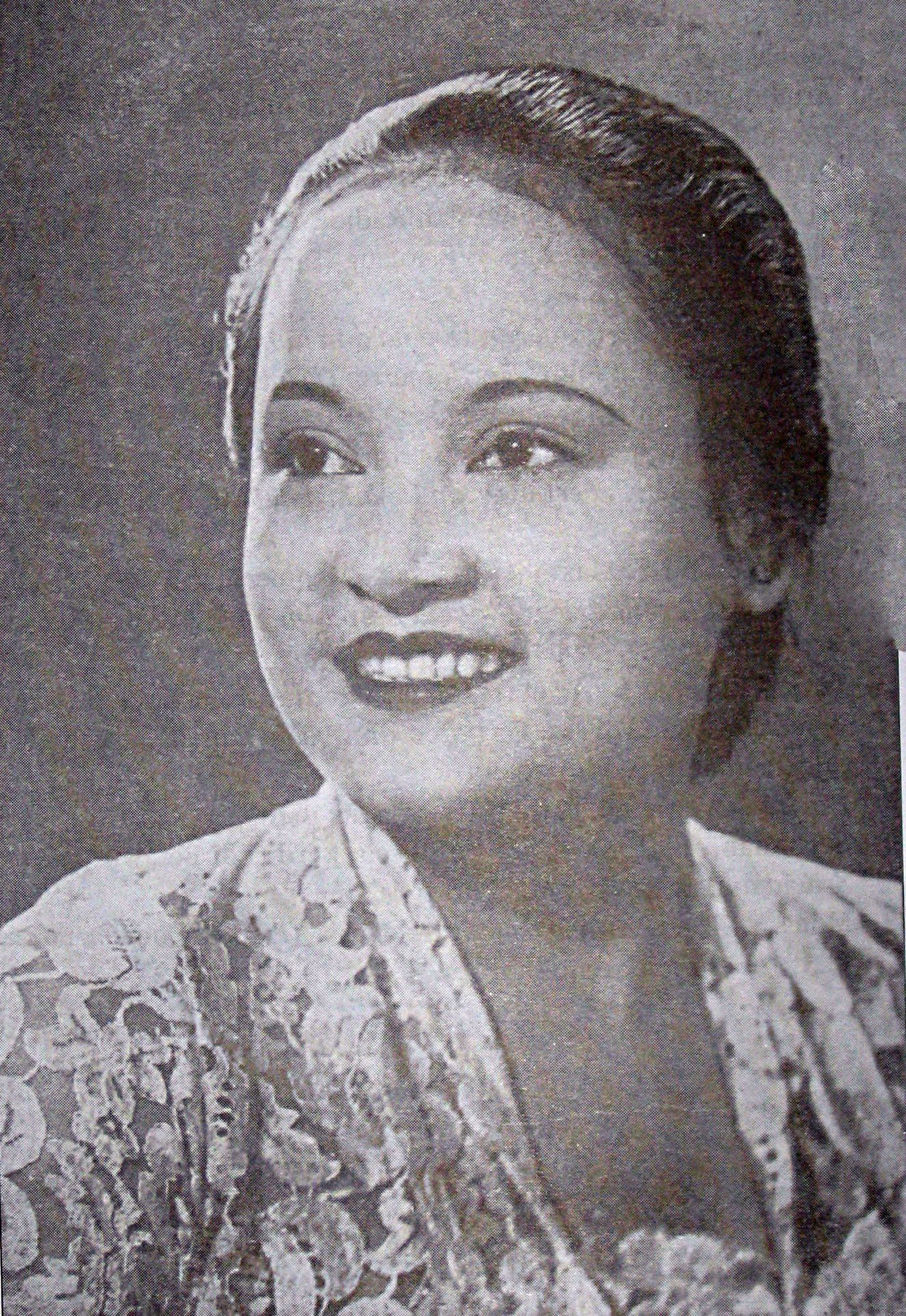
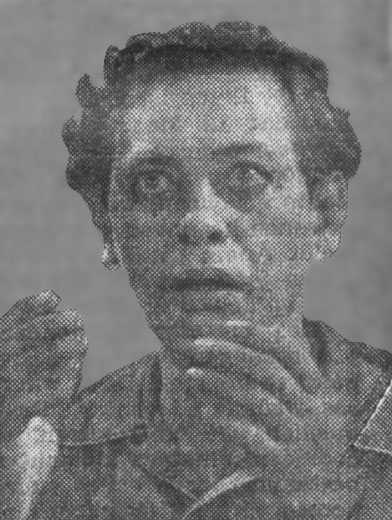
Ratna Asmara and Ali Joego, stars of the film

SPFC hired Andjar Asmara, a former journalist and stagewriter who had been active with The Teng Chun's Java Industrial Film before the Japanese occupation, to direct Djaoeh Dimata; he based the screenplay on his stageplay of the same name. However, as with his pre-war ventures, the native Indonesian Andjar was more of an acting and dialogue coach; the Dutch cinematographer, A.A. Denninghoff-Stelling, held more creative power over the final product. Max Tera served as assistant cinematographer on this black-and-white film.

The film starred Ratna Asmara (wife of Andjar), Ali Yugo, Iskandar Sucarno, and Djauhari Effendi, (Note: Sources do not indicate Effendi's role.) all of whom had previous theatrical experience. Ratna and Ali, together with Andjar, had been members of the travelling troupe Dardanella in the early 1930s and entered the film industry together in 1940 with Kartinah. Iskandar and Djauhari, meanwhile, had been active in the theatre during the occupation; both made their feature film debuts with Djaoeh Dimata.

Principal photography was conducted on sets constructed by artistic director Hajopan Bajo Angin in SFPC's studio in Jakarta. The company's equipment was of good quality, but conditions were detrimental to filming; a contemporary report notes that one take, done inside the studio, was ruined by the sound of a passing car. Filming, which took two to three months, was completed on 10 November 1948. Production costs were almost 130,000 gulden, (Note: At the time, 130,000 gulden was officially the equivalent to US$ 50,000, with an exchange rate at 2.6 gulden to the dollar. Owing to the war, however, the black market price of dollars was four to five times as much (Mooney 1948, Holland).) which was partially obtained from ethnic Chinese backers. The film included multiple songs, including Gesang Martohartono's 1940 hit "Bengawan Solo".

A documentary detailing one day of the production, called Er wordt een film gemaakt ("A film is being made") exists in the Netherlands.

== Release and reception ==
Djaoeh Dimata was released in late 1948, the first domestic feature film since Berdjoang. Despite this five-year gap, film critic Usmar Ismail writes that it did not stray from the formula which had been proven before the war, one which Indonesian film historian Misbach Yusa Biran notes focused on songs, beautiful scenery and romance. Roestam Sutan Palindih's Air Mata Mengalir di Tjitarum (Tears Flow in Citarum), which had similar themes, was released shortly after Djaoeh Dimata by the rival Tan & Wong Bros.; it proved the greater financial success. Only three domestic productions were released in 1948; the last was another SPFC production, entitled Anggrek Bulan (Moon Orchid), which was also directed by Andjar.

Reviews of the film, which was rated for all ages, were mixed. One in the Jakarta-based Het Dagblad found the film to have many (unspecified) weak moments as well as strong ones. It particularly praised Ali's acting as a blind man, as well as Denninghoff-Stelling's camerawork. Another reviewer, in the magazine Mestika, described Ratna as an "unprecedented tragedienne" (Note: Original: "... een tragedienne zonder weerga") capable of making viewers cry "unrestrained tears of emotion". (Note: Original: "... zijn tranen van ontroering, niet bedwingen kan.") After Djaoeh Dimata was released in Singapore in June 1949, a reviewer for The Straits Times praised the film's "fine photography and almost perfect sound".

Andjar directed two further films for South Pacific, Anggrek Bulan and Gadis Desa (Maiden from the Village; 1949). Ratna had no further acting roles, although in 1950 she became Indonesia's first female director with Sedap Malam (Sweetness of the Night), for Djamaluddin Malik's company Persari. Ali, Iskandar, and Djauhari remained active as actors, Ali and Iskandar through the 1960s and Djauhari until the 1970s. SPFC made another six films before shutting down at the end of the Indonesian National Revolution in 1949. (Note: The Dutch had recognised Indonesia's independence after several months of negotiations. In the aftermath, the Indonesian government acquired Regerings Film Bedrijf, SPFC's parent company. It was merged with Berita Film Indonesia to form Perusahaan Pilem Negara (State Film Company), later renamed Produksi Film Negara (JCG, Berita Film Indonesia).) A 35 mm copy of Djaoeh Dimata is stored at Sinematek Indonesia in Jakarta.

== Works cited ==
- "Ali Yugo". filmindonesia.or.id (in Indonesian). Jakarta: Konfidan Foundation. Archived from the original on 8 August 2014.
- "Andjar Asmara". Encyclopedia of Jakarta (in Indonesian). Jakarta City Government. Archived from the original on 4 July 2012.
- "Berita Film Indonesia". Encyclopedia of Jakarta (in Indonesian). Jakarta City Government. Archived from the original on 1 January 2013.
- Biran, Misbach Yusa (2009). Sejarah Film 1900–1950: Bikin Film di Jawa [History of Film 1900–1950: Making Films in Java] (in Indonesian). Jakarta: Komunitas Bamboo working with the Jakarta Art Council. ISBN 978-979-3731-58-2.
- "Camera draait in studio's van Multifilm 'Djaoeh di Mata'" [The Camera Turns in Multifilm's Studios for 'Djaoeh di Mata']. Het Dagblad (in Dutch). Jakarta. 11 November 1948. p. 2.
- Danujaya, Budiarto; Tjasmadi, Mohammad Johan (1992). Layar Perak: 90 Tahun Bioskop di Indonesia [Silver Screen: 90 Years of Cinema in Indonesia] (in Indonesian). Jakarta: Gramedia. OCLC 28028443.
- "Djaoeh di Mata". Het Dagblad (in Dutch). Jakarta. 13 March 1949. p. 2. Archived from the original on 2 July 2013.
- "'Djaoeh di Mata' – een Indonesiesche film" ['Djaoeh di Mata' – an Indonesian Film]. Het Vrije Volk (in Dutch). Rotterdam. 4 December 1948. p. 6. Archived from the original on 2 July 2013.
- "Djaoeh Dimata". filmindonesia.or.id (in Indonesian). Jakarta: Konfiden Foundation. Archived from the original on 2 December 2013.
- "Djauhari Effendi". filmindonesia.or.id (in Indonesian). Jakarta: Konfidan Foundation. Archived from the original on 4 March 2016.
- "Een 'Anak Medan' als Filmster" [An 'Anak Medan' as an Actress]. Het Nieuwsblad voor Sumatra (in Dutch). Medan. 3 March 1949. p. 2.
- "In Batavia Wordt Gefilmd 'Djauh di mata' eerste Indonesische speelfilm" [Filmed in Batavia: 'Djauh di Mata', the First Indonesian Film]. Limburgsch Dagblad (in Dutch). Heerlen. 26 November 1948. p. 5. Archived from the original on 2 July 2013.
- "Indies Film in S'pore". The Straits Times. Singapore. 8 June 1949. p. 7 – via National Library of Singapore.
- "Indonesische films" [Indonesian Films]. De Vrije Pers (in Dutch). Surabaya. 11 November 1948. p. 2.
- "Iskandar Sucarno". filmindonesia.or.id (in Indonesian). Jakarta: Konfidan Foundation. Archived from the original on 20 October 2016.
- Ismail, Usmar (1983). "Sari Soal dalam Film Indonesia" [A Summary of Issues Faced by Indonesian Films]. Usmar Ismail Mengupas Film [Usmar Ismail Discusses Film] (in Indonesian). Jakarta: Sinar Harapan. pp. 53–66. OCLC 10435722.
- "Kredit Djaoeh Dimata" [Credits for Djaoeh Dimata]. filmindonesia.or.id (in Indonesian). Jakarta: Konfidan Foundation. Archived from the original on 7 March 2016.
- "Max Tera". filmindonesia.or.id (in Indonesian). Jakarta: Konfidan Foundation. Archived from the original on 2 December 2013.
- Mooney, George A. (14 November 1948). "Holland Attacked on Indies Policies". The New York Times. pp. F1, F2.(subscription required)
- Said, Salim; McGlynn, John H.; Heider, Karl G (1991). Cinema of Indonesia: Eleven Indonesian Films, Notes & Synopses. New York: Festival of Indonesia Foundation. ISBN 978-1-879578-00-5.
- "South Pacific Film". filmindonesia.or.id (in Indonesian). Jakarta: Konfidan Foundation. Archived from the original on 7 March 2016.
- Sumardjo, Jakob (1992). Perkembangan Teater Modern dan Sastra Drama Indonesia [Development of Modern Theatre and Literary Drama in Indonesia] (in Indonesian). Bandung: Citra Aditya Bakti. ISBN 978-979-414-615-6.
- Swestin, Grace (July 2009). "In the Boys' Club: A Historical Perspective on the Roles of Women in the Indonesian Cinema 1926 – May 1998". Scriptura. 3 (2). Surabaya: Petra Christian University: 103–111. Archived from the original on 16 April 2014.
- "(untitled)". De Vrije Pers (in Dutch). De Erven J.A. Wormser Mogelijk freelancers. 18 May 1949. p. 4.
