= Noesa Penida =

1941 film by Andjar Asmara

- Directed by: Andjar Asmara
- Screenplay by: Andjar Asmara
- Produced by: The Teng Chun
- Starring: Ratna Asmara; Astaman; Rd Ismail; Ali Joego
- Production company: New Java Industrial Film
- Release date: 1941 (Dutch East Indies)
- Country: Dutch East Indies
- Language: Indonesian

Noesa Penida ([nuˈsa pəˈnida]; Perfected Spelling Nusa Penida) is a 1941 film from the Dutch East Indies (present-day Indonesia) which was directed by Andjar Asmara and produced by The Teng Chun of Java Industrial Film. It tells of a love triangle between two brothers, born to a commoner, and a noble woman.

== Plot ==
On the island of Nusa Penida, two common-born brothers (Jaya and I Pageh) are friends with Pandansari, daughter of the king. When the king is murdered, Pandansari goes into hiding with her father's loyal manservant I Murda. Jaya, I Pageh, and Pandansari are soon entangled in a love triangle, one which is rendered more difficult owing to differences in caste. Ultimately, after rumors emerge that Jaya has been killed, Pandansari chooses I Pageh.

== Production ==
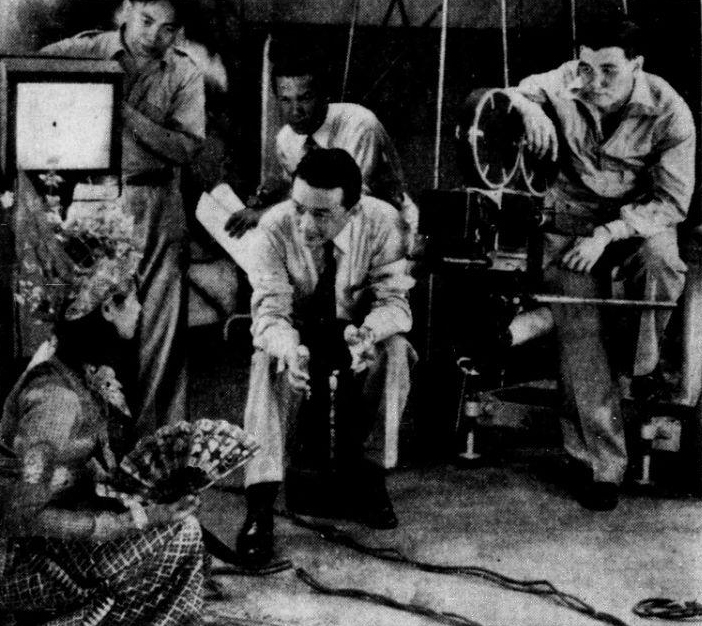
The Teng Chun

Noesa Penida was produced by The Teng Chun for his company New Java Industrial Film (New JIF). It was written and directed by Andjar Asmara, a former journalist and stage-writer who had made his directorial debut the preceding year with Kartinah. HB Angin handled artistic direction. Andjar and his wife, Ratna, each earned 1,000 gulden for their roles in the film; this was several times the wages of Roekiah and Kartolo, stars at New JIF's competitor Tan's Film.

The film starred Ratna Asmara, as well as Astaman, Rd Ismail, and Ali Joego. Ratna and Astaman, both with a background as stage performers, had previously worked with Andjar in Kartinah.

== Release and reception ==
Noesa Penida was released in 1941. A 35 mm copy of the film is stored at Sinematek Indonesia in Jakarta.

Noesa Penida has been adapted several times. During its initial run it was brought to the stage by various troupes. From 30 June to 14 September 1942 Andjar published a serialization of the film in the newspaper Asia Raja. It was compiled as a novel in 1950. The film was remade in 1988 as Noesa Penida (Pelangi Kasih Pandansari) (Noesa Penida (Pandansari's Rainbow of Love)). Directed by Galeb Husein and with adaptations by Asrul Sani, the remake starred Ida Ayu Made Diastini, Ray Sahetapy, and Sutopo HS.

== Works cited ==
- "Abisin Abbas". Filmindonesia.or.id (in Indonesian). Jakarta: Konfidan Foundation. Archived from the original on 19 February 2014.
- Biran, Misbach Yusa (2009). Sejarah Film 1900–1950: Bikin Film di Jawa [History of Film 1900–1950: Making Films in Java] (in Indonesian). Jakarta: Komunitas Bamboo working with the Jakarta Art Council. ISBN 978-979-3731-58-2.
- "Kartinah". filmindonesia.or.id (in Indonesian). Jakarta: Konfiden Foundation. Archived from the original on 2 December 2013.
- "Kredit Noesa Penida" [Credits for Noesa Penida]. filmindonesia.or.id (in Indonesian). Jakarta: Konfiden Foundation. Archived from the original on 20 October 2016.
- Mahayana, Maman S. (2005). Sembilan Jawaban Sastra Indonesia [Nine Answers Regarding Indonesian Literature] (in Indonesian). Jakarta: Bening. ISBN 978-979-3934-09-9.
- Mahayana, Maman S. (2007). Ekstrinsikalitas Sastra Indonesia [Extrinsic Events in Indonesian Literature] (in Indonesian). Jakarta: RajaGrafindo Persada. ISBN 978-979-769-115-8.
- Mahayana, Maman S.; Sofyan, Oyon; Dian, Achmad (1995). Ringkasan dan Ulasan Novel Indonesia Modern [Summaries and Commentary on Modern Indonesian Novels] (in Indonesian). Jakarta: Grasindo. ISBN 978-979-553-123-4.
- "Noesa Penida". filmindonesia.or.id (in Indonesian). Jakarta: Konfiden Foundation. Archived from the original on 2 December 2013.
- "Noesa Penida (Pelangi Kasih Pandansari)". filmindonesia.or.id (in Indonesian). Jakarta: Konfiden Foundation. Archived from the original on 17 April 2014.
