= Ali Joego =

Indonesian actor and film director (1907–1970)

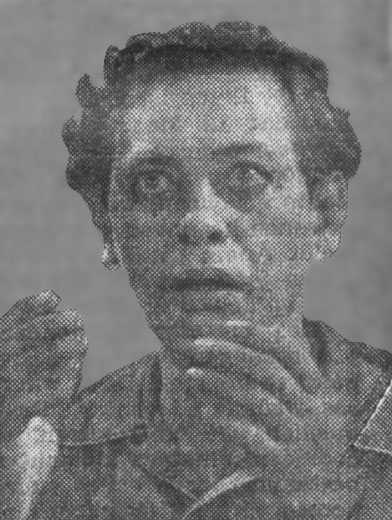
- Joego in Djaoeh Dimata (1948)
- Born: Suratmi; 17 March 1907
- Died: 18 February 1970 (aged 62); Jakarta
- Occupation: Actor
- Years active: 1940–63
- Spouse: Sutijem
- Relatives: Devi Dja (sister-in-law)

Ali Joego (Soewandi Spelling Ali Jugo; Perfected Spelling: Ali Yugo; 17 March 1907 – 18 February 1970) was a stage and film actor and director active in the Dutch East Indies and Indonesia. During his twenty-year career he appeared in thirty films and directed seven.

== Biography ==
Joego was born in Makassar on the island of Celebes in the Dutch East Indies on 17 March 1907. He and his parents moved to Singapore, part of the British Straits Settlements, where he was raised. Joego did not receive much education.

In the late 1920s, Joego returned to the East Indies and became a member of the theatre troupe Dardanella, which was run by the Penang-born actor of Russian descent Willy A. Piedro and his native wife Dewi Dja'. Joego and the troupe, which included Andjar Asmara as the main script writer and actors such as Dja', Ratna Asmara, and Astaman, toured Southeast Asia. In 1936 it undertook a trip to India, hoping to produce a film version of Andjar's stage play Dr Samsi. Under financial duress, this plan collapsed, and Dardanella disbanded; Joego made his way back to the Indies and established his own theatrical troupe.

Joego entered the film industry in 1940, when he and several former Dardanella members joined The Teng Chun's Java Industrial Film (JIF) for the film Kartinah, which was directed by Andjar Asmara and starred Ratna and Astaman. Over the next two years Joego appeared in a further five films, all but one of which was for JIF or one of subsidiaries. His only appearance from the period in a non-JIF film was in Air Mata Iboe (1941), produced by the rival company Majestic. In the film, he depicted a man who becomes a robber and dies of guilt after his son is taken prisoner in his place.

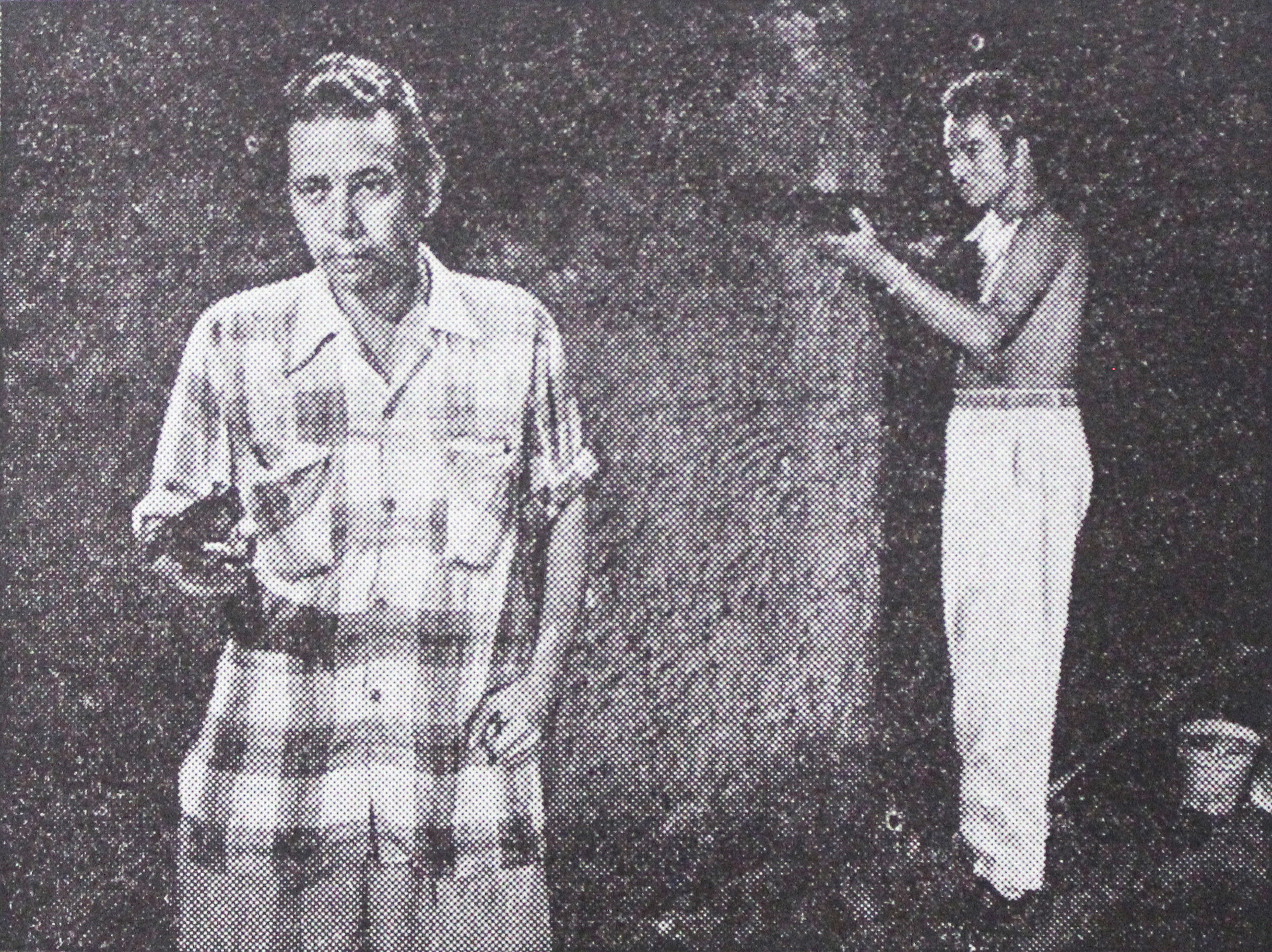
Joego (left) in Sri Asih (1954)

During the Japanese occupation of 1942–45, Joego led two stage troupes, Batu Tjinta and Nusantara. He returned to cinema in 1948 with Djaoeh Dimata, in which he was cast alongside Ratna Asmara and portrayed a blind man who chases away his wife after fearing that she has been unfaithful. Joego appeared in one further film for the production company, South Pacific Film, the Andjar Asmara-directed Gadis Desa (1949).

As the 1950s dawned, Joego became increasingly involved in the film industry, though mostly behind the screen. In 1951, he directed his first two films, Penganten Baru for Tan & Wong Bros. (a joint venture of the Tan and Wong brothers) and Marunda for Persari (under the direction of Djamaluddin Malik). The latter film depicted a love triangle set against the Indonesian National Revolution. Joego directed a further three films in three years, for various different companies.

Although he ventured into filmmaking, Joego remained active as an actor. He appeared in six films between 1950 and 1954. In 1955, with the domestic cinema faltering, Joego ceased directing to focus on acting. He acted in a further ten films by the end of the decade. In 1963, Joego made his last film, Daerah Tak Bertuan. He died on 18 February 1970. Despite his twenty-year career he was – according to the magazine Mingguan Djaja – never famous.

== Filmography ==
Altogether Joego acted in 30 films. He directed seven more, at times also providing the story.

=== Actor ===
- Kartinah (1940)
- Noesa Penida (1941)
- Elang Darat (1941)
- Poetri Rimba (1941)
- Elang Darat (1941)
- Tengkorak Hidoep (1941)
- Air Mata Iboe (1941)
- Ratna Moetoe Manikam (1941)
- Poetri Rimba (1941)
- Djaoeh Dimata (1948)
- Gadis Desa (1949)
- Sehidup Semati (1949)
- Harumanis (1950)
- Kusuma Hati (1951)
- Marunda (1951)
- Pelarian dari Pagar Besi (1951)
- Bintang Surabaya (1951)
- Penganten Baru (1951)
- Taufan (1952)
- Bung Tempe (1953)
- Djali-Djali (1954)
- Sri Asih (1954)
- Rela (1954)
- Gambang Semarang (1955)
- Oh, Ibuku (1955)
- Puteri Revolusi (1955)
- Melati Sendja (1956)
- Daerah Hilang (1956)
- Rajuan Alam (1956)
- Bintang Peladjar (1957)
- Gembira Ria (1959)
- Momon (1959)
- Holokuba (1959)
- Titian Serambut Dibelah Tudjuh (1959)
- Sepiring Nasi (1960)
- Dilereng Gunung Kawi (1961)
- Badja Membara (1961)
- Daerah Tak Bertuan (1963)

=== Crew ===
- Marunda (1951) – Director and story
- Penganten Baru (1951) – Director
- Taufan (1952) – Director
- Bung Tempe (1953) – Director
- Djali-Djali (1954) – Director, screenwriter, and story
- Oh, Ibuku (1955) – Director
- Puteri Revolusi (1955) – Director

== Works cited ==
- "Air Mata Iboe". filmindonesia.or.id (in Indonesian). Jakarta: Konfiden Foundation. Archived from the original on 2 December 2013.
- "(Article about Asrul Sani)". Mingguan Djaja (in Indonesian) (41): 4. 1962.
- Biran, Misbach Yusa, ed. (1979). Apa Siapa Orang Film Indonesia 1926–1978 [What and Who: Film Figures in Indonesia, 1926–1978]. Sinematek Indonesia. OCLC 6655859.
- Biran, Misbach Yusa (2009). Sejarah Film 1900–1950: Bikin Film di Jawa [History of Film 1900–1950: Making Films in Java] (in Indonesian). Jakarta: Komunitas Bamboo working with the Jakarta Art Council. ISBN 978-979-3731-58-2.
- "Dardanella". Encyclopedia of Jakarta. Jakarta City Government.
- "Djaoeh Dimata". filmindonesia.or.id (in Indonesian). Jakarta: Konfiden Foundation. Archived from the original on 2 December 2013.
- "Filmografi Ali Yugo" [Filmography for Ali Yugo]. filmindonesia.or.id (in Indonesian). Jakarta: Konfiden Foundation. Archived from the original on 8 August 2014.
- "Gadis Desa". filmindonesia.or.id (in Indonesian). Jakarta: Konfiden Foundation. Archived from the original on 2 December 2013.
- "Marunda". filmindonesia.or.id (in Indonesian). Jakarta: Konfiden Foundation. Archived from the original on 8 August 2014.
- "Penganten Baru". filmindonesia.or.id (in Indonesian). Jakarta: Konfiden Foundation. Archived from the original on 8 August 2014.
- "Riwajat Astaman" [Tale of Astaman]. Varia (in Indonesian) (305): 15, 29, 30. 19 February 1964.
