= Ratna Asmara =

Indonesian actress and director (1913–1968)

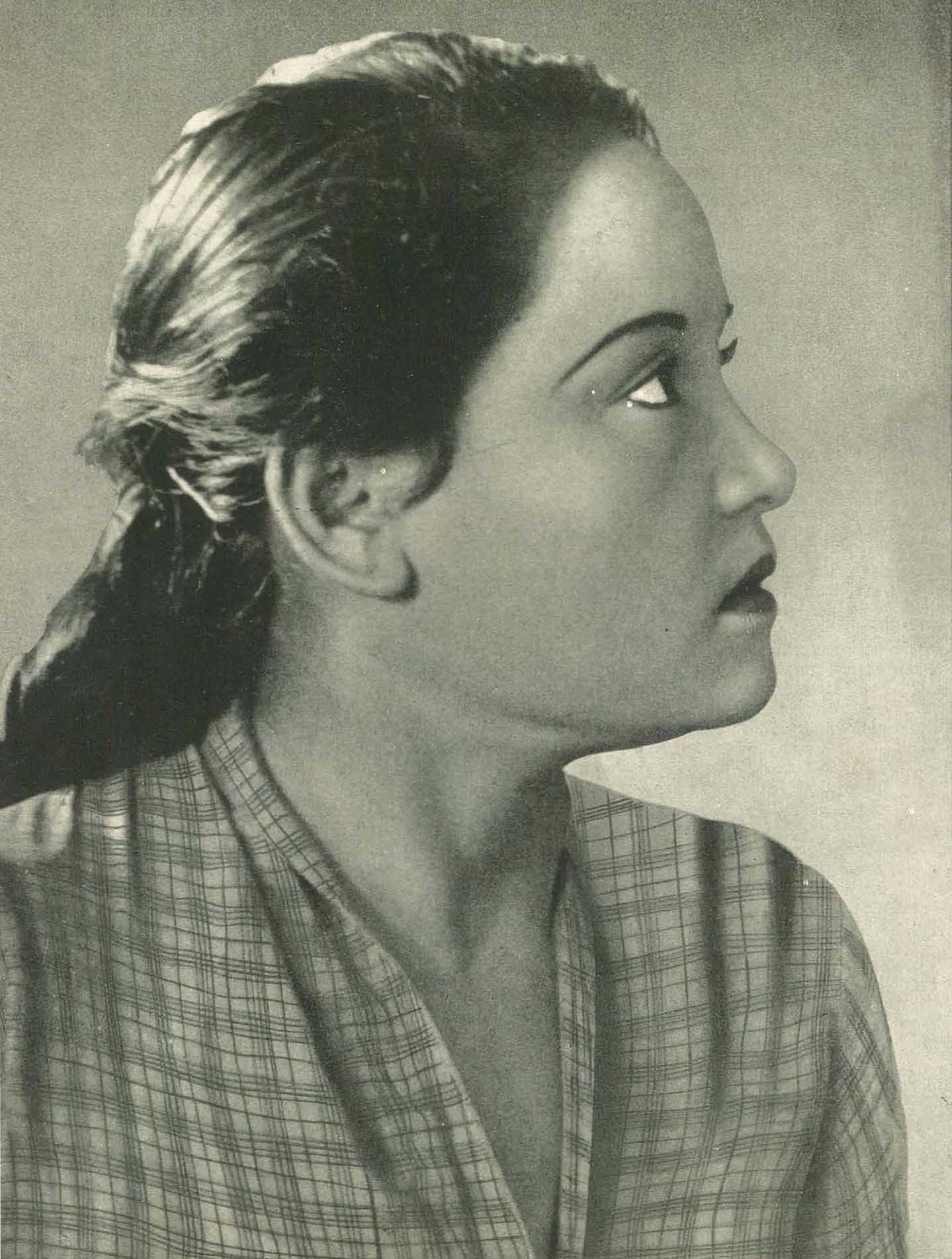
- Ratna in 1953
- Born: Suratna; 1913; Sawahlunto, Dutch East Indies
- Died: 10 August 1968 (aged 54–55); Jakarta, Indonesia
- Burial place: Blok P Cemetery
- Other names: Ratna Suska
- Occupations: Actress; film director
- Years active: 1928–1954
- Spouses: Andjar Asmara (m. 1931; div. 1952) Sutan Usman Karim (m. 1952)
- Children: 3
- Relatives: Bachtiar Effendi (brother-in-law)

Ratna Asmara (born Suratna; 1913 – 10 August 1968), also known as Ratna Suska, was an Indonesian actress and director. Originally active in theatre, she starred in the romance film Kartinah (1940), which her first husband Andjar directed.

After appearing in several further films, she made her directorial debut in 1950 with Sedap Malam (Sweetness of the Night), which made her the first female film director in Indonesian history. Although her work was generally ignored, later female Indonesian directors have found critical acclaim.

== Life and career ==
Ratna Asmara was born Suratna in 1913 in Sawahlunto, Dutch East Indies. This ethnic Sundanese actress has two sister who worked as an actress, Lena and Suhara. Lena was a film actress who starred in Alang-Alang (1939) and Melati van Agam (1940), while Suhara was a stage actress who married to the director Bachtiar Effendi, and later made her film debut by starring in B. S. Rajhans's directed Singapura di Waktu Malam (1947).

On 7 April 1931, Ratna married Andjar Asmara, and joined the Dardanella touring troupe in the early 1930s; with the troupe she was known for the quality of her voice. In the late 1930s she joined Andjar with his Bolero troupe and became its star. She also acted for the Royal Balinese Dancers. Their daughter, Noer Asmara, was born in c. 1936.

In August 1937, Andjar signed a contract with Paramount Pictures and moved to Singapore after Bolero's last performance in Medan on 14 August. They later cast Ratna in Booloo (1938) as a native Sakai girl and already completed half of the filming production in Singapore and British Malaya as of 4 March 1938. When Booloo was released in July 1938, Ratna's role was replaced by Mamo Clark in the new version which was recorded in Hollywood. Even though her scene had been cut, she remained as the first Malay representation in Hollywood.

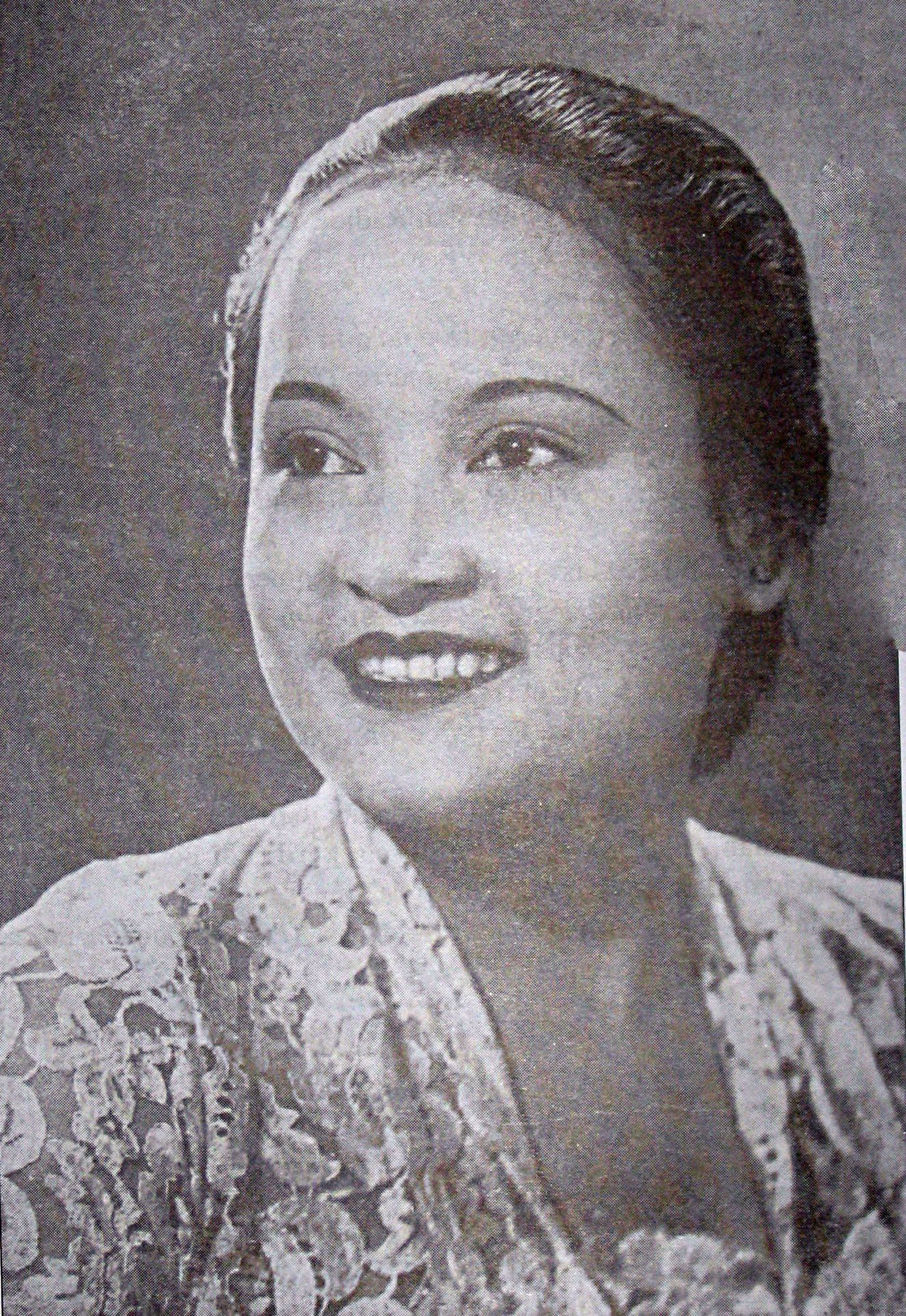
A promotional portrait of Ratna for Kartinah (1940)

When Andjar was asked by The Teng Chun to direct a film for The's company Java Industrial Film (JIF), Ratna came with him. The couple earned 1,000 gulden each for their role in the resulting film, Kartinah (1940), Andjar as director and Ratna as its star. The film, a love story between the nurse Kartinah (played by Ratna) and her commander, was also the first war film in the country, taking place within the Air Raid Preparation teams (Luch Bischermen Diens).

Ratna also appeared in Andjar's later directorial work, Noesa Penida (a love story set in Bali) and in Ratna Moetoe Manikam, a story about a love triangle between two goddesses and a mortal man. During the National Revolution following Indonesia's independence, Ratna appeared in one further film: Andjar's 1948 Djaoeh Dimata (Out of Sight).

In 1950, Ratna was commissioned by Djamaluddin Malik to direct the film Sedap Malam (Sweetness of the Night) for Malik's company Persari; Malik produced. Andjar wrote the screenplay. This made her the first female film director in the country. This was followed by two further films for the ethnic Chinese-owned Djakarta Film, both of which Andjar wrote: Musim Bunga di Selabintana (Spring in Selabintana) in 1951 and Dr Samsi in 1952. In an interview with Minggu Pagi, she said that she was influenced by her favorite Hollywood stars such as Greta Garbo, Barbara Stanwyck, Vivien Leigh, and Greer Garson. In 1952, Ratna divorced Andjar and married Suska, a former director and screenwriter turned diplomat. The couple had a two children and several grandchildren.

In 1953, Ratna established Ratna Films, which had a single production, Nelajan (The Fishermen), before being rebranded Asmara Films. This new company produced Dewi dan Pemilihan Umum (Dewi and the Election) in 1954, with Ratna as director; this coincided with the first legislative elections in 1955. Ratna left Indonesia for Italy to study film in 1954. In 1961, Suska became the Indonesian ambassador in Rangoon. He then transferred to India in 1964, where Ratna moved to New Delhi with him.

== Death and legacy ==
Ratna suffered a heart attack while giving drinks to the demonstrators in New Delhi, India. She died at St. Carolus Hospital in Senen, Central Jakarta, on 10 August 1968, after suffered complication from a long period illness at the age of 55. Her funeral was held at Blok P Cemetery in Kebayoran Baru, South Jakarta, on the evening of 11 August, and was attended by Usmar Ismail.

After Ratna, only five female directors appeared in Indonesian cinema until near the end of the 20th century: Roostijati, Sofia W.D., Chitra Dewi, Ida Farida, and Rima Melati. These directors rarely, if ever, received the same recognition as their male counterparts; acting remained the only way for a woman in the industry to gain recognition. Indeed, during her directorial career Ratna received little support from male directors.

After the fall of Suharto in 1998, the number of women directors has increased dramatically, with several of them receiving national and international recognition. The earliest in this generation are Mira Lesmana and Nan Achnas, who collaborated with several other directors in Kuldesak (1999). Further examples include Nia Dinata, who has had two of her films, Ca-bau-kan (2002) and Berbagi Suami (2006) submitted for an Academy Award for Best Foreign Language Film; Ucu Agustin has been described as "one of Indonesia’s top documentary filmmakers" and had her films screened internationally; while Djenar Maesa Ayu's Mereka Bilang, Saya Monyet! (2008) was on several lists of the best films of the year.

== Filmography ==
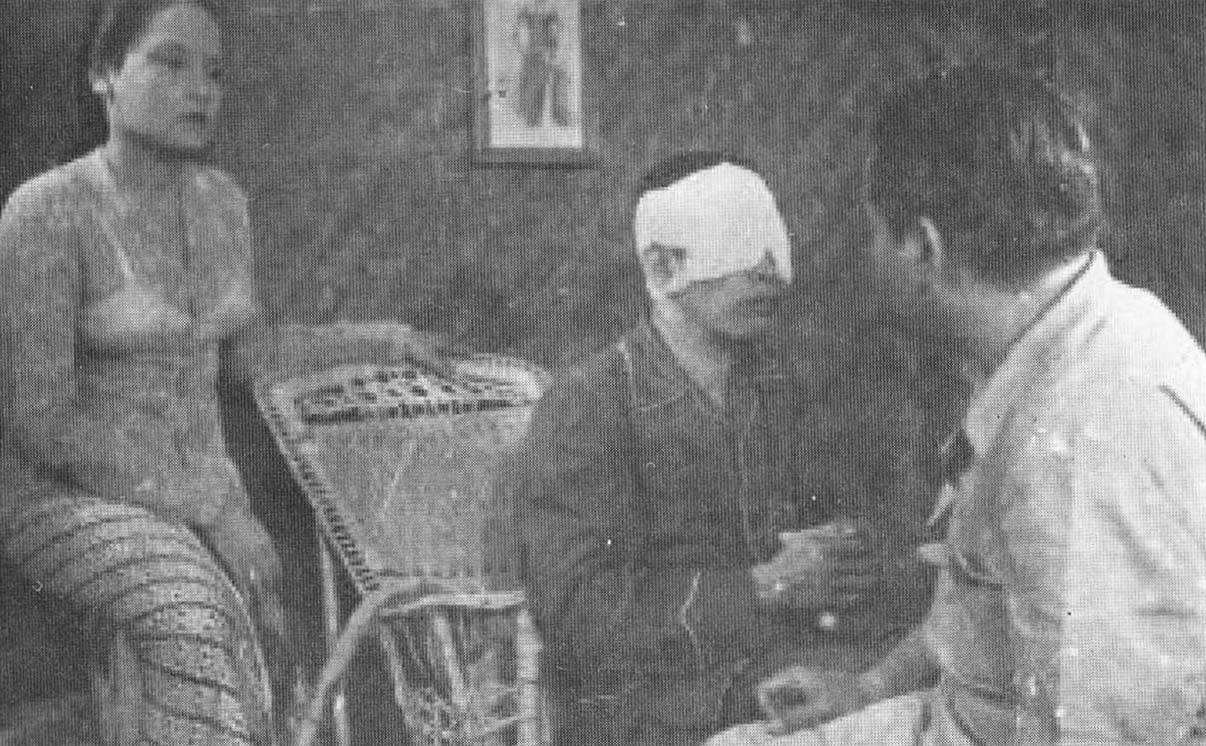
Ratna, Ali Joego, and Iskandar Sukarno in Djaoeh di Mata (1948)

Cast
Year	Film	Role
1937	Dr. Samsi	–
1938	Booloo	Native girl
1940	Kartinah	Kartinah
1941	Ratna Moetoe Manikam	Ratna Moetoe Manikam
1941	Noesa Penida	–
1948	Djaoeh Dimata (Out of Sight)	Soelastri
1952	Dr Samsi	Sukaesih

Crew
Year	Film	Credited as
1950	Sedap Malam (Sweetness of the Night)	Director
1951	Musim Bunga di Selabintana (Spring in Selabintana)	Director
1952	Dr Samsi	Director
1953	Nelajan (The Fishermen)	Director, producer, and screenwriter
1954	Dewi dan Pemilihan Umum (Dewi and the Election)	Director
