= Colin Tapley =

New Zealand actor (1909–1995)

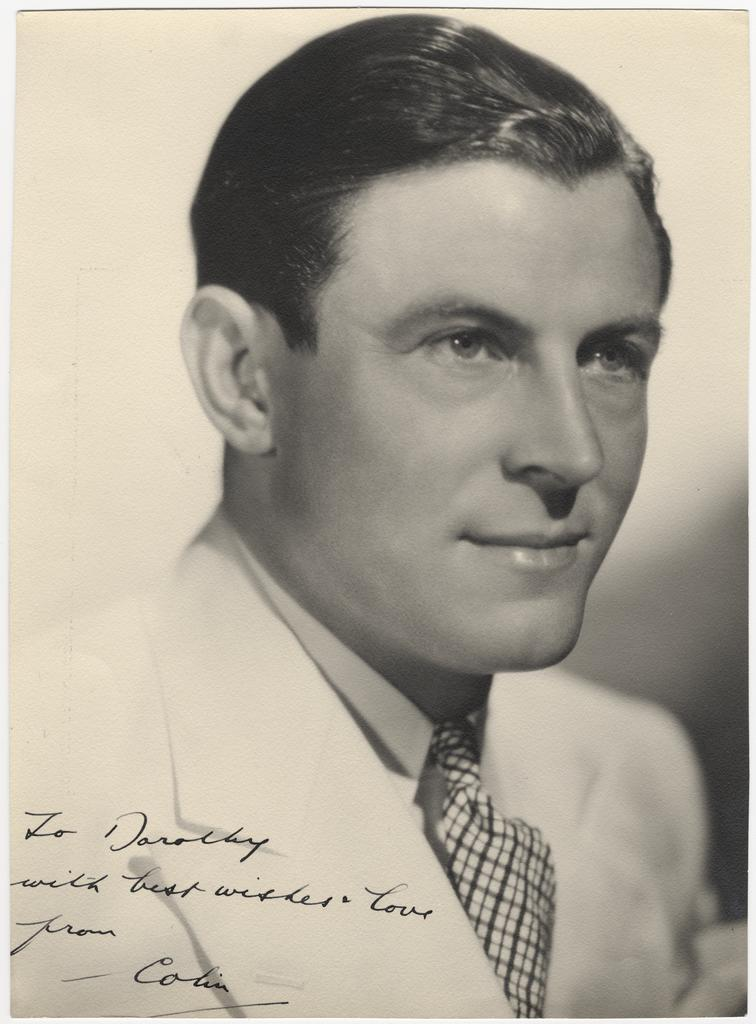
- Studio shot of Tapley in 1933, possibly the image used by Tapley in the Paramount Pictures 'Search for Beauty' contest
- Born: Colin Edward Livingstone Tapley; 7 May 1909; Dunedin, New Zealand
- Died: 1 December 1995 (aged 86); Coates, Gloucestershire, England
- Occupation: Actor
- Years active: 1933–1983
- Spouse: Patricia Hambro
- Relatives: Harold Tapley (father)

Colin Edward Livingstone Tapley (7 May 1909 – 1 December 1995) was a New Zealand actor in both American and British films. Born in New Zealand, he served in the Royal Air Force and an expedition to Antarctica before winning a Paramount Pictures talent contest and moving to Hollywood. He acted in a number of films before moving to Britain during the Second World War as a flight controller with the Royal Canadian Air Force.

He returned briefly to New Zealand before returning once again to Britain to renew his acting career. His most famous role is as William Glanville in The Dam Busters (1955), but he spent much of his later career typecast as a police inspector, a role he played in several films and TV series before retiring to Gloucestershire.

== Early life and family ==
Tapley was born on 7 May 1909 at Dunedin, New Zealand, the son of Harold Livingstone Tapley, later mayor of Dunedin and MP for Dunedin North, and Jean Brodie Tapley (née Burt). He was educated at Christ's College, Christchurch from 1918 to 1926, and took part in the first of Richard Byrd's expeditions to Antarctica before moving to the United Kingdom and joining the Royal Air Force.

== Paramount Pictures and life in Hollywood ==
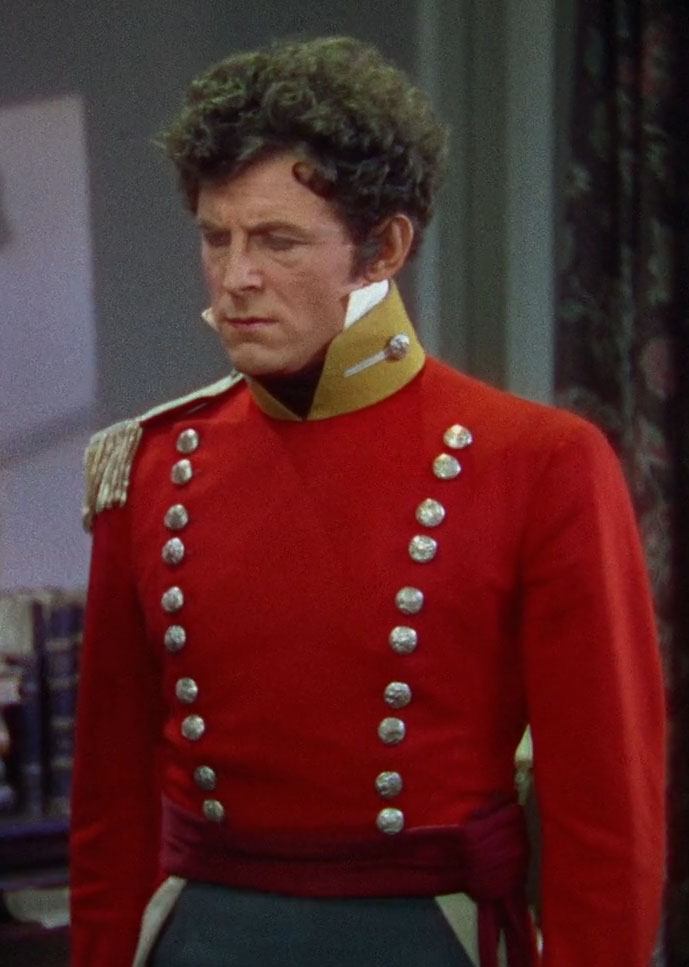
Tapley as Dobbin in the Technicolor film Becky Sharp (1935)

In 1933 he entered a talent contest organised by Paramount Pictures and was selected as one of thirty winners and one of only two from New Zealand. The talent quest was organised for English speaking countries and winners were given small parts in a film. The film was called Search for Beauty (1934). He was rewarded with a contract with Paramount as a bit part actor and appeared uncredited in several films. In 1935 he played Captain Dobbin in a film version of Vanity Fair, Becky Sharp and had his only lead role in Booloo (1938). Tapley had the debonair good looks, voice and talent of a star, but he found his niche in playing character roles, and appeared in American and British films for more than 30 years without any real desire for movie stardom. Tapley's desire for character parts came early in his Hollywood career. He wrote home enthusiastically to one of his brothers about his small part in The Scarlet Empress (1934), describing the long black beard and wonderful uniform that transformed him into the captain of the queen's bodyguard. Although his performance went uncredited, Tapley is seen directing the firing of the guns from the palace battlements, and yelling, "It's a boy!" to the excited crowd after the future empress played by Marlene Dietrich gives birth to a son". He continued to work in some of the biggest movies of the 1930s, starring the likes of Cary Grant, Loretta Young, Ronald Colman and Gary Cooper. "The most wonderful experience of my life," is how he later recalled those years "I adored every bit of it."

During this time he shared a flat with Donald Gray and they would remain close friends until Gray's death in 1978. His best friend in Hollywood was Fred MacMurray, who with his first wife, Lillian Lamont visited Tapley in New Zealand and England with his second wife, when Tapley had moved back to be with his own wife and children. MacMurray and Tapley remained great friends up until MacMurray's death in 1991. Tapley was a keen horseman and an avid polo player; playing at the Riveria Polo Club, and on his ranch in the San Fernando Valley where his friends and neighbours would spend time, one of whom being Ginger Rogers. He recalled later, 'popping over to her place for tennis and what not', before the war broke out whereupon he left Hollywood and returned to England.

== Second World War and RAF career ==
In January 1942 Tapley returned to Britain on the Brimanger to help the war after enlisting in the Royal Canadian Air Force. He found employment as a flight instructor due to his past experience in the Royal Air Force and was later transferred to Britain as a flight controller. During his service he was forced to parachute from a crashing aircraft and so was awarded membership of the Caterpillar Club.

== Later film career ==
After demobilisation in 1945, Tapley married Patricia (Patsy) Hambro Lyon, whom he had met during the war, and returned to his native New Zealand for the first time since 1933. He soon tired of life in New Zealand and returned to Hollywood to re-establish his film career. Legendary American film director and Academy Award-winning film producer Cecil B. DeMille personally gave him a role in his new film, Samson and Delilah, which Tapley accepted, playing the part of a prince. Shortly after finishing Samson and Delilah, Tapley and Patsy, finding that Hollywood had changed for the worse, returned to Britain. Due to Tapley's upper class accent he had no difficulty finding work in the film industry; it was also the boom period of British war films in the '50s and '60s and he landed the role of a lifetime, the revered war epic The Dam Busters film of 1955 where alongside Michael Redgrave he played William Glanville who helped to develop the famous bouncing bomb. From 1954 to 1958, he appeared as a police inspector named Parker, working with his good friend Donald Gray, in the detective television series The Vise (later known as Saber of London). He was subsequently typecast and would play a police officer in many of his later films. His acting career ended in 1983, at the age of 74, and he retired to Coates, Gloucestershire with his wife, Patsy.

== Personal life and death ==
During his time in England while in the RAF, Tapley met Patricia "Patsy" Lyon, the widowed daughter of Major-General Sir Percival Otway and Lady Hambro of the Hambro banking dynasty. Despite being from one of England's most prestigious aristocratic-banking families, with close family ties to the Royal family, they opted to marry quietly as London lay in ruins after "the Blitz". Her parents, twin brother, Everard Hambro and other family members were present at the St Martin-in-the-Fields wedding in August 1943. Tapley and Patsy lived in New Zealand and Hollywood before settling down in Coates, Gloucestershire. Tapley lived in New Romney, Kent working for the first time in a regular job not as a Thespian. He was employed by the CEGB in 1964 as a meter reader in the control room at Dungeness 'A' nuclear power station. On night shifts he would regale his fellow workers with tales of Hollywood actors, their lives and loves. He remained in Coates until his death in December 1995, aged 86. Tapley was buried in Wānaka, New Zealand, next to his first son Martin, who had died at the age of 3 of leukaemia in 1947. Patsy remained at their house in Coates until her death on 18 January 2000 survived by their second son Nigel Tapley, two granddaughters, and stepdaughter, Charlotte Ann Lyon, wife of the late shipping mogul Sir Kerry St. Johnston.

== Partial Filmography ==
Year	Title	Role	Director	Other cast members	Notes
1934	Search for Beauty	New Zealand Talent Contestant	Erle C. Kenton	Buster Crabbe, Ida Lupino, Robert Armstrong, James Gleason	Uncredited
1934	Come On Marines!	Marine	Henry Hathaway	Richard Arlen, Ida Lupino, Roscoe Karns	Uncredited
1934	Double Door	Dr. John Lucas	Charles Vidor	Evelyn Venable, Mary Morris, Kent Taylor, Sir Guy Standing	
1934	Murder at the Vanities	Stage Manager	Mitchell Leisen	Carl Brisson, Victor McLaglen, Jack Oakie, Kitty Carlisle	Uncredited
1934	The Notorious Sophie Lang	Minor Role	Ralph Murphy	Gertrude Michael, Paul Cavanagh, Leon Errol	Uncredited
1934	Wagon Wheels	Mountaineer	Charles Barton	Randolph Scott, Gail Patrick, Monte Blue, Raymond Hatton	
1934	The Pursuit of Happiness	Aide to Sir Henry Clinton	Alexander Hall	Francis Lederer, Joan Bennett, Charlie Ruggles, Mary Boland	Uncredited
1934	Limehouse Blues	Man Fighting with Wife	Alexander Hall	George Raft, Jean Parker, Anna May Wong	Uncredited
1934	The Scarlet Empress	General	Josef von Sternberg	Marlene Dietrich, John Lodge, Sam Jaffe, Louise Dresser, Sir C. Aubrey Smith	
1935	Becky Sharp	Captain William Dobbin	Rouben Mamoulian	Miriam Hopkins, Frances Dee, Cedric Hardwicke, Billie Burke, Alison Skipworth, Nigel Bruce	
1935	The Black Room	Paul Hassel as a young lieutenant	Roy William Neill	Boris Karloff, Marian Marsh	
1935	The Lives of a Bengal Lancer	Lieutenant Barrett	Henry Hathaway	Gary Cooper, Franchot Tone, Sir Guy Standing	
1937	The Crime Nobody Saw	Dr. Randolph Brooks	Charles Barton	Lew Ayres, Ruth Coleman, Eugene Pallette	
1938	Booloo	Captain Robert Rogers	Clyde E. Elliott	Jayne Regan, Mamo Clark	
1938	Storm Over Bengal	Flight Lt. Hallett	Sidney Salkow	Patric Knowles, Richard Cromwell, Rochelle Hudson	
1939	The Light That Failed	Gardner	William A. Wellman	Ronald Colman, Walter Huston, Muriel Angelus, Ida Lupino	
1951	Cloudburst	Inspector Davis	Francis Searle	Robert Preston, Elizabeth Sellars, Sheila Burrell, Harold Lang	
1952	Wide Boy	Mannering	Ken Hughes	Sydney Tafler, Susan Shaw, Ronald Howard	
1953	The Steel Key	Doctor Crabtree	Robert S. Baker	Terence Morgan, Joan Rice, Raymond Lovell	
1955	The Dam Busters	Dr. William Glanville	Michael Anderson	Richard Todd, Michael Redgrave, Ursula Jeans, Basil Sydney, Derek Farr	
1955	Barbados Quest	Lord Valchrist	Bernard Knowles	Tom Conway, Delphi Lawrence, Brian Worth	
1957	Rogue's Yarn	Police Inspector	Vernon Sewell	Nicole Maurey, Derek Bond	
1962	Emergency	Doctor Lloyd	Francis Searle	Glyn Houston, Zena Walker, Dermot Walsh	
1962	Strongroom	Haynes	Vernon Sewell	Derren Nesbitt, Colin Gordon, Ann Lynn	
1962	The Lamp in Assassin Mews	Inspector	Godfrey Grayson	Francis Matthews, Lisa Daniely, Ian Fleming, Amy Dalby	
1964	Shadow of Fear	John Bowen	Ernest Morris	Paul Maxwell, Clare Owen, Anita West, John Sutton	
1969	Fräulein Doktor	General Metzler	Alberto Lattuada	Suzy Kendall, Kenneth More, Nigel Green, Alexander Knox	
