= Sedap Malam =

- Promotional flyer
- Directed by: Ratna Asmara
- Written by: Andjar Asmara
- Produced by: Djamaluddin Malik
- Starring: Sukarsih; M. Pandji Anom
- Production company: Persari Film Corporation
- Release date: 14 February 1951
- Country: Indonesia
- Language: Indonesia

Sedap Malam (Indonesian for Sweetness of the Night, or a name of a night-blooming flower) is a 1951 film directed by Ratna Asmara and produced by Djamaluddin Malik for Persari. Starring Sukarsih and M. Pandji Anom, it follows a woman who descends into prostitution after her husband marries another woman. It was both Persari's first production and the first film directed by a woman in Indonesian history.

== Plot ==
Over a period of several years, Patmah has worked to help her husband Tamin build his book-selling business into a large printing house. However, in the early 1940s, after the business begins to succeed Tamin takes on a younger wife. Outraged at her husband's polygyny, Patmah abandons him and goes to work as a nurse, leaving their four-year-old daughter Nuraini with her friend, Tinah.

During the Japanese occupation, Patmah is promised that she can receive further training as a nurse in Tokyo. Upon arrival, however, she discovers that the young nurses are actually intended as comfort women. Patmah thus spends the remainder of World War II satisfying the sexual desires of Japanese soldiers. After the war, when she returns to Indonesia, Patmah is unable to reintegrate into society and continues work as a prostitute.

One day, Patmah hears that the now-adult Nuraini is to be wed to Tamin, now a widower; both are unaware of their blood relations. She succeeds in breaking up the planned marriage and in arranging for Nuraini to wed Burhan, a young author whom Nuraini loves. Patmah is tried for prostitution shortly afterwards and eventually dies of a sexually transmitted disease.

== Production ==
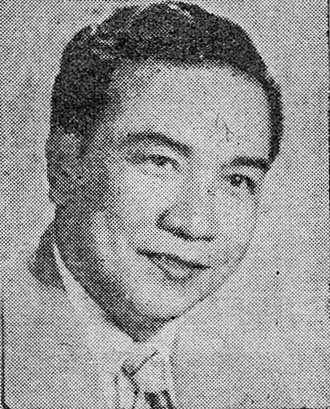
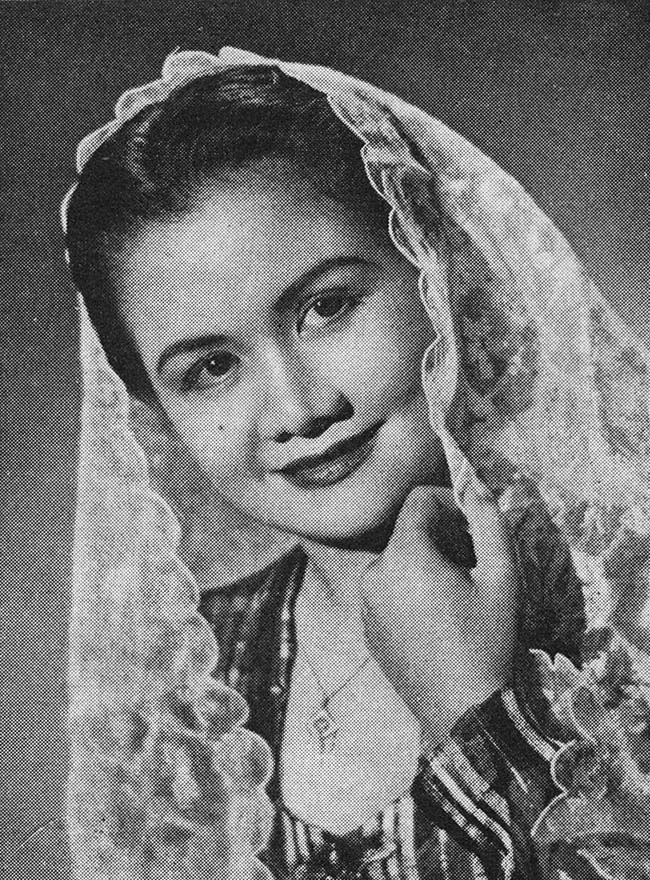
M. Pandji Anom and Sukarsih, the film's stars

Sedap Malam was directed by Ratna Asmara, a former stage and film actress who had starred in such films as Kartinah (1940) and Djaoeh di Mata (1949), in her directorial debut. The film thus became the first in Indonesian history to be directed by a woman; previously, women had been limited to acting roles. The film was also the first production by Persari (Perseroan Artis Indonesia, or Indonesian Artists Corporation), a production house headed by Djamaluddin Malik. This was his first foray into film, though he had backed the travelling theatre troupe Bintang Timur during the Indonesian National Revolution.

Andjar Asmara, Ratna's husband and a former film director and dramatist, penned the story for Sedap Malam. The Indonesian film historian Misbach Yusa Biran classifies the film's plot as characteristic of the theatre and of domestic films produced between 1937 and 1941: "melodramatic stories, dramatisations fabricated with tired themes" (Note: Original: "... cerita melodramatik, dramatisasi yang mengada-ada dengan tema usang.") such as materialistic women, loan sharks, arranged marriages, and polygamy.

Production for Sedap Malam began in September 1950, and by December of that year Persari was advertising its black-and-white film as being immediately ready for distribution. Sukarsih and M. Pandji Anom were cast in the film's starring roles, as Patmah and Tamin respectively. Komalasari portrayed the adult Nuraini, whereas Rd Mochtar took the role of Burhan. Aminah was cast in a supporting role. Sound editing for the film was handled by Boen Kim Nam, whereas cinematography was done by Tjit Ka Sie.

== Release and legacy ==
Sedap Malam premiered in Jakarta at the Rex, Roxy, Orion, and Shanghai theatres on 14 February 1951. Rated for audiences aged 17 and older, it was advertised as the first Indonesian film to deal with the issue of prostitution. By May 1951 Sedap Malam had been released in Malang, East Java, where it was described as a "super production by Persari which will shake and demand the attention of society". (Note: Original: "Super Produksi dari PERSEROAN ARTIS INDONESIA jang akan menggontjang dan menuntut perhatian masjarakat.")

Ratna Asmara followed Sedap Malam with another four productions, two of which she produced through her Asmara Studios. During her directorial career Ratna received little support from male directors. Women directors remained uncommon in Indonesia until the 2000s. Only five women directors other than Ratna Asmara are recorded between 1950 and 1998: Roostijati, Chitra Dewi, Sofia W.D., Rima Melati, and Ida Farida. These directors rarely, if ever, received the same recognition as their male counterparts; acting remained the only way for a woman in the industry to gain recognition.

== Works cited ==
- Biran, Misbach Yusa, ed. (1979). Apa Siapa Orang Film Indonesia 1926–1978 [What and Who: Film Figures in Indonesia, 1926–1978]. Jakarta: Sinematek Indonesia. OCLC 6655859.
- Biran, Misbach Yusa (2009). Peran Pemuda dalam Kebangkitan Film Indonesia [The Role of the Youth in the Development of the Indonesian Film Industry] (in Indonesian). Jakarta: Ministry of Youth and Sports. OCLC 607257806.
- Chotimah, Fanny (11 February 2011). "Perempuan di Dalam dan di Belakang Layar" [Women on and Behind the Screen] (in Indonesian). Bentara Budaya. Archived from the original on 7 October 2011.
- Kristanto, JB, ed. (2007). Katalog Film Indonesia 1926– 2007. Jakarta: Nalar. ISBN 978-979-26-9006-4.
- Lent, John A (1999). Women and Mass Communications in 1990s: An International, Annotated Bibliography. Westport: Greenwood Press. ISBN 978-0-313-30209-1.
- "Pemberitahuan" [Announcement]. Java-Bode (in Indonesian). 18 December 1950. p. 4.
- "Produksi Pertama dari "Persari"" [First Production of "Persari"]. Aneka (in Indonesian). 1 (13). Jakarta: 1. 1 September 1950.
- Sedap Malam (brochure) (in Indonesian), Persari Film Corporation, 1951
- "Sedap Malam". Java-Bode (in Dutch). 14 February 1951. p. 4.
- Swestin, Grace (July 2009). "In the Boys' Club: A Historical Perspective on the Roles of Women in the Indonesian Cinema 1926 – May 1998". Scriptura. 3 (2). Surabaya: Petra Christian University: 103–111. Archived from the original on 16 April 2014.
