= Hawaii Calls (film) =

1938 film by Edward F. Cline

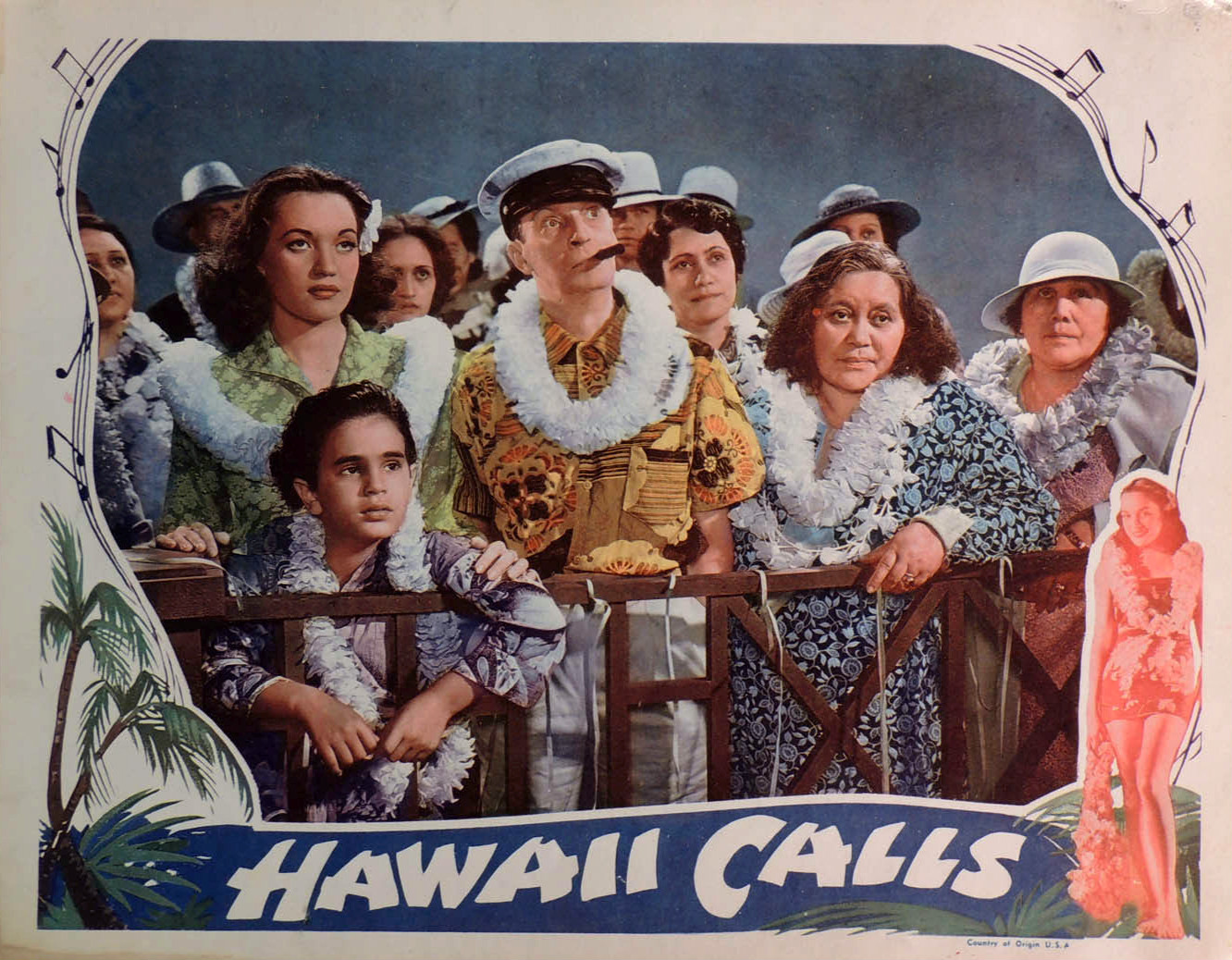
- Lobby card
- Directed by: Edward F. Cline
- Written by: Don Blanding (novel); Wanda Tuchock (writer)
- Produced by: Sol Lesser
- Starring: See below
- Cinematography: Jack MacKenzie
- Edited by: Arthur Hilton
- Music by: Hugo Riesenfeld
- Distributed by: RKO Radio Pictures
- Release date: March 11, 1938
- Running time: 91 minutes
- Country: United States
- Language: English

Hawaii Calls is a 1938 American musical drama film directed by Edward F. Cline, produced by Sol Lesser Productions and Bobby Breen Productions, and released by RKO Radio Pictures.

== Plot ==
Just for the adventure of it, orphan boy Billy Coulter stows away on a Hawaii-bound cruise ship. Even after he is discovered, his talent for making new friends allows him safe passage.

Coulter makes two special friends on the voyage, Captain O'Hare and ship's musician, Strings, who claims to be an expert at "The Bulgarian Banjo".

Coulter ends up preventing a major jewel robbery, and he is adopted by Naval Commander Milburn.

== Cast ==
- Bobby Breen as Billy Coulter
- Ned Sparks as Strings
- Irvin S. Cobb as Captain O'Hare
- Warren Hull as Commander Milburn
- Gloria Holden as Mrs. Milburn
- Juanita Quigley as Doris Milburn
- Mamo Clark as Hina
- Pua Lani as Pua
- Raymond Paige as himself
- Herbert Rawlinson as Harlow
- Dora Clement as Mrs. Harlow
- Philip Ahn as Julius
- Donald Kirke as Regon
- William Abbey as Lonzo
- Ward Bond as Muller
- Birdie De Bolt as Aunty Pinau
- Laurence Duran as Banana
- William Harrigan as Blake
- Ruben Maldonado as Solly
- Aggie Auld as Hula Dancer
- Cy Kendall as Hawaiian Policeman
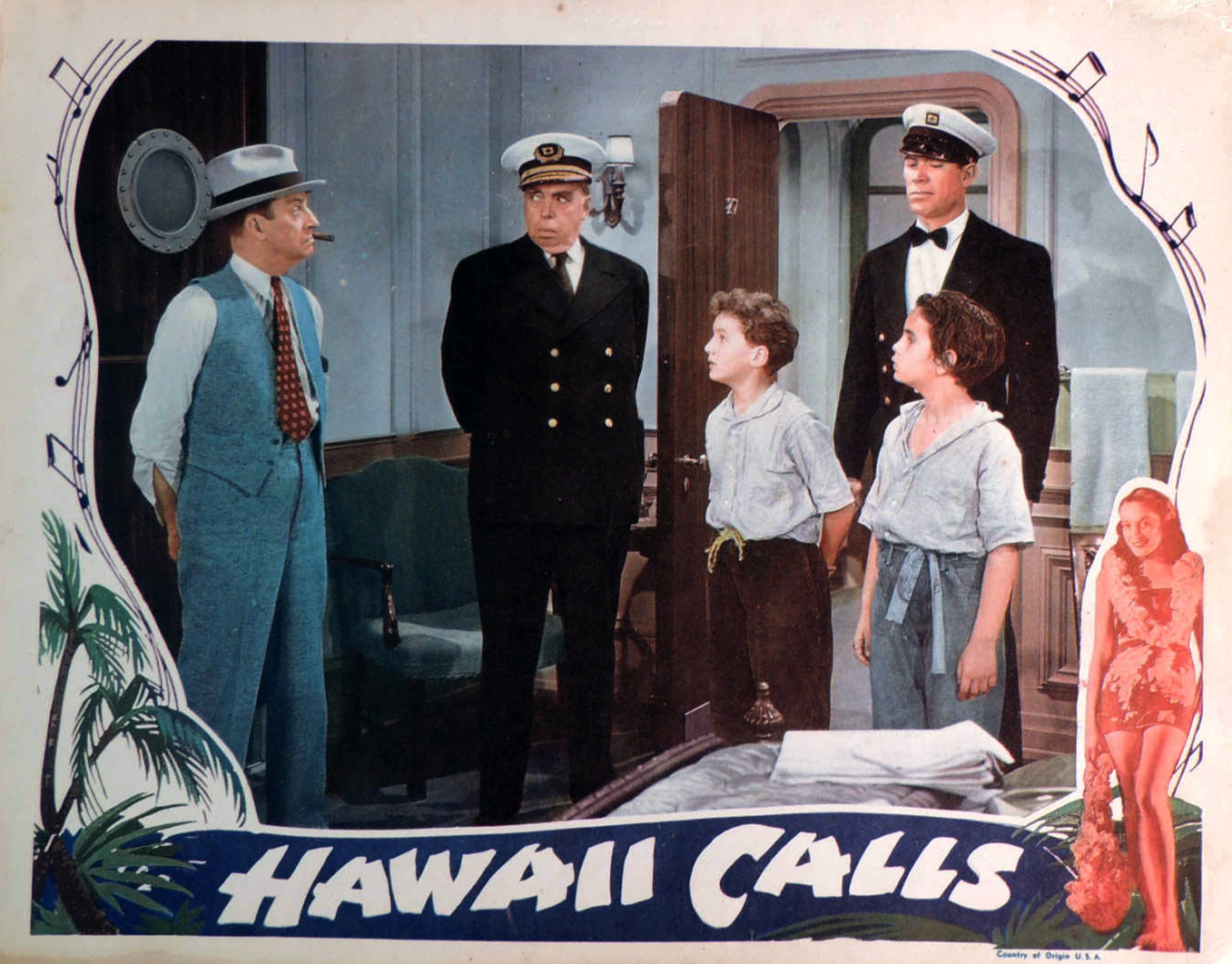

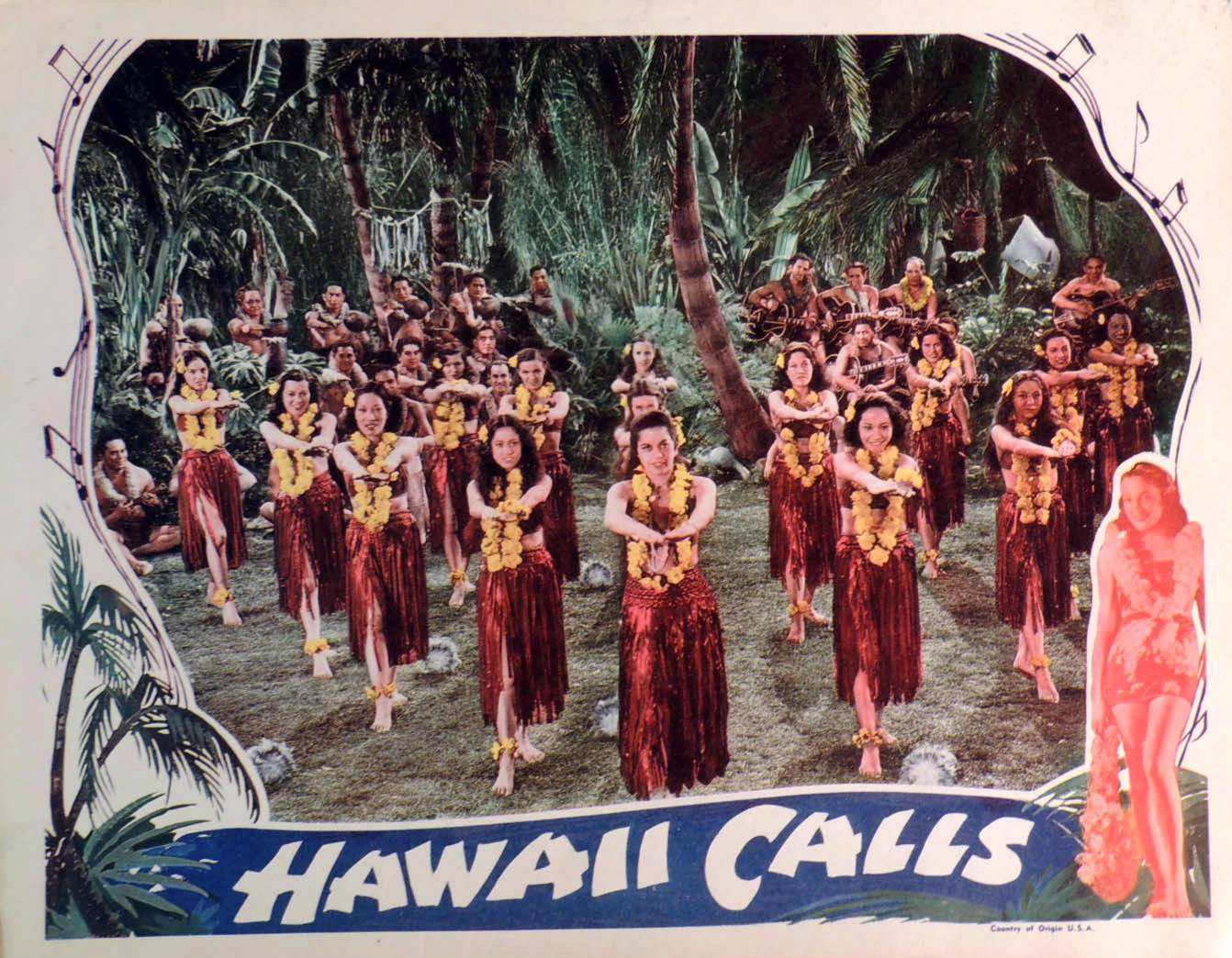

== Soundtrack ==
- Bobby Breen – "Down Where the Trade Winds Blow" (Written by Harry Owens)
- Bobby Breen – "Hawaii Calls" (Written by Harry Owens)
- Bobby Breen – "That's the Hawaiian in Me" (Written by Johnny Noble and Margarita Lake)
- "España" (Music by Emmanuel Chabrier)
- "Macushla" (Words by Josephine V. Rowe, music by Dermot Macmurrough)
- "Song Of The Islands (Na Lei O Hawaii)" (Words and Music by Charles E. King)
