= Wallaby Jim of the Islands =

- Theatrical release poster
- Directed by: Charles Lamont
- Screenplay by: Bennett Cohen; Houston Branch
- Produced by: Bud Barsky
- Starring: George F. Houston; Ruth Coleman; Douglas Walton; Wilhelm von Brincken; Mamo Clark; Colin Campbell
- Cinematography: Ira H. Morgan
- Edited by: Guy V. Thayer Jr.
- Production company: Grand National Films Inc.
- Distributed by: Grand National Films Inc.
- Release date: December 17, 1937
- Running time: 61 minutes
- Country: United States
- Language: English

Wallaby Jim of the Islands is a 1937 American adventure film directed by Charles Lamont and written by Bennett Cohen and Houston Branch. The film stars George F. Houston, Ruth Coleman, Douglas Walton, Wilhelm von Brincken, Mamo Clark, and Colin Campbell. The film was released on December 17, 1937, by Grand National Films Inc., a poverty-row studio.

== Plot ==
Jim and his men found a valuable source of pearls in the South Pacific. However, his partner Brooks lost most of their money on gambling, and Jim now has no money to claim the pearls. His rival, Ritcher, takes advantage of the situation.

== Cast ==
- George F. Houston as Wallaby Jim
- Ruth Coleman as Allison
- Douglas Walton as Norman Brooks
- Wilhelm von Brincken as Adolph Richter
- Mamo Clark as Lana
- Colin Campbell as Limey
- Syd Saylor as Jake
- Juan Torena as Pascal the Thief
- Nick Thompson as Carneli Joe
- Warner Richmond as Karl Haage
- Edward Gargan as Buck Morgan
- Wilson Benge as Macklin
- Chris-Pin Martin as Mike
- Kenneth Harlan as Michael Corell
