= Andjar Asmara =

Indonesian dramatist and filmmaker (1902–1961)

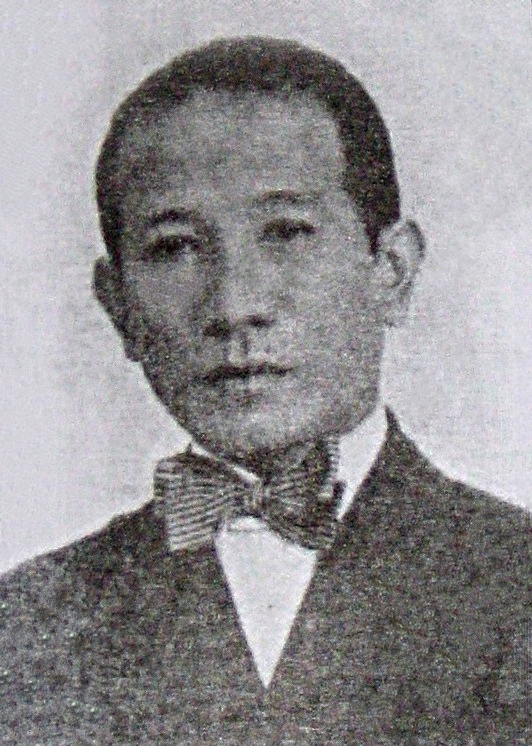
- Andjar, 1930
- Born: Abisin Abbas; 26 February 1902; Alahan Panjang, West Sumatra, Dutch East Indies
- Died: 20 October 1961 (aged 59); Cipanas, West Java, Indonesia
- Known for: Journalism; stage plays; filmmaking
- Spouse: Ratna Asmara

Abisin Abbas (Indonesian pronunciation: [aˌbisɪn ˈabas]; 26 February 1902 – 20 October 1961), better known by his pseudonym Andjar Asmara (Indonesian pronunciation: [ˌaɲd͡ʒar asˈmara]), was a dramatist and filmmaker active in the cinema of the Dutch East Indies. Born in Alahan Panjang, West Sumatra, he first worked as a reporter in Batavia (modern-day Jakarta). He became a writer for the Padangsche Opera in Padang, where he developed a new, dialogue-centric style, which later spread throughout the region. After returning to Batavia in 1929, he spent over a year as a theatre and film critic. In 1930 he joined the Dardanella touring troupe as a writer. He went to India in an unsuccessful bid to film his stage play Dr Samsi.

After leaving Dardanella in 1936, Andjar established his own troupe. He also worked at a publishers, writing serials based on successful films. In 1940 he was asked to join The Teng Chun's company, Java Industrial Film, helping with marketing and working as a director for two productions. After the Japanese occupation, during which time he stayed in theatre, Andjar made a brief return to cinema. He directed three films in the late 1940s and wrote four screenplays, which were produced as films in the early 1950s. He published a novel, Noesa Penida (1950). Afterward he worked for the remainder of his life writing serials based on local films and publishing film criticism. Historians recognise him as a pioneer of theatre and one of the first native Indonesian film directors, although he had little creative control of his productions.

== Early life and theatre ==
Andjar was born Abisin Abbas in Alahan Panjang, West Sumatra, on 26 February 1902. He gravitated toward traditional theatre at a young age after visits from the wandering Wayang Kassim and Juliana Opera stambul troupes; he pretended to act with his friends in stage plays which they had seen. After completing his formal education up to the Meer Uitgebreid Lager Onderwijs (junior high school) level – first in Malay-language schools then Dutch ones – he moved to Batavia (modern-day Jakarta). He worked as a reporter for two daily newspapers, Bintang Timur and Bintang Hindia; he may have also worked on a farm.

Around 1925, having had little success in Batavia, Andjar moved to Padang, where he was a reporter for the daily Sinar Sumatra. At the same time, he worked with the city's Padangsche Opera, writing stage plays. In contrast to the standard musical theatre of the time, bangsawan, he promoted a more natural style, using dialogue instead of song to convey the story; he referred to this as toneel, based on the Dutch word for theatre. Among the works he wrote for the Padangsche Opera were adaptations of Melati van Agam, a 1923 work by Swan Pen, (Note: Pen may have been Parada Harahap, who had been Andjar's editor at Bintang Hindia (I.N. 1981, p. 213).) and Sitti Nurbaya, a 1922 novel by Marah Roesli. These works were well received.

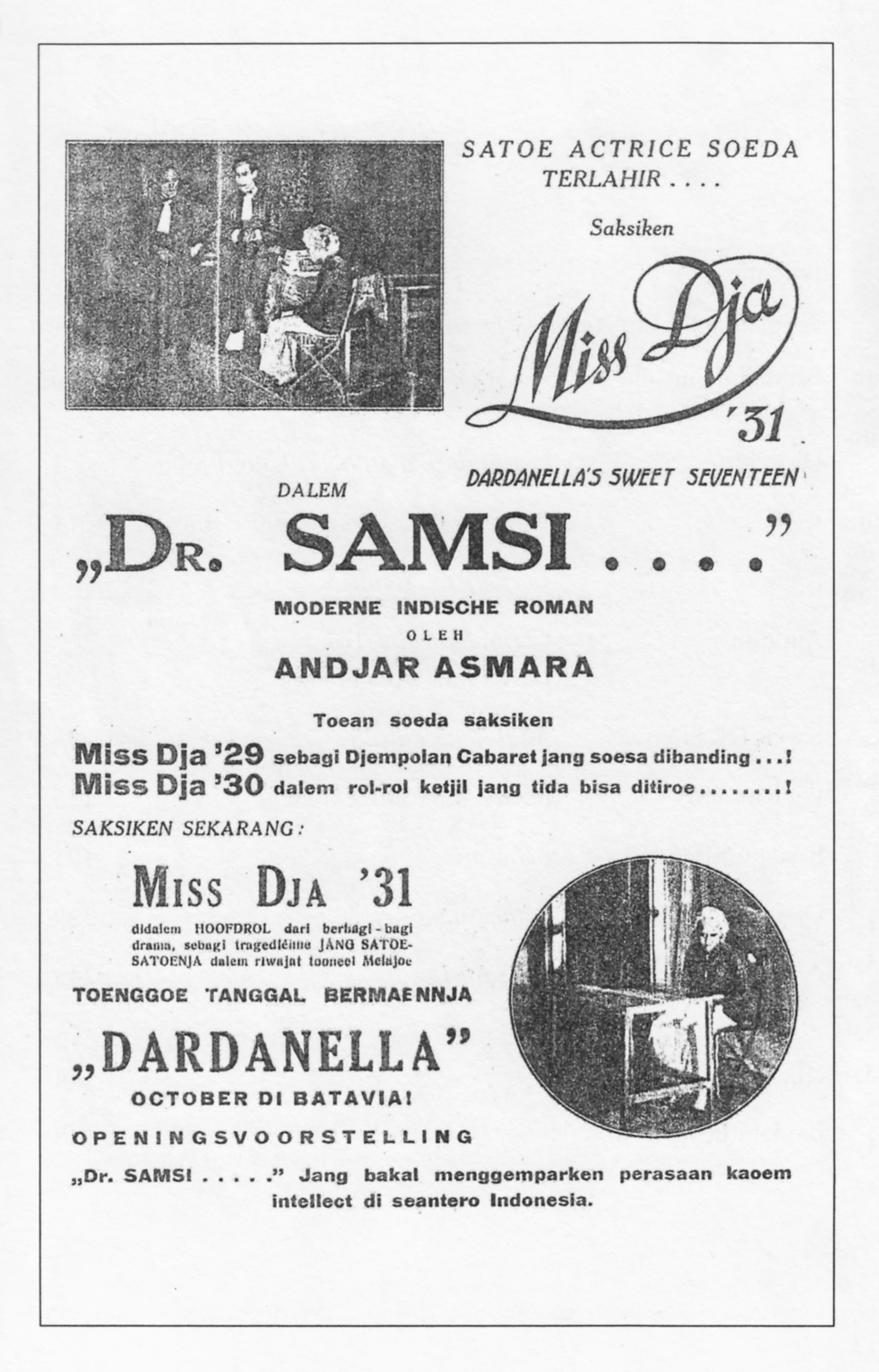
Advertisement for the premiere of Andjar's stageplay, Dr Samsi

In the late 1920s, after spending some two years in Medan with the daily Sinar Soematra, Andjar returned to Batavia and in 1929 helped establish the magazine Doenia Film, a Malay adaptation of the Dutch-language magazine Filmland; although an adaptation, Doenia Film also contained original coverage of the domestic theatre and film industry. At the time, the cinema of the Indies was becoming established: the first domestic film, Loetoeng Kasaroeng (The Lost Lutung), was released in 1926, and four additional films were released in 1927 and 1928. Andjar wrote extensively regarding local cinematic and theatrical productions; for example, the Indonesian film critic Salim Said writes Andjar inspired the marketing for 1929's Njai Dasima, which emphasised the exclusively native cast. (Note: During this period the Indonesian National Awakening was in full force; the year before the Youth Pledge, which affirmed that all natives of the Indonesian archipelago are one people, had been read at the Second Youth Congress (Ricklefs 2001, p. 233).) In 1930 Andjar left Doenia Film and was replaced by Bachtiar Effendi.

Andjar became a writer for the theatrical troupe Dardanella in November 1930, working under the group's founder Willy A. Piedro. (Note: Piedro, the son of a circus performer, was of Russian descent and initially wrote many of Dardanella's stage plays (Biran 2009, pp. 14, 17).) Andjar believed the troupe to be dedicated to the betterment of the toneel as an art form and not only motivated by financial interests, as were the earlier stambul troupes. (Note: In his final letter as editor of Doenia Film, as quoted by Biran (2009, pp. 6, 14, 20), Andjar wrote that he was joining Dardanella to help promote toneel as an art form to the best of his abilities.) He wrote and published many plays with the group's backing, including Dr Samsi and Singa Minangkabau (The Lion of Minangkabau). Andjar also worked as a theatre critic, writing several pieces on the history of local theatre, sometimes using his birth name and sometimes his pseudonym. In 1936 Andjar went with Dardanella to India to record a film adaptation of his drama Dr Samsi, which followed a doctor who was blackmailed after an unscrupulous Indo discovered he had an illegitimate child. The deal fell through, however, and Andjar left India with his wife Ratna.

== Film career and death ==
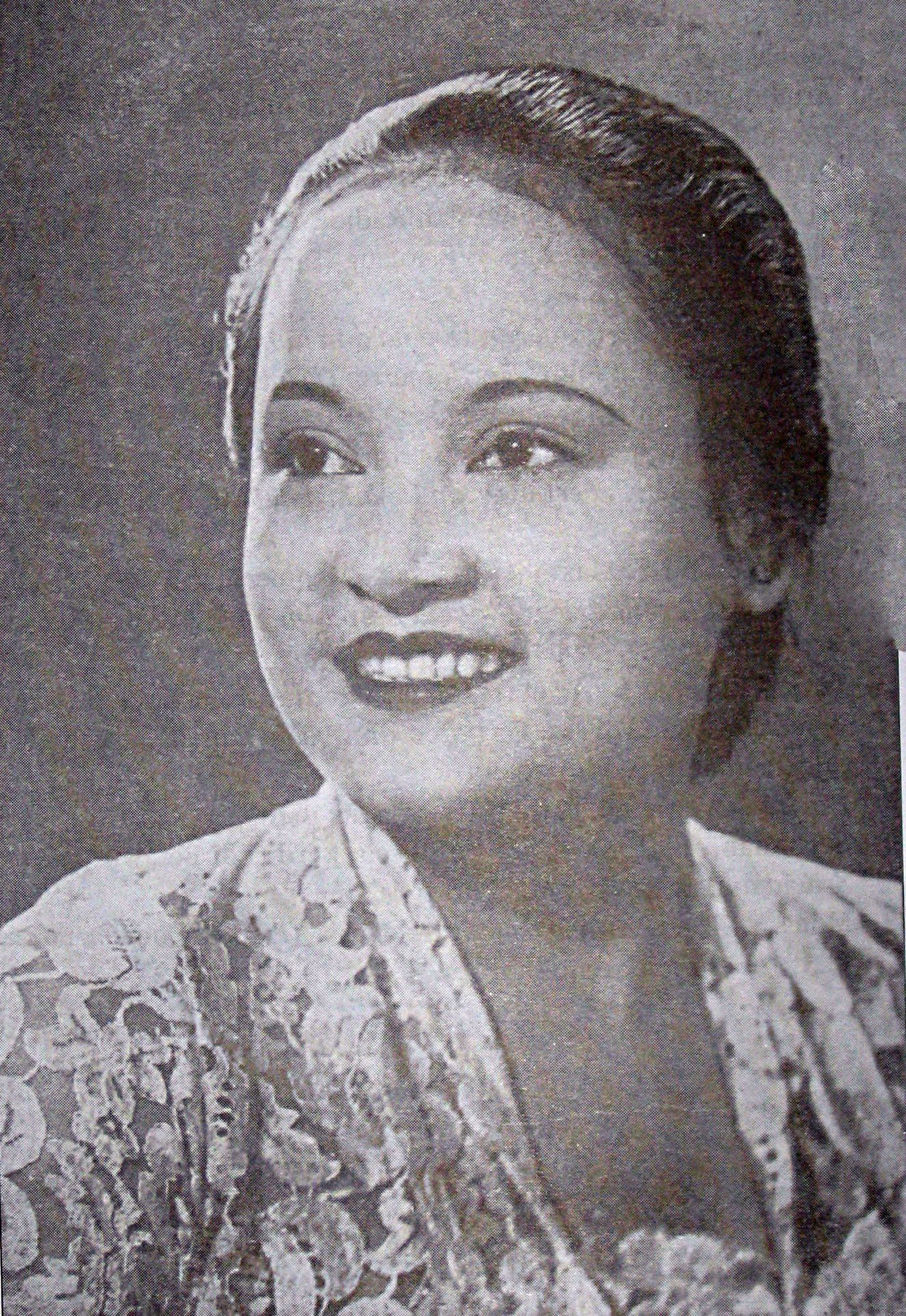
Andjar's wife, Ratna, was the first female film director in Indonesian history.

Upon his return to the Indies, Andjar formed another theatrical troupe, Bolero, with Effendi, but left the troupe around 1940 to work at Kolf Publishers in Surabaya. Effendi was left as the head of Bolero, which then became more politicised. At Kolf Andjar edited the publisher's magazine Poestaka Timoer. As his work entailed writing synopses and serials based on popular films for Kolf's magazine, he became increasingly involved in the film industry. He was soon asked by The Teng Chun, with whom he had maintained a business relationship, to direct a film for his company Java Industrial Film (JIF); with this Andjar became one of several noted theatrical personnel who migrated to film following Albert Balink's 1937 hit Terang Boelan (Full Moon).

After handling the marketing for Rentjong Atjeh (Rencong of Aceh, 1940), Andjar made his directorial debut in 1940 with Kartinah, a war-time romance starring Ratna Asmara. Academia was critical of the film, believing it to lack educational value. In 1941 he directed Noesa Penida, a tragedy based in Bali, for JIF; the film was remade in 1988. In these films, he had little creative control, and performed as what the Indonesian entertainment journalist Eddie Karsito describes as a dialogue coach. Camera angles and locations were chosen by the cinematographer, who was generally also the producer.

During the Japanese occupation from 1942 to 1945, the nation's film industry nearly ceased to exist: all but one studio were closed, and all films released were propaganda pieces to assist the Japanese war effort and promote the Greater East Asia Co-Prosperity Sphere. Andjar was not involved in these but was excited by the artistic merits of Japanese films. Although he wrote several short stories during this time, three of which were published in the pro-Japanese newspaper Asia Raja in 1942, Andjar focused on theatre, forming the troupe Tjahaya Timoer. He often visited the Cultural Centre (Keimin Bunka Sidosho) in Jakarta, where two employees, D. Djajakusuma and Usmar Ismail, discussed filmmaking with him. Both became influential film directors during the 1950s. (Note: Ismail's 1950 film Darah dan Doa (released internationally as The Long March, literally Blood and Prayers) is generally considered the first truly Indonesian film (Biran 2009, p. 45), while Djajakusuma was known for incorporating various aspects of traditional Indonesian culture in his films (Sen & Hill 2000, p. 156).)

After Indonesia's independence, Andjar moved to Purwokerto to lead the daily Perdjoeangan Rakjat. After the paper collapsed, he returned to film, film a piece entitled Djaoeh Dimata for the Netherlands Indies Civil Administration in 1948. This was followed by two additional films, Anggrek Bulan (Moon Orchid; 1948) and Gadis Desa (Maiden from the Village; 1949), both based on plays he wrote several years earlier. In 1950, Andjar published his only novel, Noesa Penida, a critique of the Balinese caste system, which followed lovers from different levels of the social hierarchy. Meanwhile, he continued to write and publish paperback serials adapted from local films.

Andjar's screenplay Dr Samsi was finally adapted as a film in 1952 by Ratna Asmara, who had become Indonesia's first female film director with her 1950 film Sedap Malam (Sweetness of the Night). The adaptation starred Ratna and Raden Ismail. It would prove Andjar's last screenwriting credit during his lifetime. Although no longer writing films, Andjar remained active in the country's film industry. In 1955 he headed the inaugural Indonesian Film Festival, which was criticized when it gave the Best Picture Award to two films, Usmar Ismail's Lewat Djam Malam (After the Curfew) and Lilik Sudjio's Tarmina. Critics wrote that Lewat Djam Malam was easily the stronger of the two and suggested that Djamaluddin Malik, Tarmina's producer, had influenced the jury's decision. (Note: Said (1982, p. 44) writes that Malik had previously influenced a contest for favourite actress in 1954, ensuring that an actress from his company, Persari, was chosen.)

In 1958 Asmara became the head of the entertainment magazine Varia, where the fellow director Raden Ariffien served as his deputy. Asmara held the position until his death; among other roles, he wrote a series of memoires on the history of theatre in the country. He died on 20 October 1961 in Cipanas, West Java, during a trip to Bandung and was buried in Jakarta.

== Legacy ==
Andjar's toneels were generally based on day-to-day experiences, rather than the tales of princes and ancient wars which were standard at the time. Regarding Andjar's toneels, the Indonesian literary critic Bakri Siregar writes that Andjar's stage plays, as well as those of fellow dramatist Njoo Cheong Seng, revitalised the genre and made the works more realistic. However, he considered the conflict in these works to have been poorly developed. Andjar believed that the Padangsche Opera's performances influenced other troupes in West Sumatra to adapt the toneel format, which later spread throughout the Indies.

Matthew Isaac Cohen, a scholar of Indonesian performing arts, describes Andjar as "Indonesia's foremost theater critic during the colonial period", noting that he wrote extensively on the history of theatre in the Indies. Cohen also believes that Andjar also worked to justify the toneel style and distance it from the earlier stambul. Even after entering the film industry, Andjar considered the theatre more culturally significant than cinema. However, the Indonesian journalist Soebagijo I.N. writes that Andjar remains best known for his film work.

Andjar was one of the first native Indonesian film directors, with Bachtiar Effendi, Soeska, and Inoe Perbatasari. (Note: The earliest film directors in the Dutch East Indies, such as L. Heuveldorp, George Krugers, the Wong brothers, and Lie Tek Swie, were either European or ethnic Chinese (Biran 2009, pp. 97, 102)) Said writes that Andjar was forced to follow the whims of the ethnic Chinese film moguls, which resulted in the films' shift toward commercial orientation, rather than the prioritisation of artistic merit. The film historian Misbach Yusa Biran writes that Andjar and his fellow journalists, upon joining JIF, brought with them new ideas that helped the company flourish until it closed after the arrival of the Japanese; the company and its subsidiaries released fifteen films in two years.

== Filmography ==
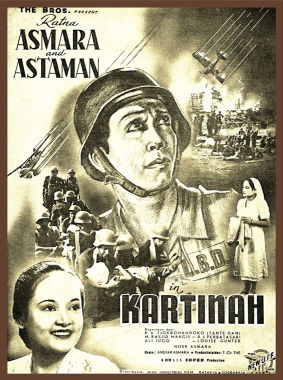
Poster for Kartinah, Andjar's directorial debut

- Booloo (1938) – as story writer
- Kartinah (1940) – as director, scriptwriter, and story writer
- Noesa Penida (1941) – as director and story writer
- Djaoeh Dimata (Out of Sight; 1948) – as director and story writer
- Anggrek Bulan (Moon Orchid; 1948) – as director
- Gadis Desa (Maiden from the Village; 1949) – as director and story writer
- Sedap Malam (Sweetness of the Night; 1950) – as story writer
- Pelarian dari Pagar Besi (Escape from the Iron Fence; 1951) – as story writer
- Musim Bunga di Selabintana (Flowers in Selabintana; 1951) – as story writer
- Dr Samsi (1952) – as story writer
- Noesa Penida (Pelangi Kasih Pandansari) (Noesa Penida [Pandansari's Rainbow of Love]; 1988) – as story writer (posthumous credit)
