= Booloo =

1938 film directed by Clyde E. Elliott

- Directed by: Clyde E. Elliott
- Screenplay by: Robert E. Welsh; Andjar Asmara
- Story by: Clyde E. Elliott
- Produced by: Clyde E. Elliott
- Starring: Colin Tapley; Jayne Regan
- Edited by: Eda Warren
- Music by: Boris Morros
- Production company: Paramount Pictures
- Distributed by: Paramount Pictures
- Release date: July 29, 1938 (US)
- Running time: 60–61 minutes
- Country: United States
- Language: English

Booloo is a 1938 American adventure film directed by Clyde E. Elliott. It stars Colin Tapley as a British soldier who attempts to prove the existence of a legendary tiger.

== Plot ==
Captain Robert Rogers, a British Army officer, publishes a book about his father's exploits. After it is ridiculed as a hoax, Rogers leaves for the Malay Peninsula to prove the existence of Booloo, the legendary tiger that killed his father.

== Cast ==
- Colin Tapley as Captain Robert Rogers
- Jayne Regan as Kate Jaye
- Michio Itō as Sakai chief
- Herbert DeSouza as Rod DeSouza
- Fred Pullen as Nah Laku
- Mamo Clark as Native girl
- Swiatna Asmara as Native girl
- Claude King as Major Fenton

== Production ==
In August 1937, Paramount signed a contract with Indonesian dramatist, Andjar Asmara, as a screenwriter after the last show of his theatrical troupe Bolero in Medan, and goes to Singapore on 14 August. They gave Andjar's wife, Ratna, a role as Sakai girl who was sacrificed in a ritual sacrifice to a white tiger.

Paramount wanted another jungle adventure film after The Jungle Princess proved popular, and they recruited Clyde E. Elliott to shoot a film in Singapore. Elliott's two previous Malayan films, Bring 'Em Back Alive and Devil Tiger, had been criticized for lacking authenticity. Booloo addressed these concerns by using Asian actors when available. The film was half complete on 4 March 1938. However, Paramount cut much of the footage starring these actors and reshot scenes in Hollywood as the scene between Colin Tapley and Ratna would be too real for audience and against Hays Code anti-miscegenation. For example, the role of a native girl, originally played by Ratna was recast to a Hawaiian actress, Mamo Clark, but Ratna was still credited as Swiatna Asmara with the wrong name which is included to sell the name because it comes from an exotic region.

== Release ==
Paramount released Booloo in the US on July 29, 1938.

== Reception and legacy ==
Booloo received negative reviews, which criticized the story and editing. Frank Nugent of The New York Times called it "an exciting and quite entertaining blend of the real and the make-believe". Even though her scene had been cut, Ratna Asmara remain as the first Malay representation in Hollywood.

== Citations ==
=== Works cited ===
- Erkelens, Jaap (2022). Dardanella, perintis teater Indonesia modern: duta kesenian Indonesia melanglang buana (in Indonesian). Penerbit Buku Kompas. ISBN 978-623-346-197-9.
- Anisah, Umi Lestari, Julita Pratiwi, Efi Sri Handayani, Imelda Taurina Mandala, Lisabona Rahman, Siti (2022). Lusandiana, Lisistrata (ed.). Ratna Asmara Perempuan di Dua Sisi Kamera (in Indonesian). Yogyakarta: Indonesian Visual Art Archive. ISBN 978-602-51638-5-2.
