= Mamo Clark =

American actress

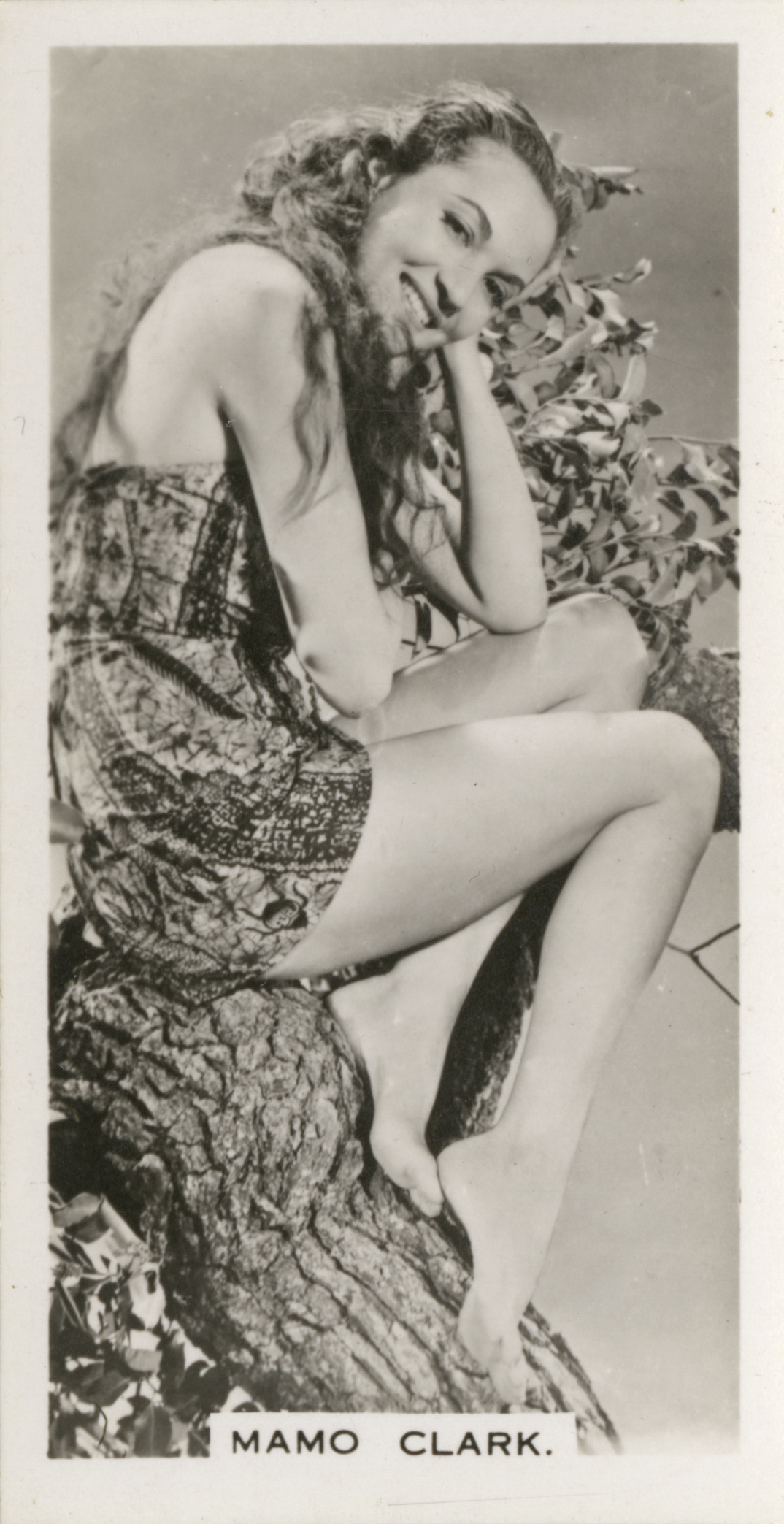
- Clark in a studio portrait
- Born: Marguerite Mamo Clark; December 6, 1914; Honolulu, Hawaii, U.S.
- Died: December 18, 1986 (aged 72); Panorama City, California, U.S.
- Other name: Mamo
- Education: University of California, Los Angeles 1965
- Years active: 1935–1940
- Spouse: James M. Rawley
- Children: 1

Marguerite Mamo Clark (December 6, 1914 – December 18, 1986), sometimes billed as Mamo, was an American actress and author.

== Early life ==
Marguerite Mamo Clark was born on December 6, 1914, in Honolulu, Hawaii. On July 1, 1933, Clark sailed to the mainland United States on the SS Malolo with her stepmother, May Kaaolani Clark, and father, Joseph Kealakaimana Clark. Her stepmother was the daughter of John Adams Cummins. Her biological mother was Evelina Mahoe. Both her mother and stepmother were descendants of 15th-century Hawaiian chief Liloa and distant relatives of Kamehameha I.

== Film career ==
She made her film debut in a featured role in Mutiny on the Bounty (1935) as Miamiti, Fletcher Christian's (Clark Gable) wife in the film. The following year she appeared in the serial Robinson Crusoe of Clipper Island as a Polynesian princess. In 1937, she appeared with Mutiny on the Bounty co-star Movita in The Hurricane. Clark played roles in several B-pictures with Pacific Island settings, for instance Hawaii Calls (1938).

One Million B.C. (1940) provided her with a substantial role as the "Queen of the Rock Tribe" appearing with Lon Chaney Jr. The same year she appeared in the film The Girl From God's Country. She retired from films after a minor role in the Marlene Dietrich and John Wayne film Seven Sinners (1940).

== Personal life ==
Clark married U.S. Army Captain James Rawley and had a son, James Rawley Jr. After marriage, she retired from show business and went back to school, earning a degree from UCLA in 1965.

Clark died on December 18, 1986.

== Filmography ==
Year	Title	Role	Notes
1935	Mutiny on the Bounty	Maimiti	
1936	Robinson Crusoe of Clipper Island	Princess Melani	
1937	The Hurricane	Hitia	
1937	Wallaby Jim of the Islands	Lana	
1938	Hawaii Calls	Hina	
1938	Air Devils	Lolano	
1938	Booloo	Native Girl	
1938	Mutiny on the Blackhawk	Mamo	
1940	One Million B.C.	Nupondi	
1940	Girl from God's Country	Mrs. Bearfat Tillicoot	
1940	Seven Sinners	Native Girl at Antro's Table	Uncredited
