= Balinese caste system =

Traditional social stratification

The Balinese caste system is a social classification system traditionally found among the Hindu population of Bali, Indonesia. Known locally as wangsa or varna, it differs significantly in origin, structure, and social function from the caste systems of India, despite sharing some Sanskrit-derived terminology. In Bali, caste has historically played a role in ritual status, naming conventions, language use, and religious responsibilities.

== Caste Groupings ==
Balinese society is traditionally divided into four broad categories, often referred to collectively as catur wangsa (“four lineages”):

- Brahmana (Brahmins) – Traditionally associated with priestly functions and religious scholarship. Brahmana families historically supplied high priests (pedanda) who officiate major rituals.
- Satria or Ksatria (Kshatriyas) – Associated with royal lineages, nobility, and former ruling houses. Many Balinese kings and aristocrats belonged to this group.
- Wesia (Vaishyas) - A smaller and less clearly defined group historically linked to administration and commerce.
- Sudras (Shudras) – The majority of the population (93%), encompassing farmers, artisans, and village-based communities.

These categories are not equivalent to the Indian varna system. In Bali, Sudra status does not imply ritual impurity, social exclusion, or restricted access to religious life. Sudra individuals fully participate in temple rituals and communal religious obligations.

Pre-modern Bali had four castes, as Jeff Lewis and Belinda Lewis state, but with a "very strong tradition of communal decision-making and interdependence".

Balinese caste structure has been described in early 20th-century European literature to be based on three categories – triwangsa (three classes) or the nobility, dwijati (twice-born) in contrast to ekajati (once born) the common folks. Four statuses were identified in these sociological studies, spelled a bit differently from the caste categories for India:

European enthographers split subdivided castes such as the Brahmana into two: Siwa and Buda. The Siwa caste was subdivided into five – Kemenuh, Keniten, Mas, Manuba, and Petapan. This classification was to accommodate the observed marriage between higher caste Brahmana men with lower caste women. The other castes were similarly further sub-classified by these 19th-century and early-20th-century ethnographers based on numerous criteria ranging from profession, endogamy or exogamy or polygamy, and a host of other factors in a manner similar to caste system studies in British colonies such as India.

== Origins and historical development ==
Balinese social stratification developed through a combination of indigenous Austronesian social structures and later Hindu-Javanese influences, particularly during the Majapahit period (14th–16th centuries). When Hindu-Javanese elites migrated to Bali following the decline of Majapahit, they brought elements of court culture, ritual hierarchy, and Brahmanical traditions. These were adapted to existing Balinese social and religious frameworks rather than imposed wholesale.

19th-century scholars such as Crawfurd and Friederich suggested that the Balinese caste system had Indian origins, but Helen Creese states that scholars such as Brumund who had visited and stayed on the island of Bali suggested that his field observations conflicted with the "received understandings concerning its Indian origins".

Most Ksatria families trace their ancestral liniage to Majapahit and the royal family of King Sri Aji Kresna Kepakisan. Some of the original Ksatria such as those claiming descent from Arya Damar, were relegated to Wesia status.

During the 1950s and 1960s, there were conflicts between supporters of the traditional caste system in Bali and its opponents. Many of the latter were affiliated with the PKI, the Communist Party of Indonesia, which was violently suppressed during the Indonesian killings of 1965–1966, leading to the death of some 80,000 Balinese, around 5% of the population at the time.

== Naming Conventions ==
Caste affiliation in Bali is most visibly expressed through personal names. High-caste individuals often use titles such as Ida Bagus, Ida Ayu, Anak Agung, Cokorda, or Dewa. Sudra Balinese typically use birth-order names such as Wayan, Made, Nyoman, and Ketut.

Naming conventions remain culturally significant but are increasingly treated as markers of heritage rather than indicators of social rank.

== Language and social interaction ==
The Balinese language has several speech levels (alus, madya, kasar), historically influenced by caste distinctions. Higher levels of speech are traditionally used when addressing higher-caste individuals or in formal ritual contexts. Middle Balinese is generally used to speak to people whose caste is unknown in an encounter. Once the caste status of the participants are established, the proper language is used to address each other. In modern Bali, these linguistic distinctions are more closely associated with politeness, formality, and context rather than strict caste hierarchy, and their everyday use has declined particularly with the ubiquity of the national language Bahasa Indonesia.

== Marriage and social mobility ==
Inter-caste marriage has historically occurred in Bali and has never been absolutely prohibited. While social conventions once discouraged unions in which a woman married into a lower caste, such restrictions have weakened substantially. Today, caste plays a minimal role in marriage decisions for most Balinese, particularly in urban and educated communities.

Social mobility has long been possible in Bali through royal service, religious authority, and community leadership, further distinguishing the Balinese system from rigid caste structures elsewhere.

== Religion and ritual ==
Balinese Hinduism emphasises communal temple worship, ancestor veneration, and village-level ritual cooperation. Participation in religious life is determined primarily by village membership (banjar) and temple affiliation rather than caste.

While certain priestly roles remain hereditary within Brahmana families, many religious functions are carried out by non-Brahmana ritual specialists, reflecting the pluralistic nature of Balinese religious practice. In most regions, it is the Sudra who typically make offerings to the gods on behalf of the Hindu devotees, chant prayers, recite meweda (Vedas), and set the course of Balinese temple festivals.

== Modern developments ==
According to cultural scholar Jean Couteau, traditional caste identities in Balinese Hinduism have become increasingly fluid in the contemporary era. With the decline of agrarian society and the collapse of the old princely political order under Dutch colonial rule, the historical functions of the caturwangsa (the four caste groupings) and extended kinship units (wargas) have weakened, becoming less central to social organisation and influence.

Economic growth, access to modern education, and increased social mobility have allowed individuals from historically lower groups to challenge traditional hierarchies, including entry into priestly roles previously dominated by Brahmana families. In this context, caste status has increasingly been overshadowed by wealth, education, and professional achievement, contributing to the emergence of a class-based social hierarchy.

Reformist interpretations of Hinduism argued that caste should reflect personal vocation and religious commitment rather than inherited status. Under this view, priesthood and ritual authority are achieved through training and initiation, not birth. This interpretation was formally adopted by the Parisada Hindu Dharma Indonesia, which ruled that eligibility for high priesthood (dwijati) depends on education and completion of the appropriate initiation (medwijati), rather than descent from a Brahmana family. As a result, alongside hereditary Brahmana priests (pedanda), new categories of priests emerged, including Rsi, Empu, and Begawan, often serving specific clans or communities. These reforms were not universally accepted. Opposition from traditional Brahmana groups led to institutional division within Hindu religious governance in Bali. Nevertheless, open conflict has been rare, and in practice hereditary and non-hereditary priests frequently officiate together.

Couteau also notes external influences on these changes, including the spread of ideas associated with European modernity—such as progress and egalitarian rights—and the presence of non-Hindu religious communities whose social structures differ from Balinese caste norms. Additionally, renewed engagement with Indian Hindu reform movements has encouraged some Balinese to reinterpret caste through spiritual ideals drawn from Vedic concepts of four varnas, emphasising vocation and personal qualities over inherited status.

Overall, caste has diminished in everyday social interaction, language use, and legal status, though in certain ritual or political contexts inherited status may still reassert significance.

== See also ==
- Balinese Hinduism
- Balinese Kshatriya
- Caste
