= Dardanella (theatre company) =

Indonesian theatre company

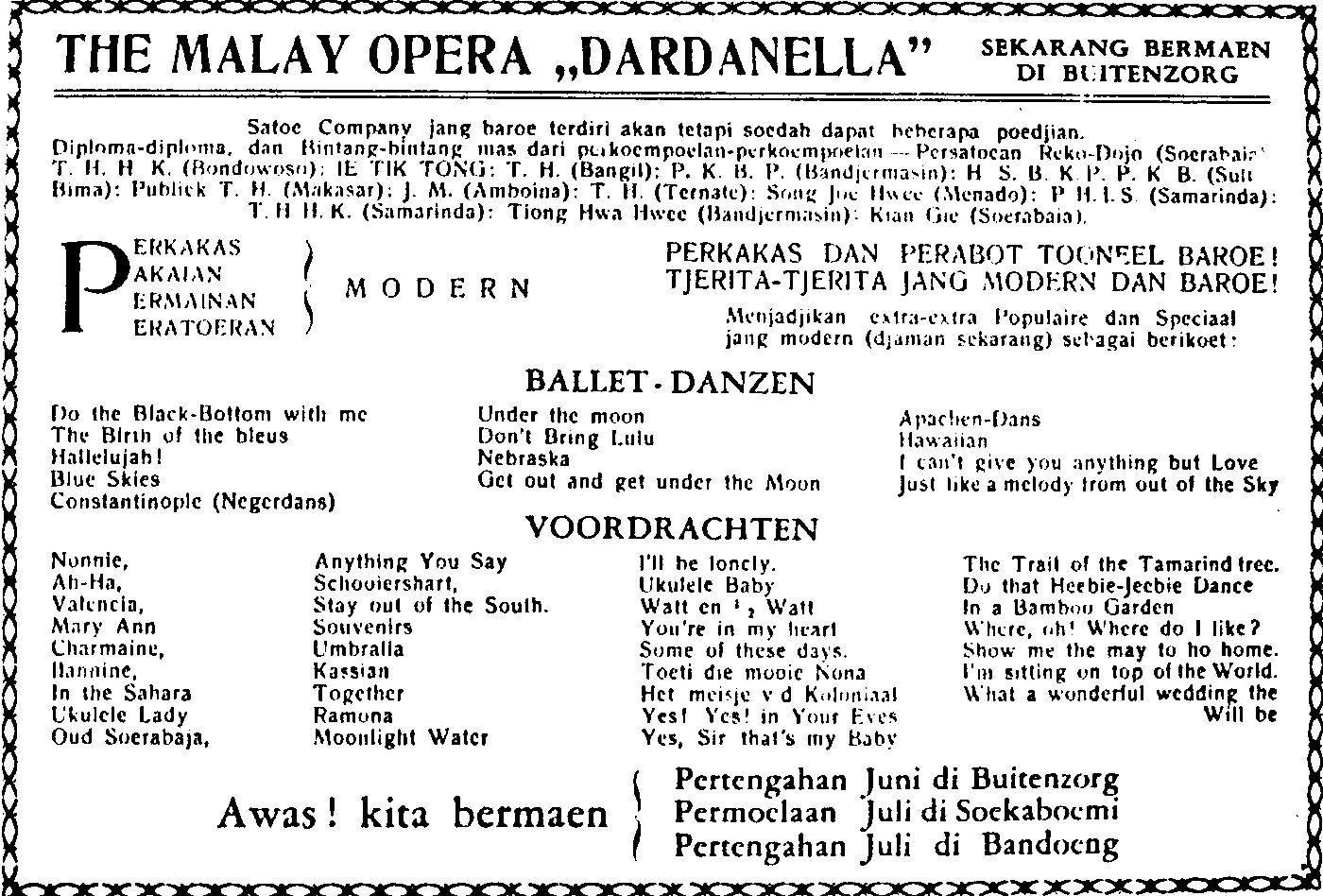
Advertisement for a Dardanella performance, 1929

Dardanella was a touring theatre company from the Dutch East Indies (modern-day Indonesia) established by Willy A. Piedro in 1926. Arising from a background of musical theatre, the troupe focused on realistic stories, both adaptations of foreign works and original stage plays about life in the Indies. Starring Dewi Dja' and Tan Tjeng Bok, the troupe performed original works by Piedro and Andjar Asmara. Popular both in the Indies and abroad, Dardanella dissolved during an international tour after 1936. Several of its members later went into film.

== Background ==
In the late 19th and early 20th centuries, the theatre in the Dutch East Indies (modern-day Indonesia) generally emphasised music, with the dialogue being sung. These early performances were given different names depending on their type, such as bangsawan and komedi stambul. In the mid-1920s companies in the country began adapting more European stylings, with an emphasis on spoken dialogue and a reduction in the amount of music used during the performance; troupes using this new format referred to the genre as toneel, an adaptation of the Dutch word for theatre.

== Career ==
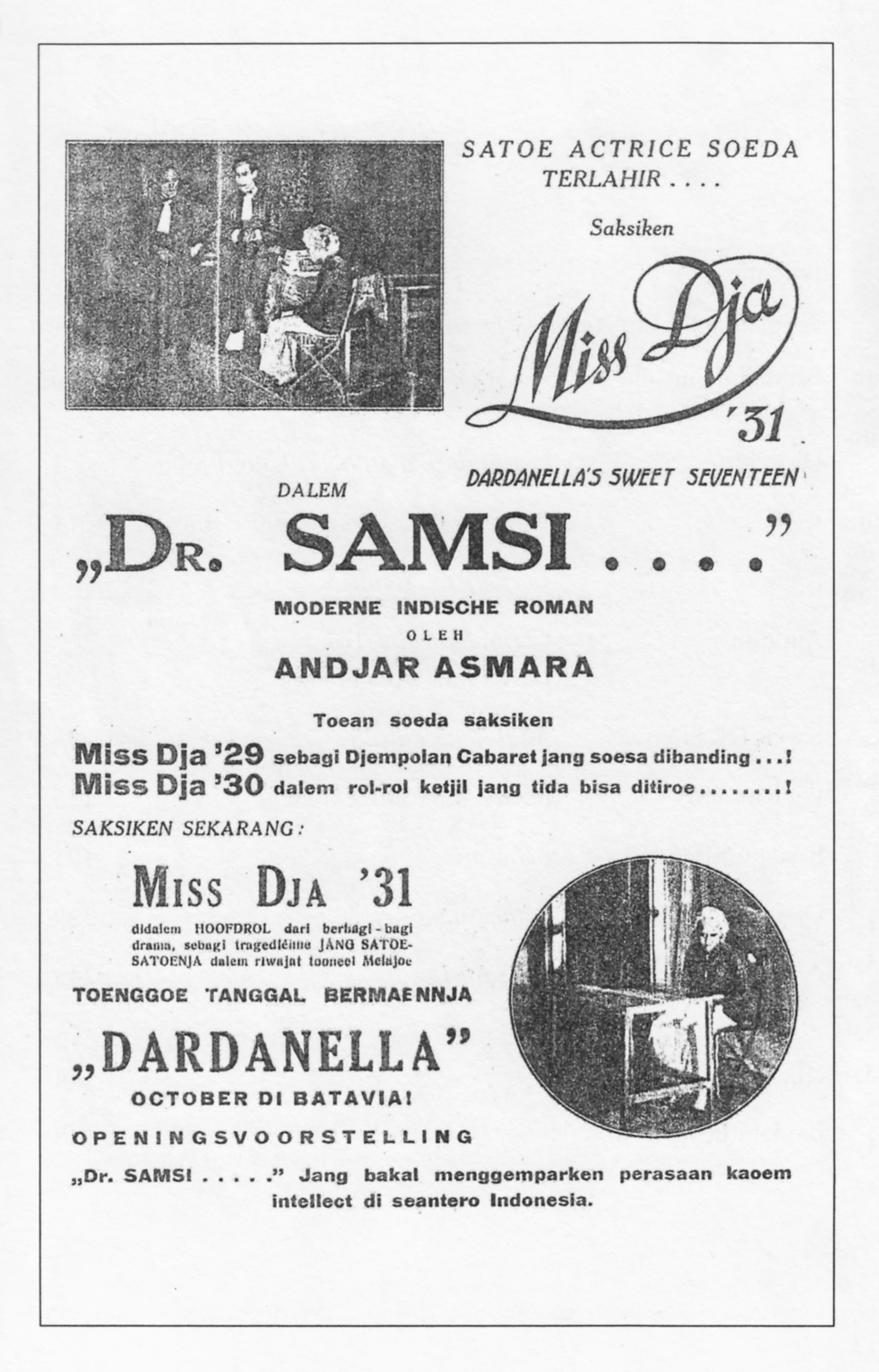
Advertisement for the premiere of Dr Samsi; the play became Dardanella's most popular.

Dardanella was established by Willy A. Piedro (born Willy Klimanoff), a Penang-born actor of Russian descent. His native wife, Devi Dja, joined as an actor; another early member was Tan Tjeng Bok, an ethnic Chinese keroncong singer who was known for his sword work, Ferry Kock, and Astaman; many of these actors had been in other troupes before. The troupe gave their first performance on 21 June 1926 in Sidoarjo, East Java. They were advertised as a toneel troupe to indicate their affinity for European stage traditions.

Initially the troupe's works were written by Piedro. He adapted numerous Hollywood productions for the stage, including The Mark of Zorro (1920), The Three Musketeers (1921), The Thief of Bagdad (1924), and Don Q, Son of Zorro (1925). These adaptations generally starred Tan Tjeng Bok, who earned the nickname "Douglas Fairbanks of Java" ("Douglas Fairbanks van Java") for his work. Piedro also wrote his own stage plays based on everyday life in the Indies (mostly in Java), such as Roos van Serang, Fatima, and North of Borneo.

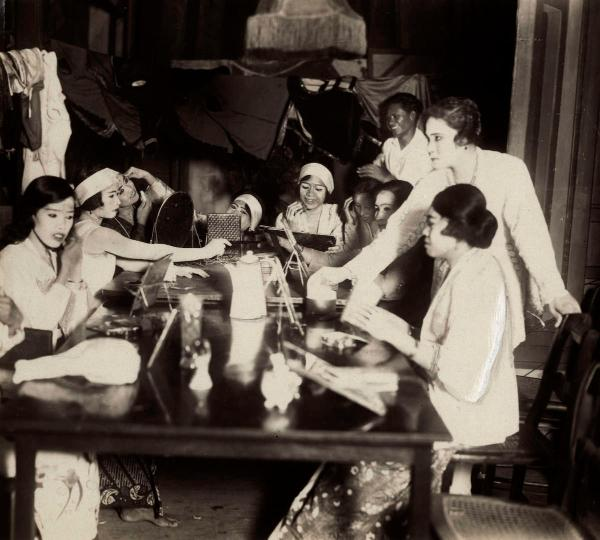
Dardanella theatre troupe in a dressing room (Het Leven, 6 December 1930)

The group attracted the theatre and film critic Andjar Asmara in late 1929; he left his publication Doenia Film to join as a publicity and press role, as he believed the troupe dedicated to the betterment of the toneel as an art form and not only motivated by financial interests like the earlier stambul troupes. Andjar's wife Ratna also joined. He numerous wrote stage plays for the troupe, generally dealing with more serious and mature topics than Piedro; these were in part aimed at the growing intellectual native population.

Dardanella began losing its popularity in the early 1930s. In 1936 Dardanella went to India to record a film adaptation of Andjar's Dr Samsi, which followed a doctor who was blackmailed after an unscrupulous Indo discovered he had an illegitimate child. This plan was not brought to fruition, and afterwards Piedro, Dja', and some thirty-odd players went to the United States via Egypt and Europe, soon disbanding. Meanwhile, Andjar and Ratna Asmara returned to the Indies, establishing their own troupe named Bollero with Bachtiar Effendi, who had joined Dardanella shortly before its dissolution.

In the 1940s numerous former Dardanella actors and personnel entered the film industry, including Andjar and Ratna Asmara, as well as Ferry Kock and his wife Dewi Mada. Several stage plays used by the troupe were also adapted to film, including Rentjong Atjeh (Rencong of Aceh; 1940), and Gadis Desa (Maiden from the Village; 1949).

== Style and reception ==
Their plays were presented in Malay and often adapted works by other writers. Some works, such as those by Victor Ido, were translated from the original when adapted for stage. Dardanella and its contemporary rival Miss Riboet's Orion – established a year before – were some of the first travelling troupes in the Indies to use original works; earlier bangsawan and stambul troupes had used broad outlines of foreign works. The two were the most popular troupes from the Indies of their time.

A review in The Straits Times following a performance of The Worshippers of Papua in 1935 found the troupe's performances comparable to those of European theatrical acts and notes that large European audiences attended the shows. The reviewer described the show as "entertaining [audiences] in a way they had never been entertained before".

The Indonesian cultural critic Hairus Salim HS notes that Dardanella's use of Malay in a time of increased nationalism worked to unite the different peoples of the archipelago with a single language; he also cites the diverse cultural background of its players as presenting a single but varied Indonesian identity.
