= Darussalam (actor) =

Indonesian actor (1920–1993)

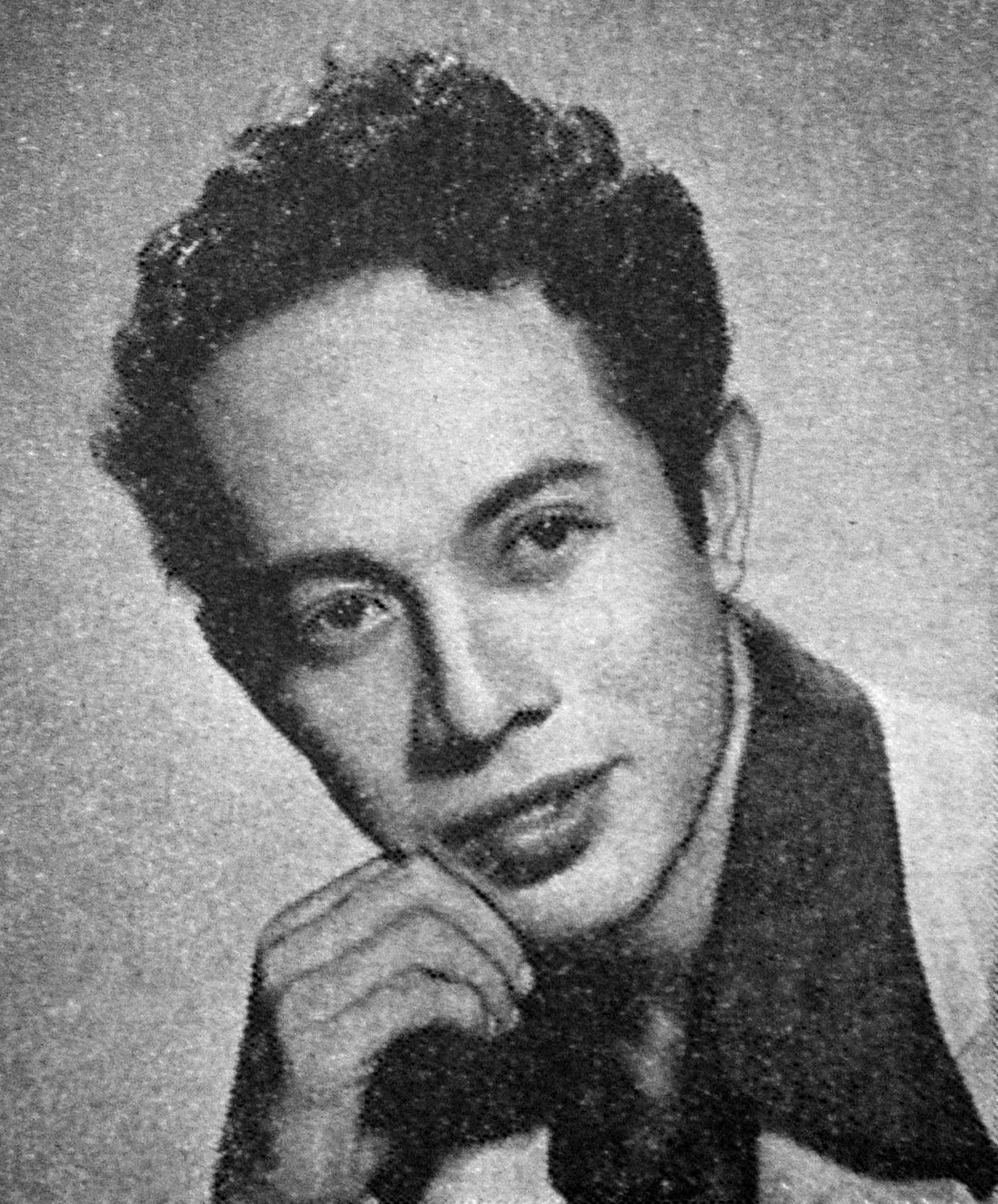
- Darussalam, 1954
- Born: 12 September 1920; Bengkulu, Dutch East Indies
- Died: 26 April 1993 (aged 72); Jakarta, Indonesia
- Occupation: Actor
- Spouse: Netty Herawaty
- Relatives: Miss Riboet Muda (mother-in-law)
- Awards: 1 Citra Award

Darussalam (12 September 1920 – 26 April 1993) was an Indonesian actor who appeared in more than seventy films in his forty-year career. Born in Bengkulu, he studied to be nurse before migrating to theatre during the Japanese occupation of the Dutch East Indies, marrying Netty Herawaty while with the troupe Irama Masa. The couple spent the remainder of the occupation and the ensuing revolution touring the archipelago with a number of troupes. In 1949, Darussalam and Herawaty made their feature film debut in Fred Young's Saputangan, appearing in seven further Young productions before migrating to Djamaluddin Malik's Persari. During their eight years with the company, Darussalam and Herawaty travelled to the Philippines and Singapore and found popularity among audiences, though Darussalam remained in his wife's shadow.

Following the closure of Persari in 1958, Darussalam returned to theatre, establishing a troupe named after Herawaty. He only returned to the film in the 1970s, appearing in more than thirty films between 1971 and 1988. He also starred in two television serials, Senyum Jakarta (1972–1980) and Keluarga Pak Darus (1982–1988). For his role in Kodrat (1986), Darussalam received the Citra Award for Best Supporting Actor; he was nominated for another one the following year for Ayahku.

== Early life ==
Darussalam was born in Bengkulu, a city in Sumatra, Dutch East Indies, on 12 September 1920. He completed his elementary studies at a Dutch-run school for native Indonesians before continuing on to a MULO (junior-high school). Though he dropped out in his second year, Darussalam was able to become a nurse. After two years in the profession, in 1938 he left for the colonial capital of Batavia, where he completed four years of nursing studies at the Centrale Burgerlijke Ziekeninrichting (now Cipto Mangunkusumo Hospital).

Following the Japanese occupation of the Dutch East Indies, Darussalam became a teacher. He also entered the theatre, at first with Irama Masa, a theatrical company established by occupation government. While with this group he met Netty Herawaty, an actress with the company ten years his junior. The two were soon married; according to an interview with Kentjana magazine, they fell in love while on a boat bringing Irama Masa back from Makassar. By 1953 the couple had one child, a daughter named Rustiany.

In 1945, shortly following the proclamation of Indonesian independence, Darussalam established his own troupe, Trimurti, together with Herawaty. The troupe toured Java during the Indonesian National Revolution and supported the Indonesians fighting against the returning Dutch colonial forces. The company had collapsed by 1947, however, and Darussalam and Herawaty joined Djamaluddin Malik's Bintang Timur. By 1949 they were working with Fred Young's Bintang Soerabaja.

== Bintang Surabaja and Persari ==
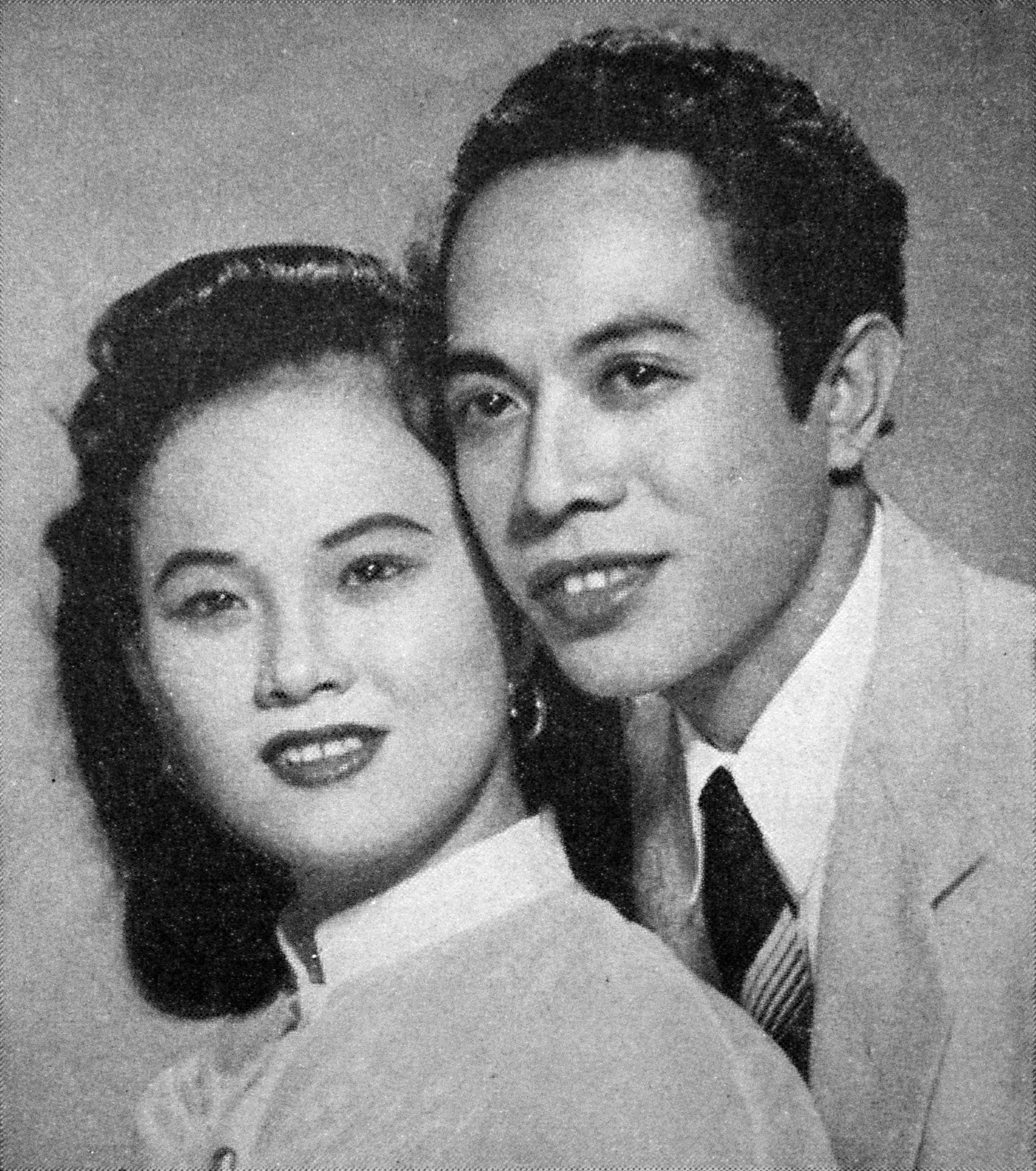
Darussalam and his wife Netty Herawaty, 1954

Young, who had owned the film production company Majestic Pictures before the war, returned to the cinema in 1949. He established the Bintang Surabaja Film Corporation and adapted several of his troupe's stage plays into film. Darussalam and Herawaty made their feature film debut in Young's Saputangan (1949), based on the stage play of the same name. The couple stayed with Bintang Surabaja for two years, appearing in seven further films for the company, including Bintang Surabaja 1951 (1950), Djembatan Merah (1950), and Selamat Berdjuang, Masku! (1951).

In this time, Malik had established his own film company, Persari. Darussalam and Herawaty had migrated there by 1951, establishing themselves with roles in such films as Sepandjang Malioboro (1951) and Bakti Bahagia (1951). In 1952, Darussalam was among the Persari actors and crew sent to the Philippines to study film. During their nearly two years in the country, the group made two Ansco Colour films in collaboration with LVN Studio. The first of these, the Indonesian version of Rodrigo de Villa (1952), featured Herawaty as the film's female lead, opposite Rd Mochtar; Darussalam was given a supporting role.

Upon the group's return to Indonesia, Darussalam appeared in such Persari films as Gara-gara Hadiah (1953) and Air Pasang (1954). By 1954 he was considered part of the company's "Big Four", together with Herawaty, Titien Sumarni and Rd Mochtar, though the Indonesian film historian Misbach Yusa Biran writes that he remained in Herawaty's shadow. In mid-1954 Darussalam and Herawaty were sent to Singapore to build connections between Persari and Keris Film Productions; they ultimately produced three films while there.

== Later life and career ==
In mid-1957, Malik was accused of corruption and placed under house arrest. The following year Persari was closed and its staff dispersed. Darussalam thus returned to theatre with Herawaty. In 1958 he established his own troupe, the Herawaty National Theatre, with Herawaty as the troupe's star. Aside from one performance, in 1960's Ibu Mertua, Darussalam remained off the screen until being cast in Malin Kundang (1971), a film produced by Malik's widow Elly Yunara. Over the following decade Darussalam appeared in over a dozen films, including Jembatan Merah (1973), Surat Undangan (1975), and Pembalasan Si Pitung. Together with Herawaty, as well as actors such as Fifi Young and Tan Tjeng Bok, he starred in the television serial Senyum Jakarta. The show lasted from 1972 to 1980.

Darussalam remained active on television for much of the 1980s, headlining the serial Keluarga Pak Darus (1982–1988). He also appeared in more than twenty films, including Titian Serambut Dibelah Tujuh (1982), Pengantin Pantai Biru (1983), and several Warkop films. For his role in Kodrat, Darussalam received the Citra Award for Best Supporting Actor. Herawaty died in 1989, the same year that Darussalam received the Surjosoemanto Award from the National Film Council. Darussalam died four years later, on 26 April 1993.

== Awards ==
Darussalam won a Citra Award for Best Supporting Actor at the 1987 Indonesian Film Festival for his performance as Mustakim in Kodrat. The following year, he was nominated for another Citra Award for Best Supporting Actor for his acting in Ayahku, but lost to Didi Petet (Cinta Anak Jaman).

| Award | Year | Category | Film | Result |
|---|---|---|---|---|
| Indonesian Film Festival | 1987 | Best Supporting Actor | Kodrat | Won |
| Indonesian Film Festival | 1988 | Best Supporting Actor | Ayahku | Nominated |

== Filmography ==
In his nearly forty-year career, Darussalam appeared in some seventy-seven films.

- Saputangan (1949)
- Bintang Surabaja 1951 (1950)
- Damarwulan (1950)
- Djembatan Merah (1950)
- Harumanis (1950)
- Ratapan Ibu (1950)
- Bakti Bahagia (1951)
- Main-Main Djadi Sungguhan (1951)
- Sepandjang Malioboro (1951)
- Surjani Mulia (1951)
- Terbelenggu (1951)
- Selamat Berdjuang, Masku! (1951)
- Rodrigo de Villa (1952)
- Ajah Kikir (1953)
- Gara-gara Hadiah (1953)
- Air Pasang (1954)
- Irama Kasih (1954)
- Saudaraku (1955)
- Duka Nestapa (1955)
- Djandjiku (1956)
- Harta Angker (1956)
- Pemetjahan Poligami (1956)
- Buruh Bengkel (1956)
- Tudjuan (1956)
- Konsepsi Ajah (1957)
- Sendja Indah (1957)
- Ibu Mertua (1960)
- Malin Kundang (1971)
- Mawar Rimba (1972)
- Bila Cinta Bersemi (1972)
- Sisa-sisa Laskar Pajang (1972)
- Jembatan Merah (1973)
- Ratapan Anak Tiri (1973)
- Mencari Ayah (1974)
- Surat Undangan (1975)
- Sebelum Usia 17 (1975)
- Ranjang Siang Ranjang Malam (1976)
- Wajah Tiga Perempuan (1976)
- Badai Pasti Berlalu (1977)
- Cinta Bersemi (1977)
- Darah Daging (1977)
- Santara Menumpas Perdagangan Sex (1977)
- Kemelut Hidup (1977)
- Pembalasan si Pitung (Jiih) (1977)
- Letnan Harahap (1977)
- Cinta Putih (Bidan Aminah) (1977)
- Istri Dulu Istri Sekarang (1978)
- Napas Perempuan (1978)
- Sayang Sayangku Sayang (1978)
- Kisah Cinta Tommi dan Jerri (1980)
- Fajar yang Kelabu (1981)
- Si Pitung Beraksi Kembali (1981)
- Aduh Aduh Mana Tahan (1980)
- Detik-detik Cinta Menyentuh (1981)
- Apa Ini Apa Itu (1981)
- Enak Benar Jadi Jutawan (1982)
- Gadis Bionik (1982)
- Serbuan Halilintar (1982)
- Perkawinan 83 (1982)
- Pengantin Remaja II (1982)
- Titian Serambut Dibelah Tujuh (1982)
- Pengantin Pantai Biru (1983)
- Dilihat Boleh Dipegang Jangan (1983)
- Sorga Dunia di Pintu Neraka (1983)
- Pokoknya Beres (1983)
- Bergola Ijo (1983)
- Tinggal Landas Buat Kekasih (1984)
- Pelangi di Balik Awan (1984)
- Untukmu Kuserahkan Segalanya (1984)
- Kejarlah Daku Kau Kutangkap (1985)
- Tak Ingin Sendiri (1985)
- Tak Seindah Kasih Mama (1986)
- Takdir Marina (1986)
- Kodrat (1986)
- Ayahku (1987)
- Istana Kecantikan (1988)
- Omong Besar (1988)

== Works cited ==
- Apa Siapa Orang Film Indonesia [What and Who: Film Figures in Indonesia] (in Indonesian). Jakarta: Indonesian Ministry of Information. 1999. OCLC 44427179.
- Biran, Misbach Yusa, ed. (1979). Apa Siapa Orang Film Indonesia 1926–1978 [What and Who: Film Figures in Indonesia, 1926–1978]. Jakarta: Sinematek Indonesia. OCLC 6655859.
- Biran, Misbach Yusa (2009a). Sejarah Film 1900–1950: Bikin Film di Jawa [History of Film 1900–1950: Making Films in Java] (in Indonesian). Jakarta: Komunitas Bamboo working with the Jakarta Art Council. ISBN 978-979-3731-58-2.
- Biran, Misbach Yusa (2009b). Peran Pemuda dalam Kebangkitan Film Indonesia [The Role of the Youth in the Development of the Indonesian Film Industry] (in Indonesian). Jakarta: Ministry of Youth and Sports. OCLC 607257806.
- "Darussalam – Filmografi" [Darussalam – Filmography]. filmindonesia.or.id (in Indonesian). Jakarta: Konfiden Foundation. Archived from the original on 11 August 2016.
- "Darussalam – Penghargaan" [Darussalam – Awards]. filmindonesia.or.id (in Indonesian). Konfiden Foundation. Archived from the original on 11 August 2016.
- Kristanto, JB, ed. (2007). Katalog Film Indonesia 1926– 2007. Jakarta: Nalar. ISBN 978-979-26-9006-4.
- "Netty Herawaty, Kehidupannja Sehari-Hari" [Netty Herawaty, Her Day-to-Day Life]. Kentjana (in Indonesian). 1 (1). Jakarta: 4–5. August 1953.
- "Malin Kundang – Kredit Lengkap" [Malin Kundang – Full Credits]. filmindonesia.or.id (in Indonesian). Konfiden Foundation. Archived from the original on 2 February 2014.
- "Varia–Djakartawood". Film Varia (in Indonesian). 1 (4). Jakarta: 22–23. March 1954a.
- "Varia–Djakartawood". Film Varia (in Indonesian). 1 (6). Jakarta: 16–17. May 1954b.
- Yayasan Untuk Indonesia, ed. (2005). "Netty Herawaty". Ensiklopedi Jakarta (in Indonesian). Vol. 2. Jakarta: Department of Culture and Museums, Provincial Government of the Jakarta Capital Region. pp. 353–352. ISBN 978-979-8682-51-3.
