= Netty Herawaty =

Indonesian actress

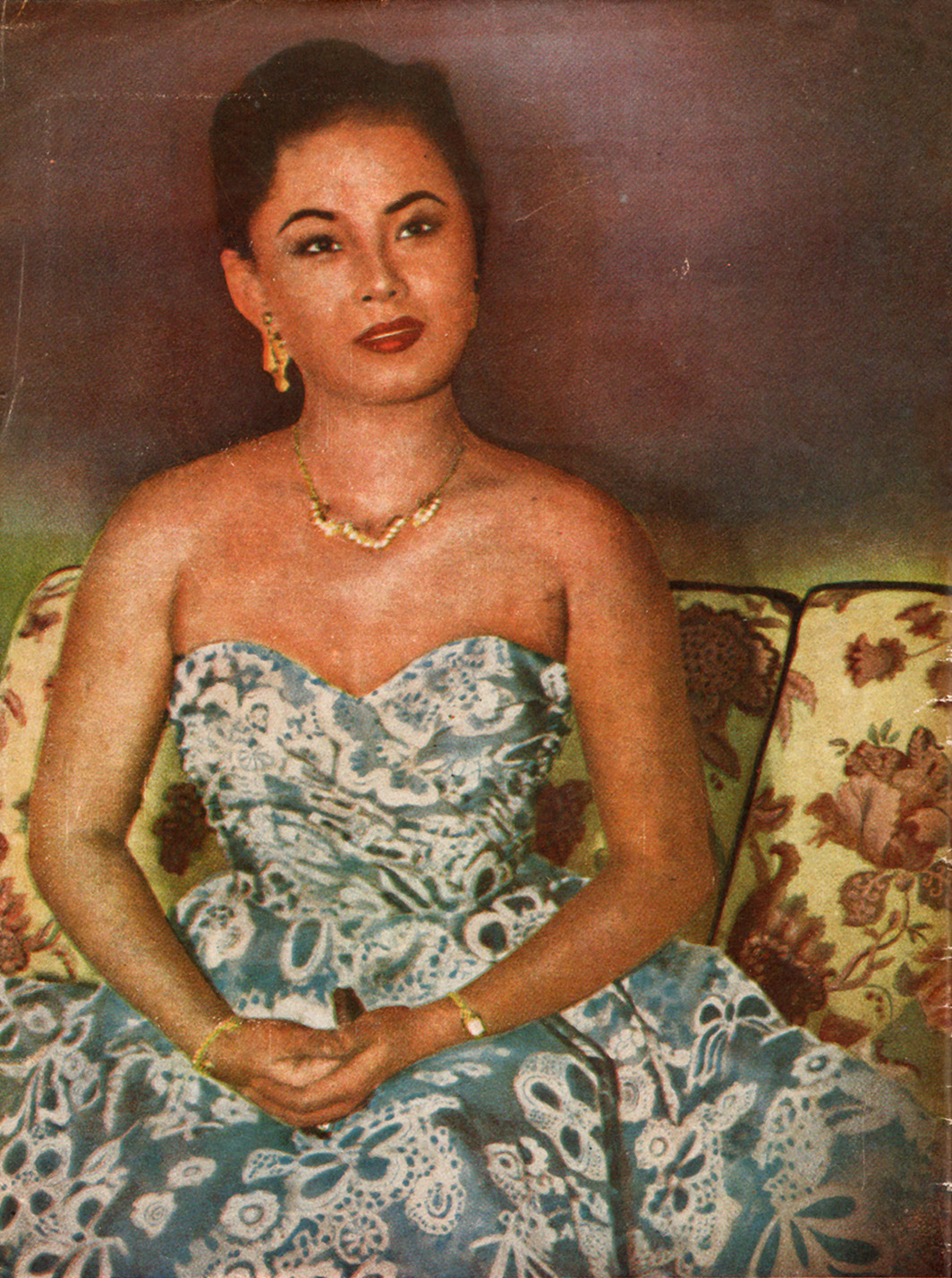
- Netty Herawaty, 1955
- Born: 4 April 1930; Surabaya, Dutch East Indies
- Died: 6 February 1989 (aged 58); Jakarta, Indonesia
- Occupation: Actress
- Years active: 1943–1986
- Height: 5 ft 4 in (163 cm)
- Spouse: Darussalam
- Children: 3
- Mother: Miss Riboet Muda

Netty Herawaty (4 April 1930 – 6 February 1989) was an Indonesian actress who made more than fifty films between 1949 and 1986. She was the part of Classical Indonesian Cinema.

Born in Surabaya, as a teenager Herawaty toured Java with a number of stage troupes during the Japanese occupation and Indonesian National Revolution. In 1949, she made her feature film debut in Fred Young's Saputangan. After two years of collaborating with Young, appearing in a total of eight films for his Bintang Surabaja Film Corporation, Herawaty migrated to Djamaluddin Malik's Persari, where she soon became one of the company's most popular stars and appeared in such films as Rodrigo de Villa (1952) and Lewat Djam Malam (1955). When Persari was shut down, Herawaty returned to the theatre, spending most of the 1960s away from Indonesia's struggling film industry. She returned to screen in the 1970s, appearing in supporting roles in more than thirty films before her death.

== Early life ==
Herawaty was born on 4 April 1930 in Surabaya, East Java, Dutch East Indies, as the daughter of Soepingi, a violinist, and Miss Riboet Muda, an actress. She graduated from the R.K. Zuster School before becoming active on stage at age thirteen, when she joined Irama Masa, a theatrical company established by the Japanese occupation government. Later in 1943, she married Darussalam, a fellow actor with the company who was ten years her senior. According to an interview with Kentjana, the couple fell in love while their troupe was on a boat returning from Makassar. By 1953 they had one child, a daughter named Rustiany.

In 1945, following the surrender of Japan and the proclamation of Indonesian independence, Herawaty and her husband established the troupe Trimurti, based out of Gombong, Central Java. They toured Java and supported the Indonesians fighting against the returning Dutch colonial forces. This troupe had collapsed by 1947, and the two spent time with Djamaluddin Malik's troupe Bintang Timur and Fred Young's Bintang Surabaja. She then established Panggung Bhakti Artis along with Mimi Mariani.

== Bintang Surabaja and Persari ==
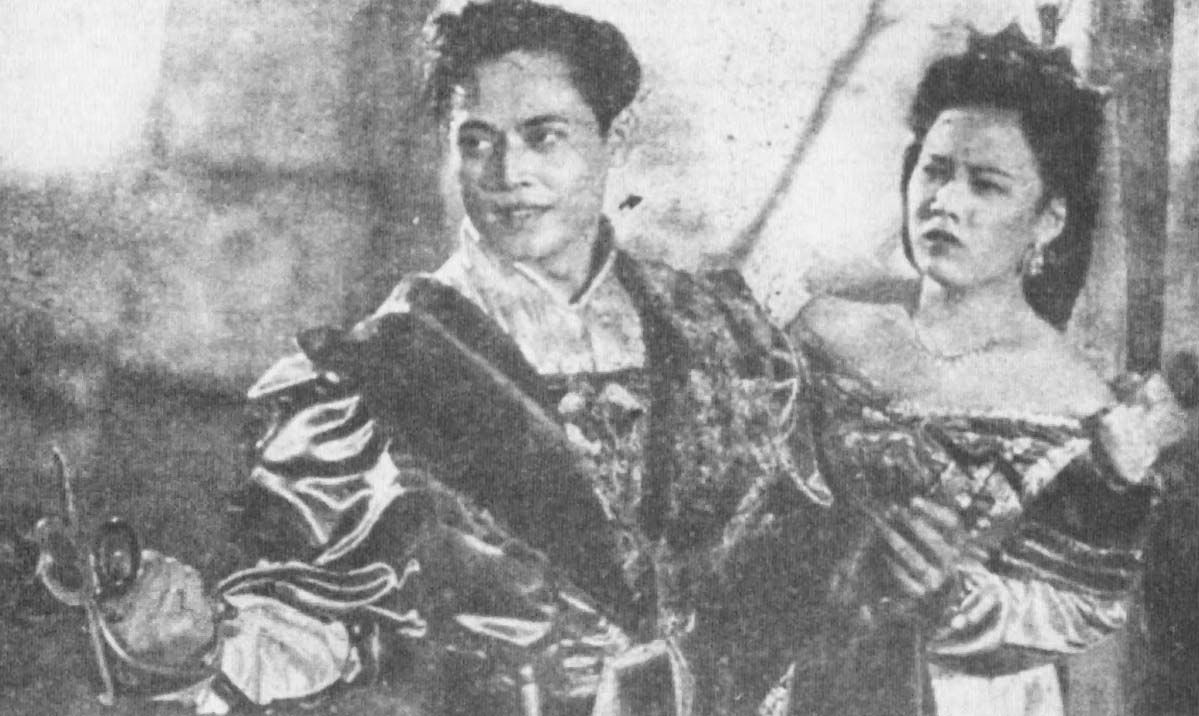
Rd Mochtar and Herawaty in Rodrigo de Villa (1952)

When Young established his own film company in 1949, also called Bintang Surabaja, Herawaty made the transition to film. Her first role was in Saputangan. This was followed by seven further films for the company, including Bintang Surabaja 1951 (1950), Djembatan Merah (1950), and Selamat Berdjuang, Masku! (1951). Herawaty's greatest success during the 1950s, however, was with Djamaluddin Malik's Persari. She joined the company shortly after it was established, appearing in early productions such as Sepandjang Malioboro (1951) and Surjani Mulia (1951), and was often cast along with Rd Mochtar.

In 1952 Herawaty was part of a group of Persari actors and crew members who spent nearly two years in the Philippines to study filmmaking and produce two Ansco Colour films in collaboration with LVN Studio. In the first of these productions, the Indonesian-language edition of Rodrigo de Villa (1952), she was cast in the role of Jimena, the daughter of a treasonous courtier who falls in love with a loyal royalist. The second production, Leilani (also Tabu, 1953) saw Herawaty take the title role as a newlywed separated from her groom by a storm.

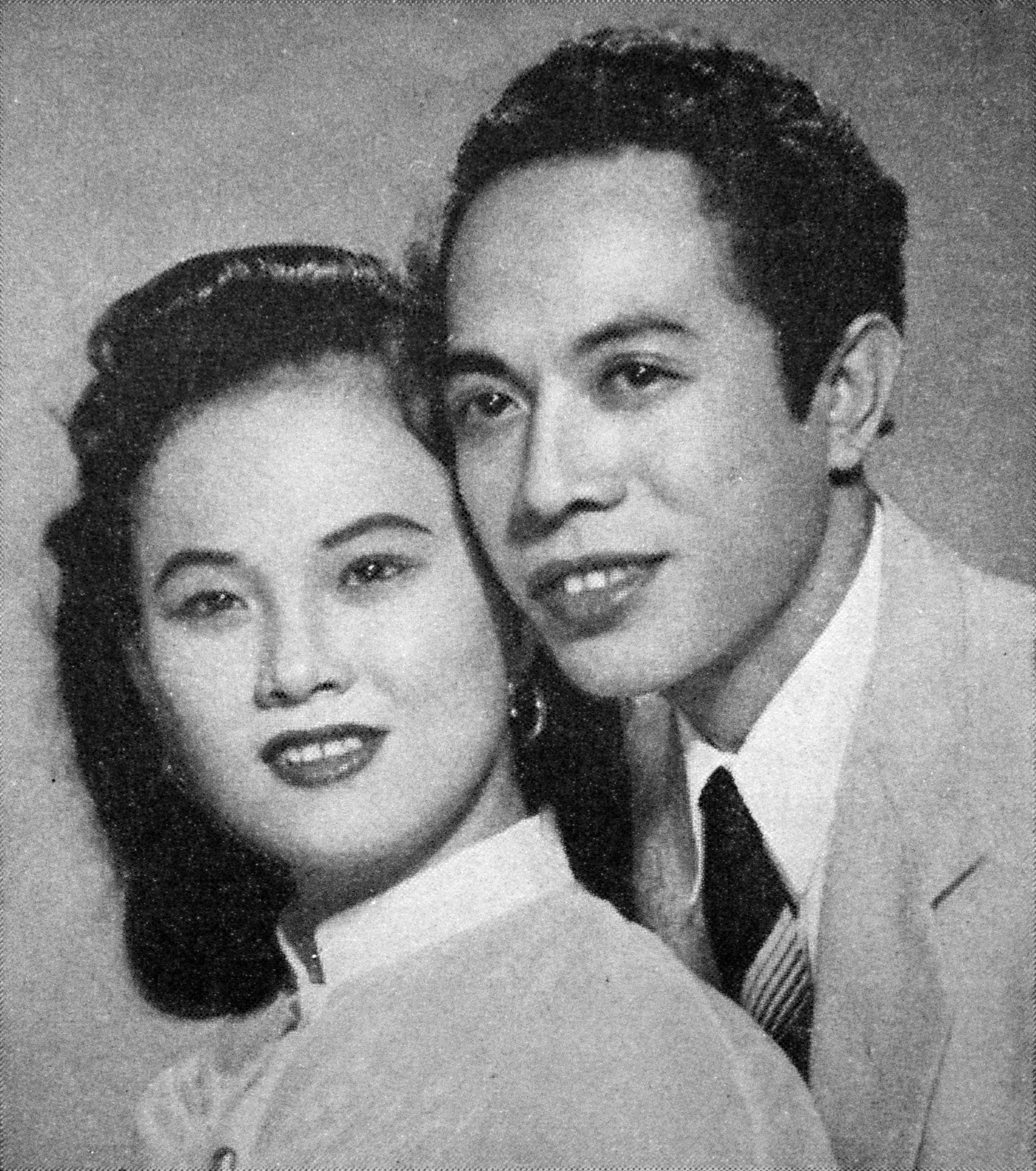
Herawaty and her husband Darussalam, 1954

Upon returning to Indonesia in 1953, Herawaty continued acting for Persari, appearing in a further seven films for the company. This included the role of Norma, the fiancée of a returned guerrilla, in the Perfini–Persari collaboration Lewat Djam Malam, which won a Citra Award for Best Film at the 1955 Indonesian Film Festival. By 1954 Herawaty was considered part of the Persari's "Big Four", together with Darussalam, fellow actress Titien Sumarni, and Mochtar. The following year she was named most popular Indonesian actress by the magazine Film Varia, though the film critic Salim Said suggests Malik influenced this decision; Sumarni, who had had a falling out with Persari, had won the popular vote.

== Later life and career ==
In 1957, Malik was accused of corruption and placed under house arrest. The following year Persari was closed and much of its staff dispersed. Herawaty, rather than stay in the struggling film industry, returned to the theatre. With Darussalam, she established the Herawaty National Theatre in 1958, but over the next decade she acted with several troupes. Herawaty made only one film in the 1960s, Nenny (1968).

In the 1970s Herawaty made another return to cinema, albeit mostly in supporting roles. She featured in more than thirty films between Djembatan Emas (1971) and Bintang Kejora (1986), including several films starring the dangdut singer Rhoma Irama. She and Darussalam were also active on television, with their show Senyum Jakarta (1972–1980); their fellow actors included Fifi Young and Tan Tjeng Bok.

In 1978 Herawaty received an award from the governor of Jakarta for her contributions to film, and in 1981 the Indonesian Film Actors Union (Persatuan Artis Film Indonesia, or PARFI) congress recognized her as their "Exemplary Actress". On 6 February 1989 at 17:00 WIB, Herawaty was rushed to Cikini Hospital in Cikini, Menteng, due to cardiovascular disease and diabetes. According to her youngest daughter, Erlina (born 1960), Herawaty did not complain of anything but felt difficulty defecating in the morning which then caused her physical condition to decline and she experienced shortness of breath. She died there three hours later at the age of 58.

== Filmography ==
In her forty-three-year acting career, Herawaty appeared in some fifty-five films.

- Saputangan (1949)
- Bintang Surabaja 1951 (1950)
- Damarwulan (1950)
- Djembatan Merah (1950)
- Harumanis (1950)
- Ratapan Ibu (1950)
- Bakti Bahagia (1951)
- Hidup Baru (1951)
- Ditepi Bengawan Solo (1951)
- Main-Main Djadi Sungguhan (1951)
- Sepandjang Malioboro (1951)
- Surjani Mulia (1951)
- Pahlawan (1951)
- Selamat Berdjuang, Masku! (1951)
- Rodrigo de Villa (1952)
- Asam Digunung Garam Dilaut (1953)
- Gara-gara Hadiah (1953)
- Kenari (1953)
- Leilani (Tabu) (1953)
- Air Pasang (1954)
- Lewat Djam Malam (1954)
- Tjalon Duta (1955)
- Karlina Marlina (1957)
- Nenny (1968)
- Djembatan Emas (The Golden Bridge) (1971)
- Mawar Rimba (1972)
- Ratu Ular (1972)
- Si Rano (1973)
- Drakula Mantu (Benyamin Kontra Drakula) (1974)
- Cinta Remaja (1974)
- Kasih Sayang (1974)
- Wulan di Sarang Penculik (1975)
- Kenapa Kau Pergi (1975)
- Surat Undangan (1975)
- Boss Bagio dalam Gembong Ibukota (1976)
- Oma Irama Penasaran (1976)
- Naga Merah (1976)
- One Way Ticket (Semoga Kau Kembali) (1976)
- Wajah Tiga Perempuan (1976)
- Badai Pasti Berlalu (1977)
- Marina (1977)
- Cinta Bersemi (1977)
- Tinggal Bersama (1977)
- Santara Menumpas Perdagangan Sex (1977)
- Rahasia Seorang Ibu (1977)
- Gitar Tua Oma Irama (1977)
- Gara-gara Isteri Muda (1977)
- Cinta Putih (Bidan Aminah) (1977)
- Raja Dangdut (1978)
- Istri Dulu Istri Sekarang (1978)
- Aduh Aduh Mana Tahan (1980)
- Bodoh-bodoh Mujur (1981)
- Hati yang Perawan (1984)
- Gadis Hitam Putih (1985)
- Bintang Kejora (1986)

== Works cited ==
- Apa Siapa Orang Film Indonesia [What and Who: Film Figures in Indonesia] (in Indonesian). Jakarta: Indonesian Ministry of Information. 1999. OCLC 44427179.
- Biran, Misbach Yusa, ed. (1979). Apa Siapa Orang Film Indonesia 1926–1978 [What and Who: Film Figures in Indonesia, 1926–1978]. Jakarta: Sinematek Indonesia. OCLC 6655859.
- Biran, Misbach Yusa (2009). Peran Pemuda dalam Kebangkitan Film Indonesia [The Role of the Youth in the Development of the Indonesian Film Industry] (in Indonesian). Jakarta: Ministry of Youth and Sports. OCLC 607257806.
- Kristanto, JB, ed. (2007). Katalog Film Indonesia 1926– 2007. Jakarta: Nalar. ISBN 978-979-26-9006-4.
- "Netty Herawati – Filmografi" [Netty Herawati – Filmography]. filmindonesia.or.id (in Indonesian). Jakarta: Konfiden Foundation. Archived from the original on 10 August 2016.
- "Netty Herawaty, Kehidupannja Sehari-Hari" [Netty Herawaty, Her Day-to-Day Life]. Kentjana (in Indonesian). 1 (1). Jakarta: 4–5. August 1953.
- "Penghargaan Lewat Djam Malam" [Awards for Lewat Djam Malam]. filmindonesia.or.id (in Indonesian). Jakarta: Konfiden Foundation. Archived from the original on 18 July 2014.
- "Rempo Urip". Dunia Film (in Indonesian). 3 (16). Jakarta: 8. 1 April 1954.
- Said, Salim (1982). Profil Dunia Film Indonesia [Profile of Indonesian Cinema] (in Indonesian). Jakarta: Grafiti Pers. OCLC 9507803.
- "Varia–Djakartawood". Film Varia (in Indonesian). 1 (4). Jakarta: 22–23. March 1954.
- Yayasan Untuk Indonesia, ed. (2005). "Netty Herawaty". Ensiklopedi Jakarta (in Indonesian). Vol. 2. Jakarta: Department of Culture and Museums, Provincial Government of the Jakarta Capital Region. pp. 353–352. ISBN 978-979-8682-51-3.
