= Rodrigo de Villa =

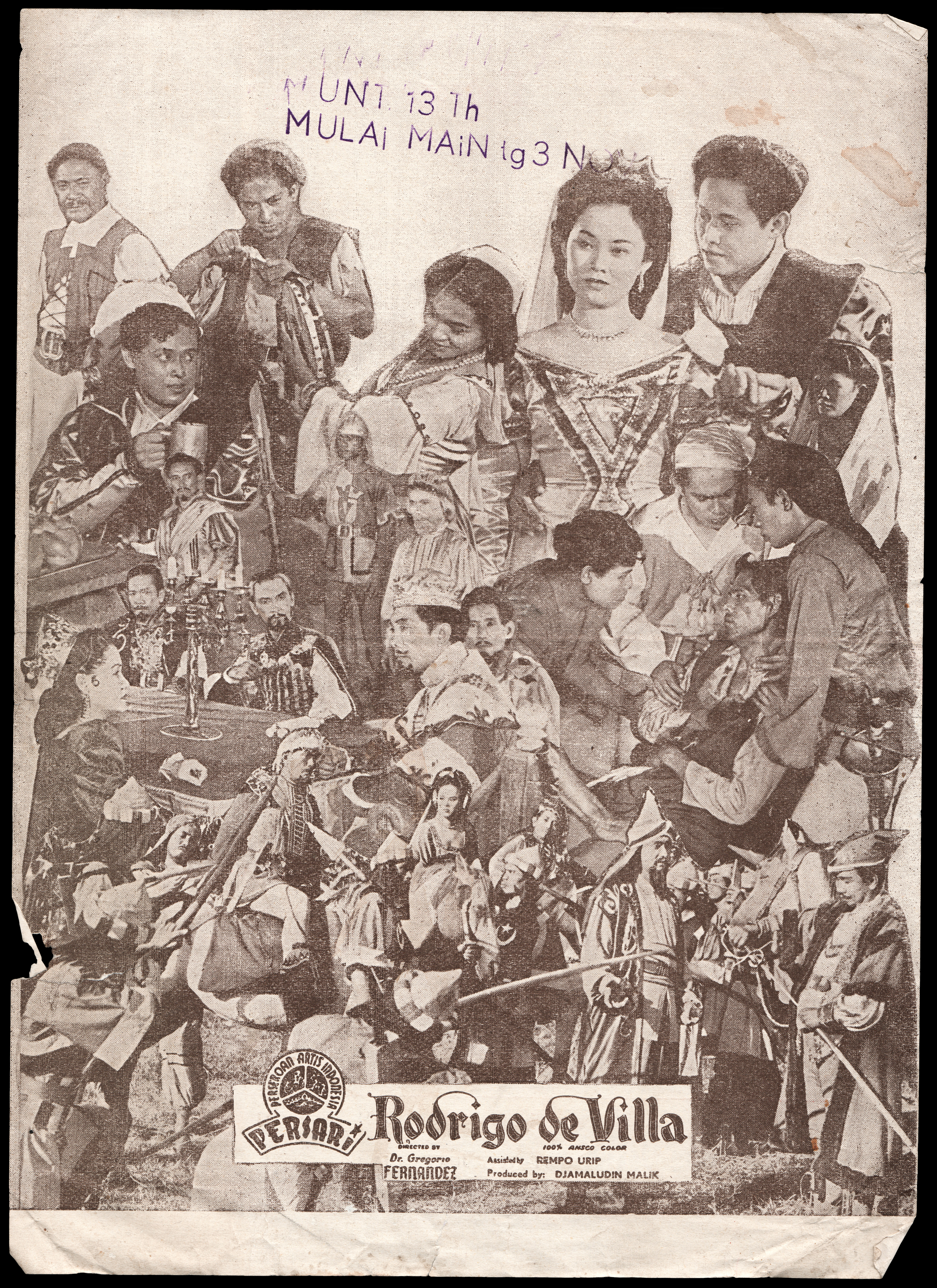
- Advertorial flyer, Indonesian version
- Directed by: Rempo Urip; Gregorio Fernandez
- Written by: Nemesio Caravana
- Produced by: Djamaluddin Malik
- Starring: Mario Montenegro; Delia Razon; Rd Mochtar; Netty Herawaty
- Production companies: Persari; LVN Studio
- Distributed by: 20th Century Fox
- Release date: November 3, 1952 (Indonesia)
- Countries: Indonesia; Philippines
- Languages: Bahasa Indonesia; Filipino

Rodrigo de Villa is an Indonesian-Philippine historical drama film released in 1952. It was co-produced by Philippine-based LVN Studio and Indonesia-based Persari.

The film is the first international co-production done by a Filipino film studio with a studio outside the Philippines. Done in Ansco Color, the Rodrigo de Villa is the first Indonesian film production in color.

Two versions of the film were made with each version having a different casting. The Philippine version was directed by Gregorio Fernandez while the Indonesian version was directed by Rempo Urip.

== Cast ==
- Rd Mochtar (ID) / Mario Montenegro (PH) as Rodrigo de Villa
- Netty Herawaty (ID) / Delia Razon (PH) as Jimena
- Rendra Karno as Don Juan
- Darussalam as Don Pedro
- Soekarsih as Queen Isabella
- Nana Mayo as Selima
- Astaman as King Alfonso
- Awaludin as King Lozano
- Djuriah Karno
- A. Hadi as King Leynes
- R.H. Andjar Subyanto as Duke Montero
- Pete Elfonso
- Dhira Soehoed
- Mimi Mariani

== Synopsis ==
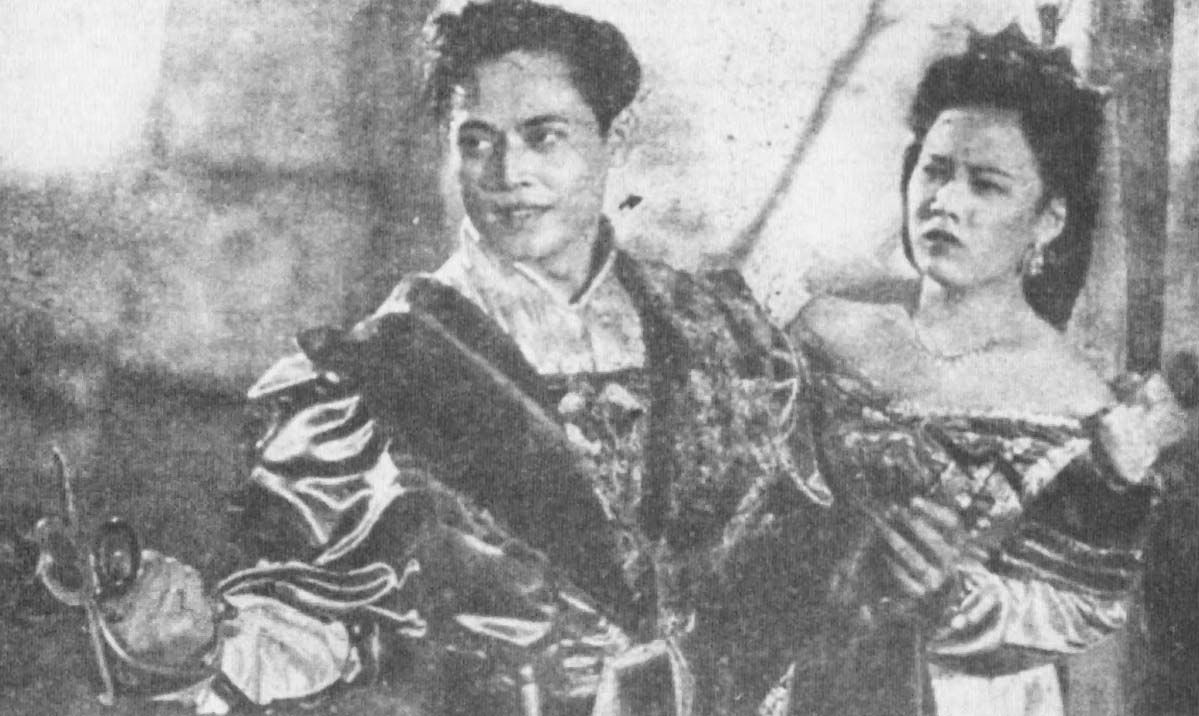
Rd Mochtar and Netty Herawaty as the titular character and Jemina respectively in the Indonesian version of Rodrigo de Villa.

In Castile, Queen Isabella and Lozano, a nobleman, collaborates with the invading Ottoman forces to take over the palace which leads to the arrest of King Alfonso and his men including Rodrigo de Villa, the son of Leynes, another nobleman. Lozano is appointed by the Ottomans as king as a reward for the collaboration and marries Isabella.

Jimena, Lozano's daughter is in a relationship with de Villa. King Lozano's second man falls in love with Jimena but the latter remain loyal to de Villa. Selima, the daughter of the Ottoman ruler, releases the former King Alfonso and de Villa due to a conflict with her father. De Villa, along with his stepbrothers Don Juan and Don Pedro, mobilize a force to expel the Ottomans from Castille. They defeat the Ottomans and remove Lozano from the throne.
