= Rempo Urip =

Indonesian film director

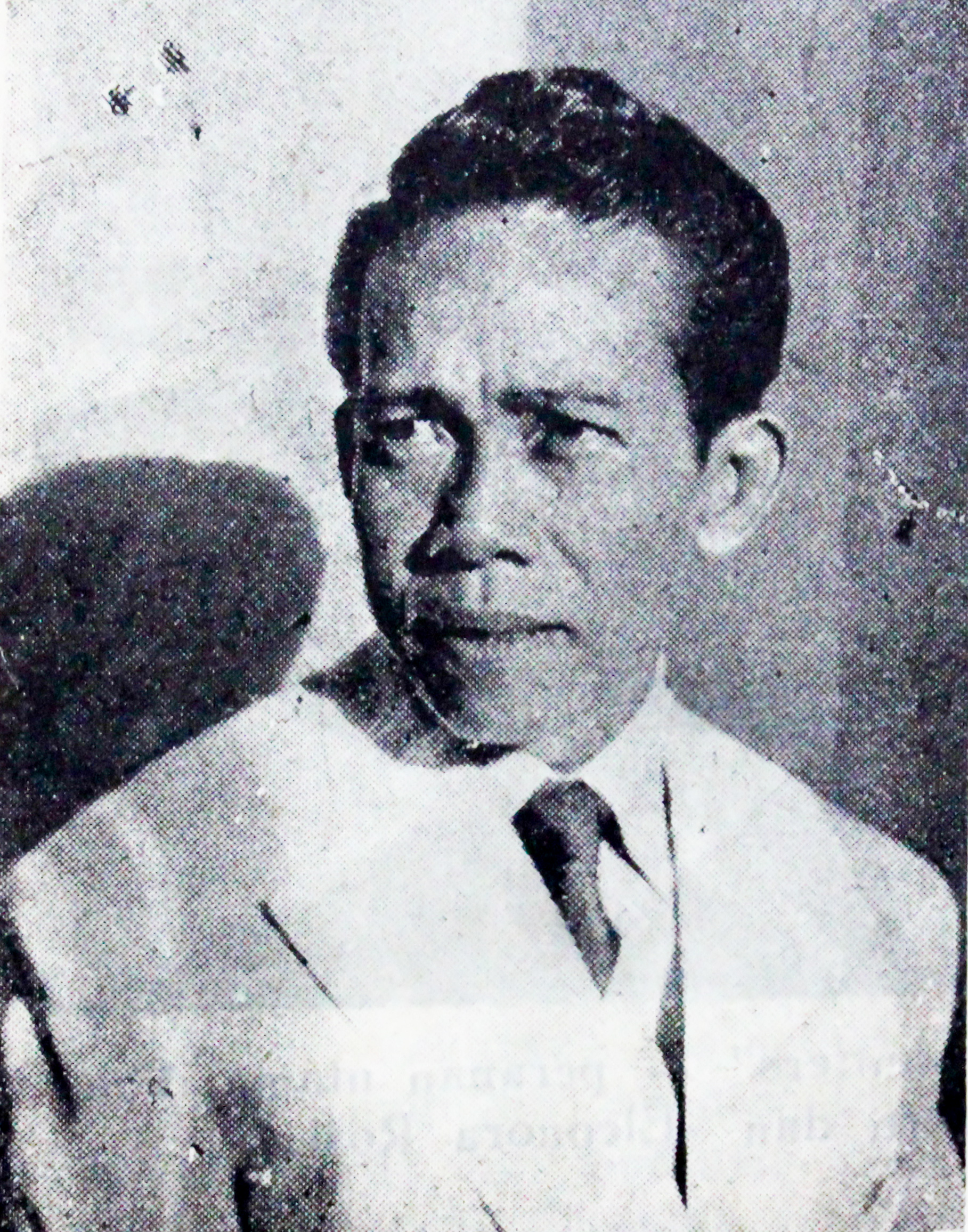
- Rempo Urip, c. 1954
- Born: 10 July 1914; Purworejo, Dutch East Indies (now Indonesia)
- Died: 15 January 2001 (aged 86); Jakarta, Indonesia
- Occupation: Director
- Years active: 1940–1977

Rempo Urip (10 July 1914 – 15 January 2001) was an Indonesian film director. He began his career in the theatre, serving as an extra and footballer for the Dardanella theatre company beginning in 1934. After six years and three troupes, Urip entered the film industry, working as a distributor for Oriental Film and assistant director for Java Industrial Film. He returned to the theatre during the Japanese occupation (1942–1945) and national revolution (1945–1949). In 1951 he joined Djamaluddin Malik's Persari as a director, completing thirteen films for the company before it closed in 1958. He continued as a freelance director until 1977.

== Biography ==
Urip was born in Purworejo, Central Java, Dutch East Indies, on 10 July 1914. His father was a soldier of common birth. He moved to Palembang in southern Sumatra with his family as a child and attended an English Methodist school. He also took courses in Dutch.

As he was a talented football player, in 1934 he was asked to join the Dardanella theatre company as a footballer during their tour of southeast and south Asia. Every time the troupe arrived in a new city, he and the Dardanella side would play an exhibition game to draw potential audiences. When not playing football, Urip would help with poster design, or take on roles as an extra. In 1936, while producing a film adaptation of Andjar Asmara's play Dr Samsi in India, the company dissolved. After Dardanella's dissolution, Urip made his way back to the Indies and joined Asmara's new troupe Bolero, with whom he stayed until 1937, when he migrated to Fifi Young's Pagoda, under Njoo Cheong Seng. He stayed with this latter company until 1939.

In 1940 Urip joined The Teng Chun's Java Industrial Film (JIF). He served as assistant director to Asmara for Kartinah (1940), before migrating to Oriental Film to work as a distributor. When the latter company closed in mid-1941, Urip returned to JIF and served as assistant director to Asmara on Noesa Penida and Ratna Moetoe Manikam. His film work ceased with the Japanese occupation of the Dutch East Indies in March 1942, which closed all film studios in the Indies. During the occupation (1942–45) and ensuing national revolution (1945–49), Urip returned to theatre, first with Fred Young's Bintang Soerabaia and later with Djamaluddin Malik's Bintang Timoer.

After the conclusion of the revolution, the film industry of the newly independent Indonesia grew considerably. Urip served as assistant director under Fred Young for three films released by the latter's Bintang Surabaja Film Company—Djembatan Merah, Harumanis, and Bintang Surabaja 1951—before migrating to Malik's newly established Persari in 1951. He made his feature film debut as a director with Rindu (1951) before being sent to Manila for a film editing and directing course. During his two years in the Philippines, Urip directed two films for Persari: Rodrigo de Villa (1952) and Leilani (1953). Both were in Ansco Colour, though processed in the Philippines as Indonesia lacked the necessary equipment.

Urip returned to Indonesia in 1953 and continued to work for Persari, first as general manager and later as a director, until the company closed in 1958. He directed ten films in this period, from Bintang Baru (1954) to Karlina Marlina (1957). Afterwards he became a freelance director and, as the film industry imploded, returned to theatre with the Gema Mas Troupe after completing Asmara dan Wanita (1961). He only returned to cinema in 1971, with Pendekar Sumur Tudjuh. Over the next six years he directed another four films, ending his directorial career with Cobra in 1977.

In 1989 Urip was recognized by the National Film Council for his contributions to the industry.

He died in Jakarta in January 2001 at the age of 86.

== Filmography ==
During his nearly forty-year career, Urip worked on almost thirty films.

- Rindu (1951)
- Rodrigo de Villa (1952)
- Asam Digunung Garam Dilaut (1953)
- Leilani (1953)
- Bintang Baru (1954)
- Air Pasang (1954)
- Pegawai Tinggi (1954)
- Siapa Ajahku (1954)
- Supir Istimewa (1954)
- Tjalon Duta (1955)
- Hadiah 10.000 (1955)
- Harta Angker (1956)
- Karlina Marlina (1957)
- Sendja Indah (1957)
- Ibu Mertua (1960)
- Satu Budjang Lima Dara (1960)
- Menudju Bintang (1960)
- Asmara dan Wanita (1961)
- Pendekar Sumur Tudjuh (1971)
- Diantara Anggrek Berbunga (1972)
- Aku Mau Hidup (1974)
- Bunga Roos dari Cikembang (1975)
- Cobra (1977)
