= A. N. Alcaff =

Indonesian actor and film director (1925–1987)

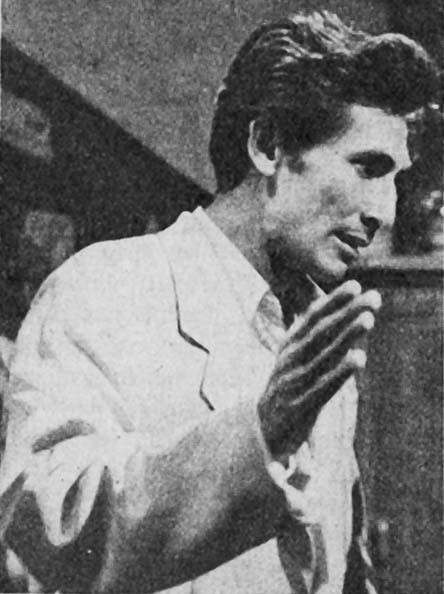
- Alcaff in 1955
- Born: Achmad Nungcik Alcaff or Achmad Nirwana Alcaff; 17 August 1925; Jambi, Jambi, Dutch East Indies
- Died: 22 December 1987 (aged 62)
- Burial place: Karet Bivak Cemetery
- Occupations: Actor; film director
- Years active: 1943–1984
- Children: 11
- Awards: Citra Award for Best Actor (1955)

Achmad Nungcik Alcaff (17 August 1925 – 22 December 1987), also known as Achmad Nirwana Alcaff, was an Indonesian actor and film director. He is best known internationally for his portrayal of Iskandar, a brave and idealistic guerrilla leader, in Usmar Ismail's Lewat Djam Malam (1954), a role that earned him the Citra Award for Best Actor and made him the first recipient of that award. His sole directorial credit was Intan Perawan Kubu (1972), which starred Yati Octavia and was produced in partnership with the Jambi Regional Government.

== Early life and education ==
Achmad Nungcik Alcaff, also known as Achmad Nirwana Alcaff, was born on 17 August 1925 in Jambi, Jambi. He was educated at the Neutrale Schakel School from 1931 to 1938 and also took courses in English and writing. From childhood, Alcaff showed a strong interest in acting.

== Career ==
During the Japanese occupation of the Dutch East Indies in 1943, Alcaff worked as an employee for Nippon Kabusiki Tannin Khaisa. From 1946 to 1950, he served in the Army Military Police Corps as an assistant lieutenant and sergeant major in the Garuda division led by Alamsyah Ratu Perwiranegara. He subsequently became active in stage acting and co-founded the Tjendrawasih troupe, an amateur stage company, with Kamal Chatab. Among his mentors were senior artists including Rendra Karno, Dhalia, and Astaman.

In 1950 or 1951, Alcaff made his film debut in Dosa Tak Berampun (1951), directed by Usmar Ismail and produced by Perfini. The film, adapted from the play Ayahku Pulang, follows a young man driven into a life of crime by poverty; Alcaff played the leading role of Hasan alongside Rd Ismail, Laksmi, and Awaluddin Djamin. He went on to appear in numerous films, including Embun (1951), Sangkar Mas (1952), Asmara Murni (1953), and Lewat Djam Malam (1954). In the latter, a film about a former independence soldier caught up in armed conflict with the Dutch, Alcaff played the brave and idealistic guerrilla leader Iskandar — his breakthrough performance, which earned him the Citra Award for Best Actor at the 1955 Indonesian Film Festival and made him the first recipient of that honour. By 1965 he had starred in 24 black-and-white films in leading roles. Further credits from this period include Mendung Sendja Hari (1960), Santy (1961), Bintang Ketjil (1963), and Apa Jang Kau Tangisi (1965). From 1970 to 1971, he also appeared in supporting roles in Dan Bunga-Bunga Berguguran (1970) and Brandal-Brandal Metropolitan (1971).

In 1972, Alcaff made his directorial debut with Intan Kubu Perawan (1972), a film about a girl living in the forest who falls in love with a prince. It starred Yati Octavia in the leading role and was produced by PT Indah Geeta Film and the Jambi Regional Government. He continued to take supporting roles in subsequent years, appearing in Ratapan Si Miskin (1974), Pembalasan Si Pitung (1977), Ratu Pantai Selatan (1980), and Sunan Kalijaga (1983). Alcaff retired from acting in 1984 and remained so until his death in December 1987.

== Personal life ==
As of 1979, Alcaff resided at Otto Iskandardinata No. 103 B Street in East Jakarta. He had 11 children. He was known for his extraordinary versatility across film genres, and was regarded by those who knew him as simple, humble, friendly, polite, humorous, and community-minded.

== Filmography ==
- Dosa Tak Berampun (1951)
- Embun (1952)
- Sorga Terakhir (1952)
- Chandra Dewi (1952)
- Sangkar Emas (1952)
- Penjelundup (1952)
- Asmara Murni (1953)
- Lagu Kenangan (1953)
- Ajah Kikir (1953)
- Kenari (1953)
- Air Pasang (1954)
- Lewat Djam Malam (1954)
- Mendung Sendja Hari (1960)
- Desa Yang Dilupakan (1960)
- Istana Yang Hilang (1960)
- Santy (1961)
- Malam Tak Berembun (1961)
- Korban Fitnah (1961)
- Bintang Ketjil (1963)
- Membina Dunia Baru (1964)
- Apa Jang Kautangisi (1965)
- Dan Bunga-Bunga Berguguran (1970)
- Hidup, Tjinta Dan Air Mata (1970)
- Air Mata Kekasih (1971)
- Ratna (1971)
- Tiada Maaf Bagimu (1971)
- Brandal-Brandal Metropolitan (1971)
- Di antara Anggrek Berbunga (1972)
- Intan Perawan Kubu (1972)
- Percintaan (1973)
- Pengorbanan (1974)
- Pembalasan Si Pitung (1977)
- Krakatau (1977)
- Duo Kribo (1977)
- Kuda-Kuda Binal (1978)
- Kasus (1978)
- Karena Dia (1979)
- Ratu Pantai Selatan (1980)
- Khana (1980)
- Dukun Lintah (1981)
- Perawan-Perawan (1981)
- Bukan Impian Semusim (1981)
- Bayi Ajaib (1982)
- Sunan Kalijaga (1983)
- Anak-Anak Tak Beribu (1991)

== Awards and nominations ==
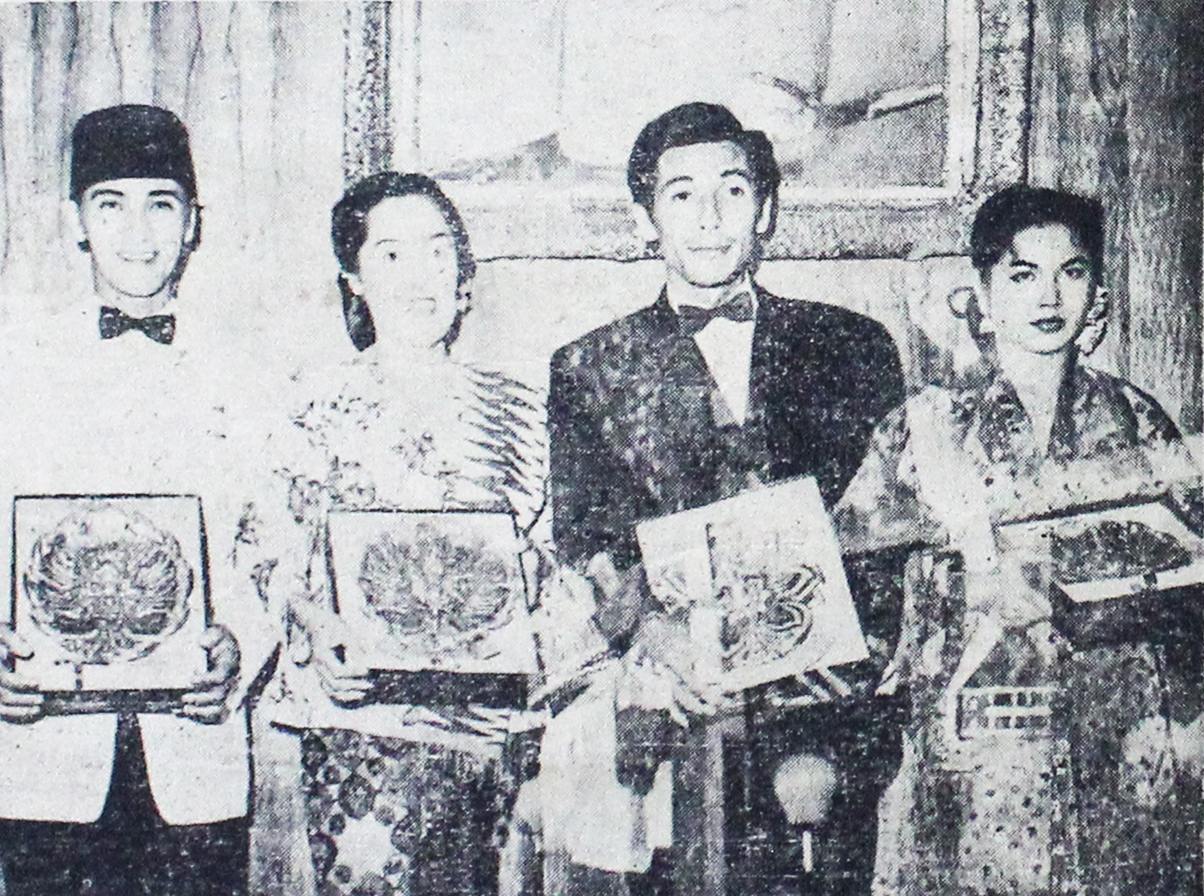
A. Hadi, Fifi Young, Alcaff, and Dhalia at the 1955 Indonesian Film Festival

Year	Award	Category	Title	Result	Ref
1955	Indonesian Film Festival	Best Actor	Lewat Djam Malam	Won	

== Death and legacy ==
Alcaff died on 22 December 1987 from complications of kidney disease, high blood pressure, and heart disease at the age of 62. He was buried at Karet Bivak Cemetery.
