= Lilik Sudjio =

Indonesian director and actor (1930–2014)

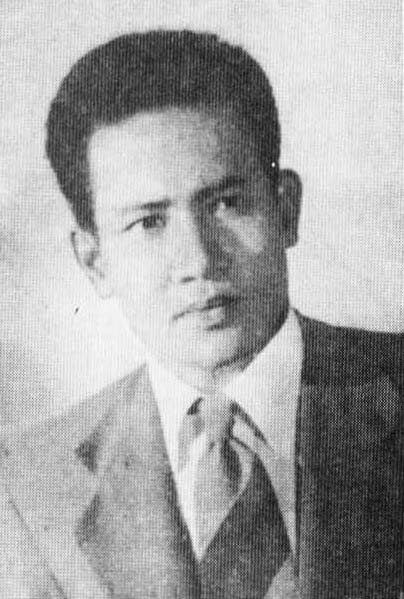
- Sudjio, c. 1955
- Born: 14 May 1930; Makassar, Dutch East Indies
- Died: 9 December 2014 (aged 84); Jakarta, Indonesia
- Awards: 2 Citra Awards

Lilik Sudjio (14 May 1930 – 9 December 2014) was an Indonesian actor turned film director who won the Citra Award for Best Director in 1955 for his film Tarmina. He was involved in 74 feature film productions since his debut in Fred Young's Saputangan in 1949.

== Biography ==
Lilik was born in Makassar, Dutch East Indies, on 14 May 1930 to Astaman and his wife. Taking the pseudonym Astaman Jr., Lilik began his stage career as a teenager during the Indonesian National Revolution, joining the Bintang Timoer troupe with his father under the leadership of Djamaluddin Malik. In 1949 he made his film debut with a small role in Fred Young's Saputangan (Handkerchief). The following year he appeared in four further films, for three different production companies. He had his last on-screen role in 1951's Surjani Mulia, directed by Mohammad Said Hamid Junid and produced by Malik's film company Persari.

Also in 1951 Lilik had his first experience as a member of a film crew, working the clapperboard and writing scripts for the company's production Dunia Gila. After several years of working menial tasks and learning the production side of the industry, Lilik was tasked as director for Tarmina in 1954. For the film, which followed a young woman named Tarmina who married multiple times before committing suicide, Lilik directed his father, as well as Fifi Young, A Hadi, and Djauhari Effendi. The film was recognised as the Best Film at the inaugural Indonesian Film Festival in 1955, and Lilik was recognised as Best Director. However, the decision was controversial: the festival's panel was decried by film critics as having sold out to Malik, as they considered D. Djajakusuma's Lewat Djam Malam (After the Curfew; 1954) to be a much more solid work.

After his success with Tarmina, Lilik directed and, later, produced and edited several dozen films. He took a hiatus between 1960 and 1962 to study cinema at the University of California, Los Angeles. After Persari was closed in the 1960s Lilik went between studios. For his editing of the film Juda Saba Desa (1966) Lilik received Best Editing at the 1967 Indonesian Film Festival. He made his final feature film in 1990 with Misteri dari Gunung Merapi III (Perempuan Berambut Api) (Mystery from Mount Merapi III: The Girl with the Firey Hair). This silat (martial arts) film saw Fendi Pradana as Sembara, a skilled warrior who must save his compatriots from a woman with fire for hair. As the Indonesian film industry saw a downturn in 1992, Lilik began directing sinetron (television shows), including Mahkota Madangkara (Crown of Madangkara; 1992), Si Buta Dari Goa Hantu (The Blind Man from Ghost Cave; 1994) and Cinta Dalam Misteri (Love in Mysteries; 1996).

Lilik died on 9 December 2014.

== Filmography ==
=== Actor ===
- Saputangan (1949)
- Bintang Surabaja 1951 (1950)
- Djembatan Merah (1950)
- Kembang Katjang (1950)
- Remong Batik (1950)
- Surjani Mulia (1951)

=== Crew ===
- Dunia Gila (1951)
- Tarmina (1954)
- Kekasih Ajah (1955)
- Kasih dan Tjinta (1956)
- Anakku Sajang (1957)
- Darah Tinggi (1960)
- Teruna Djenaka (1960)
- Tugas Baru Inspektur Rachman (1960)
- Djakarta By Pass (1962)
- Membina Dunia Baru (1964)
- Penjesalan (1964)
- Suzie (1966)
- Juda Saba Desa (1967)
- Djampang (Ketjil) (1968)
- Djampang Mentjari Naga Hitam (1968)
- Karena Kasih (1969)
- Tuan Tanah Kedawung (1970)
- Awan Djingga (1970)
- Si Bego Menumpas Kutjing Hitam (1970)
- Si Buta dari Gua Hantu (1970)
- Tuan Tanah Kedawung (1970)
- Air Mata Kekasih (Lover's Tears; 1971)
- Perawan Buta (1971)
- Ratu Ular (1972)
- Pahlawan Goa Selarong (1972)
- Si Bongkok (1972)
- Bapak Kawin Lagi (1973)
- Tabah Sampai Akhir (1973)
- Cinta Remaja (1974)
- Tarsan Kota (1974)
- Traktor Benyamin (1975)
- Tarsan Pensiunan (1976)
- Zorro Kemayoran (1976)
- Anak Emas (1976)
- Bandit Pungli (1977)
- Sinyo Adi (1977)
- Wadam (1978)
- Salah Kamar (1978)
- Juwita (1979)
- Tuyul Eee Ketemu Lagi (1979)
- Darna Ajaib (1980)
- Begadang Karena Penasaran (1980)
- Ratu Ilmu Hitam (1981)
- Gundala Putra Petir (1981)
- Manusia Berilmu Gaib (1981)
- Tangkuban Perahu (1982)
- Untung Ada Saya (1982)
- Damarwulan-Minakjinggo (Sebuah Legenda Majapahit) (1983)
- Gepeng Mencari Untung (1983)
- Barang Antik (1983)
- Keris Kalamujeng (1984)
- Cinta Kembar (1984)
- Memburu Makelar Mayat (1986)
- Dendam di Jumat Kliwon (1987)
- Misteri Rumah Tua (1987)
- Empat Brewok dari Goa Sanggreng (1988)
- Ngipri Monyet (1988)
- Tiga Setan Darah dan Cambuk Api Angin (1988)
- Orang-orang Sakti dari Tangkuban Perahu (1988)
- Neraka Lembah Tengkorak (1988)
- Sepasang Iblis Betina (1988)
- Siluman Teluk Gonggo (1988)
- Sengatan Satria Beracun (1988)
- Misteri dari Gunung Merapi (Penghuni Rumah Tua) (1989)
- Si Pahit Lidah dan Si Mata Empat (1989)
- Misteri dari Gunung Merapi II (Titisan Roh Nyai Kembang) (1990)
- Jaka Swara (1990)
- Misteri dari Gunung Merapi III (Perempuan Berambut Api) (1990)

== Works cited ==
- "Filmografi" [Filmography]. Filmindonesia.or.id (in Indonesian). Jakarta: Konfiden Foundation. Archived from the original on 19 July 2014.
- "Lilik Sudjio". Filmindonesia.or.id (in Indonesian). Jakarta: Konfiden Foundation. Archived from the original on 4 April 2016.
- "Lilik Sudjio" (in Indonesian). Taman Ismail Marzuki.
- "Penghargaan Tarmina" [Awards for Tarmina]. filmindonesia.or.id (in Indonesian). Konfiden Foundation. Archived from the original on 27 August 2015.
- "Misteri dari Gunung Merapi III (Perempuan Berambut Api)". Filmindonesia.or.id (in Indonesian). Jakarta: Konfiden Foundation. Archived from the original on 16 July 2014.
- Said, Salim (1982). Profil Dunia Film Indonesia [Profile of Indonesian Cinema] (in Indonesian). Jakarta: Grafiti Pers. OCLC 9507803.
- "Surjani Mulia". Filmindonesia.or.id (in Indonesian). Jakarta: Konfiden Foundation. Archived from the original on 7 March 2016.
- "Tarmina". Filmindonesia.or.id (in Indonesian). Jakarta: Konfiden Foundation. Archived from the original on 7 March 2016.
