= Astaman =

Indonesian actor (1900–1980)

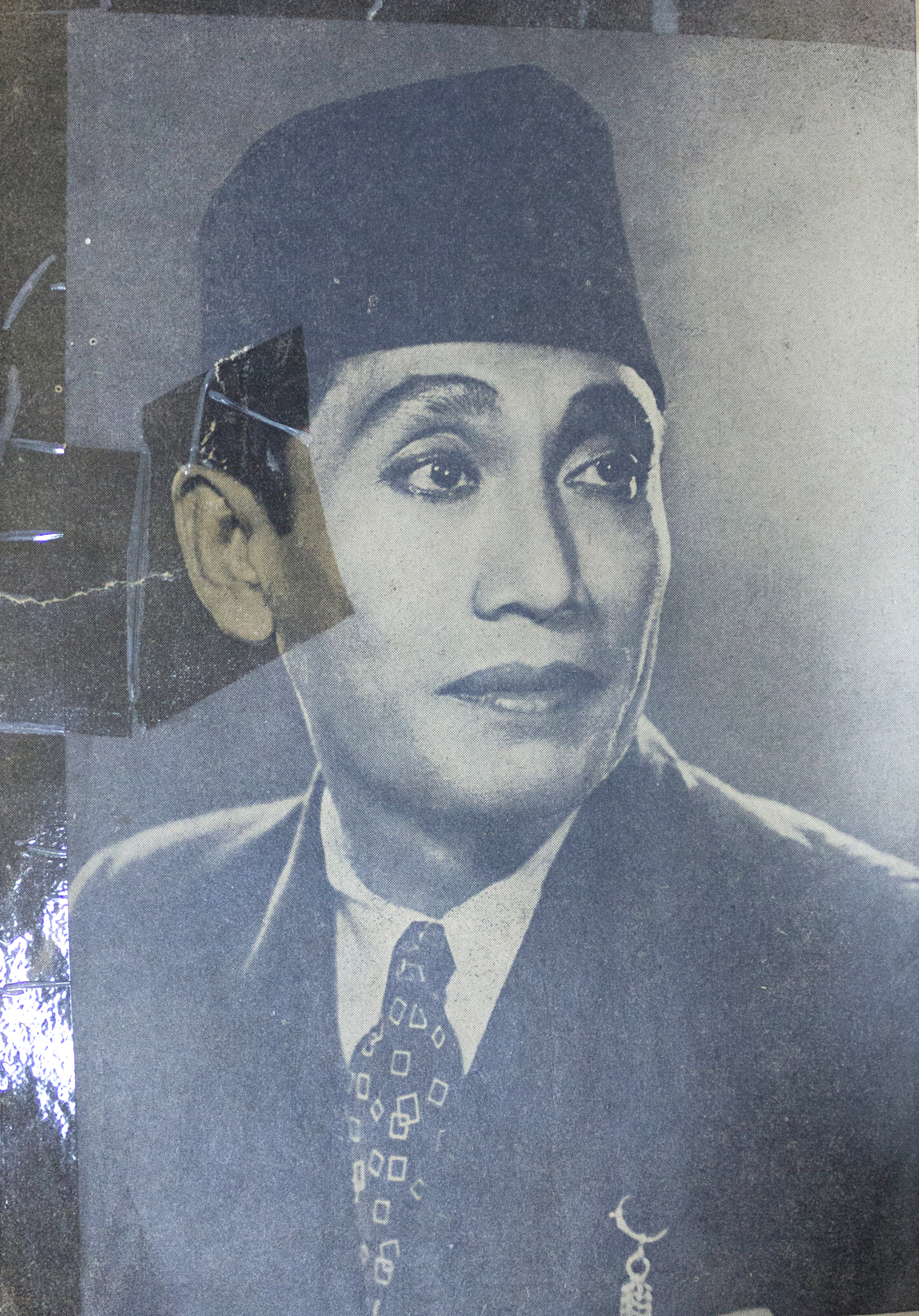
- Astaman in 1941
- Born: 16 May 1900; Sidoarjo, Dutch East Indies
- Died: 20 August 1980 (aged 80); Jakarta, Indonesia
- Occupation: Actor
- Years active: 1910–1974
- Children: 5

Astaman (16 May 1900 – 20 August 1980), also known as Tirtosari, was an Indonesian actor active from the 1910s until the mid-1970s. He was a leading actor in the influential theatre company Dardanella and, after entering the film industry with 1940's Kartinah, acted in 43 films.

== Biography ==
Astaman was born on 16 May 1900 in Sidoarjo, East Java, Dutch East Indies, as the son of an actor, Wagimin, and Sartipah, an actress. He attended elementary school there, only to drop out in his third year. At age ten Astaman joined his father's troupe Wagimin & Keluarga, which consisted of his father, mother, and two cousins. Astaman first sold tickets, later taking up acting and touring rural areas in East Java with the troupe. He left the troupe sometime in 1915, first to join the Theater se Souvenir, then the Constantinople Opera .

By the following year Astaman had abandoned Constantinople to join the troupe Dardanella in 1920, which was run by the Penang-born actor of Russian descent Willy A. Piedro and his native wife Devi Dja. The troupe, which was highly successful and travelled throughout Southeast Asia, helped Astaman rise to prominence. He played various roles with them, and starred in several of their performances, including Andjar Asmara's Dr Samsi and a stage adaptation of Kwee Tek Hoay's Boenga Roos dari Tjikembang. In a 1964 interview with the variety magazine Varia, he recalled that every time he played a king the European viewers would laugh loudly; Astaman later learned that his costume was that of a matador.

Astaman was married and has had five children. His son, Lilik Sudjio, who was born in 1930; later would become a film director. His other sons, Asmadi and Sutaman, was a musician and member of Dari Masa Ke Masa and Telerama orchestra group. In 1936, he joined Dardanella in a trip to India, hoping to produce a film version of Dr Samsi. This plan collapsed, and Dardanella disbanded: Piedro and Dja' went to America, while Andjar and Ali Joego formed their own troupes and returned to the Indies. Astaman returned separately, going to Kediri. After refusing a position with Njoo Cheong Seng's troupe Fifi Young's Pagoda, Astaman joined the group Tuan Mannuk.

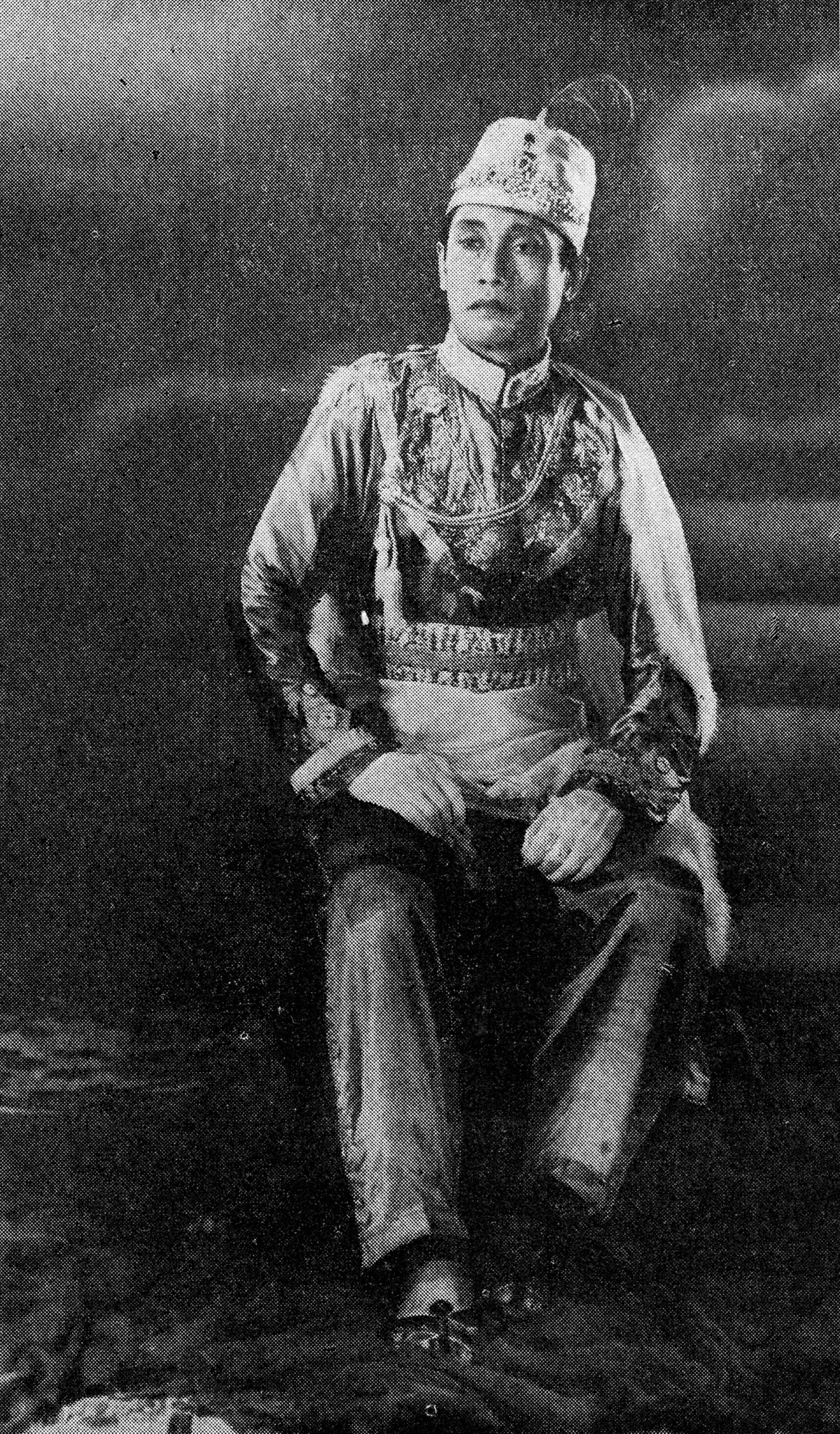
Astaman, in a promotional still for Ratna Moetoe Manikam (1941)

Following the success of Albert Balink's Terang Boelan (Moonlight) in 1937, many theatre actors began migrating to film – including Astaman, who made his feature film debut in 1940. He co-starred along former Dardanella actress Ratna Asmara in Andjar's Kartinah, which saw him take the role of a doctor who falls in love with his nurse despite being married. The following year Astaman acted in three films for The Teng Chun's Java Industrial Film. When the studio closed following the Japanese occupation of the Indies in 1942, Astaman returned to the theatre. During the occupation he acted in a single film, the short propaganda piece Djatoeh Berkait.

In 1949, towards the end of the Indonesian National Revolution, Astaman joined Fred Young's studio Bintang Surabaya and began acting in its films, making his debut with Saputangan in 1949. He was taken by Djamaluddin Malik's Persari in 1951, staying with the company until 1958. Afterwards he focused mainly on the theatre, although he took acting jobs at several different companies until the late 1970s. In his later years he did some television acting.

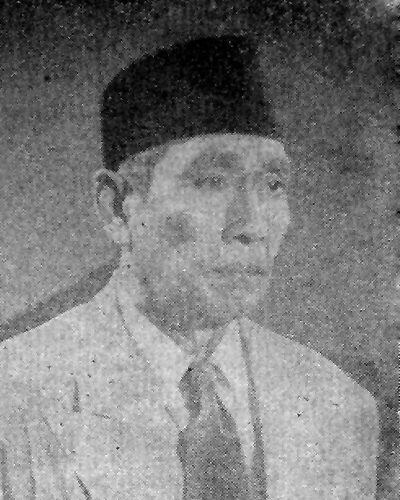
Astaman in 1964

On 20 August 1980, Astaman died at Dr. Mintohardjo Naval Hospital in Tanah Abang, Jakarta, after treated for hypertension which he suffered for 7 years and caused a brain hemorrhage at the age of 80. His body was laid at his son, Asmadi's, house at Perumnas Depok 1 in Depok, West Java, where he spent his final years there.

== Filmography ==
In his seventy-four-year career, Astaman acted in 43 films over a period of 34 years. During this time he wrote the stories to two films.

=== Cast ===
- Kartinah (1940)
- Noesa Penida (1941)
- Elang Darat (Hawk on Land; 1941)
- Ratna Moetoe Manikam (1941)
- Djatoeh Berkait (Fall Together; 1944; short film)
- Saputangan (Handkerchief; 1949)
- Bintang Surabaja 1951 (Star of Surabaya 1951; 1950)
- Damarwulan (1950)
- Djembatan Merah (The Red Bridge; 1950)
- Harumanis (1950)
- Ratapan Ibu (Mother's Wailing; 1950)
- Terang Bulan (Moonlight; 1950)
- Bakti Bahagia (Happy Duty; 1951)
- Djiwa Pemuda (Spirit of the Youth; 1951)
- Pahlawan (Hero; 1951)
- Rumah Hantu (Ghost House; 1951)
- Pengorbanan (Sacrifice; 1952)
- Satria Desa (Village Knight; 1952)
- Rodrigo de Villa (1952)
- Solo Di Waktu Malam (Solo at Night; 1952)
- Ajah Kikir (Father the Miser; 1953)
- Asam Digunung Garam Dilaut (Acid in the Mountains, Salt at Sea; 1953)
- Bagdad (1953)
- Leilani (1953)
- Bintang Baru (New Star; 1954)
- Air Pasang (Rising Tides; 1954)
- Kasih Sajang (Love and Tenderness; 1954)
- Lewat Djam Malam (After the Curfew; 1954)
- Siapa Ajahku (Who is My Father; 1954)
- Tarmina (1954)
- Berdjumpa Kembali (Meet Again; 1955)
- Rindu Damai (Longing for Peace; 1955)
- Buruh Bengkel (Mechanic; 1956)
- Djandjiku (My Promise; 1956)
- Harta Angker (Haunted Treasure; 1956)
- Saodah (1956)
- Ibu Mertua (Mother in Law; 1960)
- Menudju Bintang (Towards the Stars; 1960)
- Asmara dan Wanita (Passion and Women; 1961)
- Melati Dibalik Terali (Jasmine Behind the Trellis; 1961)
- Petir Sepandjang Malam (Thunder Throughout the Night; 1967)
- Lorong Hitam (Black Hole; 1971)
- Putri Solo (Daughter of Solo; 1974)
- Paul Sontoloyo (1974)

=== Crew ===
- Hidup Baru (New Life; 1951)
- Tarmina (1954)
