= Pengantin Pantai Biru =

- Theatrical release poster
- Directed by: Achmad Salim
- Written by: Tim Virgo Film
- Produced by: Ferry Angriawan
- Starring: Meriam Bellina; Sandro Tobing; Abdi Wiyono; Darussalam
- Cinematography: Herman Susilo
- Edited by: Achmad Salim
- Music by: Billy J. Budiardjo
- Distributed by: Virgo Film
- Release date: 1983
- Running time: 96 minutes
- Country: Indonesia
- Language: Indonesian

Pengantin Pantai Biru (literally The Bridegroom of Blue Beach) is a 1983 film directed by Achmad Salim, produced by Ferry Angriawan, and starring Meriam Bellina and Sandro Tobing. It follows two castaways, children who grow up with one of their fathers but must fend for themselves after they are captured and deified by natives. Adapted from Henry De Vere Stacpoole's novel The Blue Lagoon, via the film of the same name, Pengantin Pantai Biru introduces several differences to the story.

== Plot ==
During a storm, the young man Andri (Sandro Tobing) is separated from his grandfather, Prof. Hasnan Rasyid (Abdi Wiyono), and ultimately drifts onto a deserted beach. After wandering he meets Emi (Meriam Bellina) and her father Bram (Darussalam), who take him in.

Years later, when Andri and Emi have grown up, they are captured by a group of islanders, who assume they are gods. The two tease the islanders, whom they find filthy and smelly, but soon learn that they are to provide god-children for the villagers. They try and escape but are followed, ultimately being rescued by Bram, who dies in the attempt.

On their own and hiding from the restless natives, the two begin to fall in love and eventually have a son, whom they name Ami. They are eventually found by the natives, who chase them. When it seems all hope is lost, Andri's grandfather arrives and rescues them.

== Production ==
Pengantin Pantai Biru was directed by Wim Umboh - also known as Achmad Salim - and produced by Ferry Angriawan of Virgo Putra Film. Filming saw Herman Susilo as cinematographer and Nazar Ali as artistic director. Umboh handled editing himself during post-production, while music and sound were provided by Billy J. Budiardjo and Zakaria Rasyid, respectively.

The story for Pengantin Pantai Biru was adapted from Henry De Vere Stacpoole's 1908 novel The Blue Lagoon through the 1980 adaptation, which starred Brooke Shields and Christopher Atkins. The adaptation was completed by a team led by Umboh and Abdi Wiyono. Pengantin Pantai Biru starred Meriam Bellina as Emi (analogous to the novel's Emmeline) and Sandro Tobing as Andri (analogous to Richard), with Abdi Wiyono and Darussalam in supporting roles. Other cast members included HIM Damsyik and Rasyid Subadi.

The American visual anthropologist Karl G. Heider wrote that the Indonesian adaptation followed the Hollywood version closely, with some shots the same. He noted several differences, however. The man cast ashore with the children is not a cook, like in the American film, but Emi's father; the children meet and are ultimately deified by the natives of the island, rather than avoid them; the castaways learn of sex from watching a rape and not through experimentation; and ultimately the children return home of their own volition, rather than by accident.

== Themes ==
Heider described the islanders in Pengantin Pantai Biru are "ignoble savages" and "barbarians", a portrayal of tribal peoples common in contemporary Indonesian cinema; he noted comparable portrayals in Intan Perawan Kubu (The Virgin of Kubu), which takes place in Jambi, and Dia Sang Penakluk (She, the Conqueror), which takes place amidst the Dani of West Papua. Unlike the "fearsome" natives of the original film, which was based on a perception of natives as either noble or dangerous, Heider suggested that the "ludicrous" natives in Pengantin Pantai Biru were drawn from a prototype of a "funny dumb animal" similar to the orangutan.

== Release and reception ==
Pengantin Pantai Biru was released in 1983. It was a commercial failure. The film was banned as pornographic in East Kalimantan.

== Works cited ==
- Cowie, Peter, ed. (1985). International Film Guide. London: Tantivy Press. ISBN 9780900730245. OCLC 1586325.
- Heider, Karl G (1991). Indonesian Cinema: National Culture on Screen. Honolulu: University of Hawaii Press. ISBN 978-0-8248-1367-3.
- "Kredit Pengantin Pantai Biru" [Credits for Pengantin Pantai Biru]. filmindonesia.or.id (in Indonesian). Jakarta: Konfidan Foundation. Archived from the original on 4 March 2016.
- "Pengantin Pantai Biru". filmindonesia.or.id. Jakarta: Konfidan Foundation. Archived from the original on 6 March 2016.
- Prakuso, Bambang (1989). Kasus Kejahatan Seks: Hukum atau Keadilan? [Cases of Sex Crimes: Law or Justice?] (in Indonesian). Jakarta: Antar Kota. OCLC 22861303.
