= Awaludin =

Indonesian actor

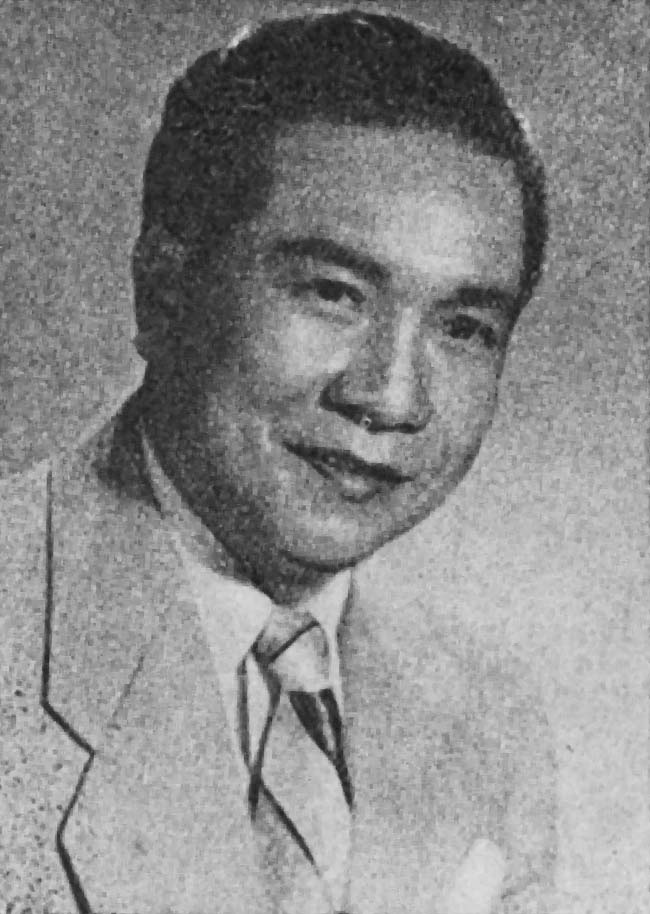
Awaludin in 1955

Awaludin or Awaluddin (11 November 1916 in Padang – 24 February 1980, in Jakarta) was an Indonesian actor, known for his roles from the 1950s–1970s. He was nominated for the Citra Award for Best Supporting Actor at the Indonesian Film Festival for his performance in the 1954 film Lewat Djam Malam.

== Filmography ==
=== 1950s ===
- Inspektur Rachman – 1950
- Akibat – 1951
- Bunga Rumah Makan – 1951
- Sepandjang Maliboro – 1951
- Rodrigo de Villa – 1952
- Dr. Samsi – 1952
- Leilani – 1953
- Bintang Baru – 1954
- Lewat Djam Malam – 1954
- Pegawai Tinggi – 1954
- Lagak International – 1955
- Tjalon Duta – 1955
- Kekasih Ajah – 1955
- Gadis Sesat – 1955
- Djanjiku – 1956
- Pemetjahan Polgami – 1956
- Karlina Marlina – 1957
- Taman Harapan – 1957
- Sekedjap Mata – 1959

==== 1960s ====
- Ibu Mertua – 1960
- Pesta Musik La Bana – 1960
- Santy – 1961
- Djakarta By Pass – 1962
- Tudju Pahlawan – 1963
- Bakti – 1963
- Penjesalan – 1964
- Manusia dan Pristiwa – 1968

==== 1970s ====
- Dibalik Pintu Dosa – 1970
- Tuan Tanah Kedawung – 1970
- Benyamin Brengsek – 1973
- Mei Lan, Aku Cinta Padamu – 1974
- Ratapan dan Rintihan – 1974
- Tarsan Kota – 1974
- Tarsan pensiunan – 1976
- Cinta Kasih Mama – 1976
- Suci Sang Primadona – 1977
- Istri Dulu Istri Sekarang – 1978
