= Saputangan =

- Pamphlet
- Directed by: Fred Young
- Screenplay by: Tan Tjoei Hock
- Starring: Chatir Harro; Noorsini; Astaman
- Production company: Bintang Soerabaja
- Release date: 1949 (Dutch East Indies)
- Countries: Dutch East Indies; Indonesia
- Language: Indonesian

Saputangan (Indonesian for Handkerchief) is a 1949 romance film from what is now Indonesia. (Note: The film was released during the Indonesian National Revolution, in which time Indonesia had declared itself independent while the Dutch East Indies was still formally in existence.) Directed by Fred Young and starring Chatir Harro, Noorsini, and Astaman, it follows a young doctor who, after his fiancée is blinded in an automobile accident, becomes an optometrist and restores her sight.

== Plot ==
As a sign of his love, the medical student Hardjono has given his fiancée Karnasih his handkerchief. After Hardjono finishes his final exams, his parents give him a new car, with which Hardjono takes Karnasih on holiday to Mega Mendung, near Bogor. However, during their excursion the car crashes into a log. Though Hardjono receives only minor injuries, Karnasih is blinded in the accident.

In the weeks afterwards, Karnasih—hoping to conceal her loss of sight and thus preserve his love for her—refuses to meet with Hardjono. Undaunted, Hardjono continues to contact her. When they do meet, Karnasih pretends that she can still see, a ruse which fails after Hardjono attempts to give her a handkerchief which has fallen to the ground.

Hardjono, hoping to become an optometrist and restore Karnasih's vision, decides to go abroad and receive further training. Karnasih, meanwhile, dedicates her time to educating poor children at her own school, the Taman Karnasih.

Six years pass, and Hardjono—having received the training he sought—returns. He operates on Karnasih. Six weeks pass, and Karnasih's vision is restored, allowing her to see her beloved again.

== Production ==
Saputangan was directed by Fred Young as the second film for his company Bintang Soerabaja, following Sehidup Semati (One in Life, One in Death). Young initially wrote the story as a stage play for his theatrical troupe, also named Bintang Soerabaja. The story was adapted into a screenplay by Tan Tjoei Hock, who had joined the company together with financier and film producer The Teng Chun. Production began in September 1949 and was, at the time, estimated to require two months of filming.

Though the film was shot in black-and-white, the titular handkerchiefs in Saputangan were hand-tinted. The Indonesian film historian Misbach Yusa Biran writes that this hand tinting, done owing to references to the handkerchiefs' colour, was done poorly, such that the colour was jittery.

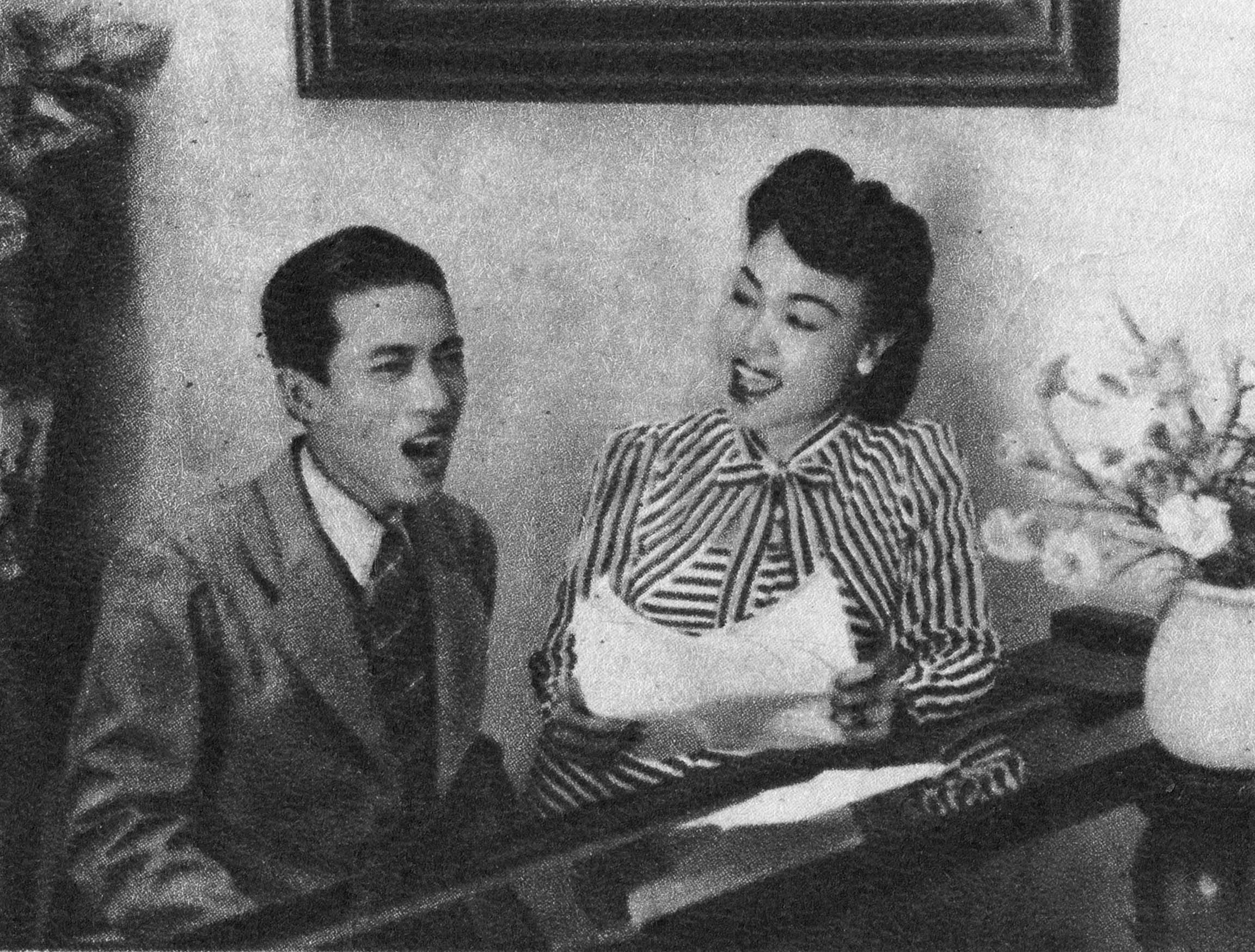
A scene from the film

The film starred Chatir Harro, Noorsini, and Astaman. It also featured Netty Herawaty, Darussalam, Ribut Rawit, Mohammad Jusuf, Sukarsih, R.A. Sri Mulat, Pak Kasur, and Lilik Sudjio. Its soundtrack featured seven songs, including "Inilah Laguku" ("This is My Song"), "Asmara Kelana" ("Love of the Wanderer"), "Saputangan" ("Handkerchief"), "Pulau Bali" ("The Island of Bali"), and "Saputangan Tanda Kasih" ("Handkerchief, Sign of Love").

== Release and reception ==
A novelisation of Saputangan was published by Gapura in 1949; the publishing house, owned by Andjar Asmara, had novelised all Indonesian films produced or in production since independence up to that point. The film was in theatres by February 1950, when it was screening in Jakarta. The film was exported to Singapore, where it was banned by the film censor Jack Evans in May 1950 for being "not up to standards"; J. B. Kristanto, in his Katalog Film Indonesia (Indonesian Film Catalogue), suggests that the issue was Communism-inspired dialogue. This ban was lifted on 1 June 1950, and Saputangan was soon screened to popular success at the Alhambra Theatre.

The reviewer for the Sunday Courier received Saputangan warmly, writing that the film was "unlike any other" (Note: Original: "Laen daripada jang laen.") and was the first Indonesian film to not feature any fighting.

Saputangan may now be lost. Movies were then shot on flammable nitrate film, and after a fire destroyed much of Produksi Film Negara's warehouse in 1952, old films shot on nitrate were deliberately destroyed. The American visual anthropologist Karl G. Heider writes that all Indonesian films from before 1950 are lost. However, Kristanto records several as having survived at Sinematek Indonesia's archives, and Biran writes that several Japanese propaganda films have survived at the Netherlands Government Information Service.

== Works cited ==
- Behague, John (14 May 1950). "The Big Ban: Censor Says 'No' to Four Films". The Straits Times. Singapore. p. 17 – via National Library of Singapore.
- Biran, Misbach Yusa (2009a). Sejarah Film 1900–1950: Bikin Film di Jawa [History of Film 1900–1950: Making Films in Java] (in Indonesian). Jakarta: Komunitas Bamboo working with the Jakarta Art Council. ISBN 978-979-3731-58-2.
- Biran, Misbach Yusa (2009b). Peran Pemuda dalam Kebangkitan Film Indonesia [The Role of the Youth in the Development of Indonesia Cinema] (in Indonesian). Jakarta: Ministry of Youth and Sports of Indonesia. OCLC 607257806.
- Biran, Misbach Yusa (2012). "Film di Masa Kolonial" [Film in the Colonial Period]. Indonesia dalam Arus Sejarah: Masa Pergerakan Kebangsaan [Indonesia in the Flow of Time: The Nationalist Movement] (in Indonesian). Vol. V. Jakarta: Ministry of Education and Culture. pp. 268–93. ISBN 978-979-9226-97-6.
- "Indonesische film" [Indonesian Film]. De Vrie Pers (in Dutch). Surabaya. 10 September 1949 – via Delpher.nl.
- "Censor's Ban Revoked: 'Saputangan'". The Straits Times. Singapore. 2 June 1950. p. 1 – via National Library of Singapore.
- "Lilik Sudjio". Filmindonesia.or.id (in Indonesian). Jakarta: Konfiden Foundation. Archived from the original on 4 April 2016.
- Heider, Karl G (1991). Indonesian Cinema: National Culture on Screen. Honolulu: University of Hawaii Press. ISBN 978-0-8248-1367-3.
- Saputangan (brochure) (in Indonesian), Bintang Soerabaja Film Corporation, 1949
- "Saputangan". filmindonesia.or.id (in Indonesian). Jakarta: Konfiden Foundation. Archived from the original on 31 October 2013.
- "'Three Came Home' Passed on Appeal". The Straits Times. Singapore. 15 June 1950. p. 1 – via National Library of Singapore.
- "Usaha Penerbitan Gapura" [The Publisher Gapura]. Java Bode (in Indonesian). Jakarta. 1 October 1949 – via Delpher.nl.
- "Waar Gaan We Heen? Djakarta" [Where are We Going? Jakarta]. Java Bode (in Dutch). Jakarta. 24 February 1950 – via Delpher.nl.
