= Raja Dangdut =

- poster film
- Directed by: Maman Firmansjah
- Written by: Rhoma Irama
- Produced by: Ny. Lucy Sukardi
- Starring: Rhoma Irama; Ida Royani; Marlia Hardi; Aedy Moward; Netty Herawaty; Naniek Nurcahyani
- Edited by: Tantra Surjadi
- Music by: Rhoma Irama
- Distributed by: PT. Cipta Permai Indah Film
- Release date: 1978
- Running time: 102 minutes
- Country: Indonesia
- Language: Indonesian

Raja Dangdut is a film directed by Maman Firmansyah.

== Synopsis ==
Despite the already successful and have a lot of fans, Rhoma remains as usual, obedient to parents and pious. There was one girl fans are up to 100 times corresponded, Ida (Ida Royani). Rhoma sympathy and love. Ida thousands of poor widows seller hodgepodge. Rhoma's Mother (Netty Herawaty) Rhoma match with another girl, Mira (Naniek Nurcahyani) more modern and noble, while the father relented only Rhoma paralyzed. Rhoma reject the choice of his mother and his mother face challenges and Mira, among others booed Ida and went to shaman everything. Mira attitude that "modern" is not pleasing to Rhoma. After the accident and assisted Ida Mira, then Mira attitude changed. Then Ida and Rhoma officially married.

== Cast ==
- Rhoma Irama as Rhoma Irama
- Ida Royani as Ida
- Netty Herawaty as Rhoma's mother
- Naniek Nurcahyani as Mira
- Marlia Hardi as Mrs. Ida
- Aedy Moward as a Rhoma's father
- Urip Arphan as Shaman
- Alwi A. S. as a prince
- Yusfhani S. Martha
- Lina Budiarti
- Wiwiek Sulistiawati

== Soundtrack ==
Raja Dangdut

Soundtrack album by Rhoma Irama
- Released: 1978
- Recorded: Naviri
- Genre: Dangdut
- Label: Naviri

Rhoma Irama chronology
Begadang	Raja Dangdut	Cinta Segitiga

This album has 5 new songs by Rhoma Irama with vocals performed by Ida Royani.

Soundtrack film
No	Title	Singer
1	Rhoma-Ida	Rhoma Irama & Ida Royani
2	Bunga Surga	Rhoma Irama & Ida Royani
3	Laailahaillallah	Rhoma Irama
4	Malapetaka	Rhoma Irama
5	Mengapa	Ida Royani
