= Selamat Berdjuang, Masku! =

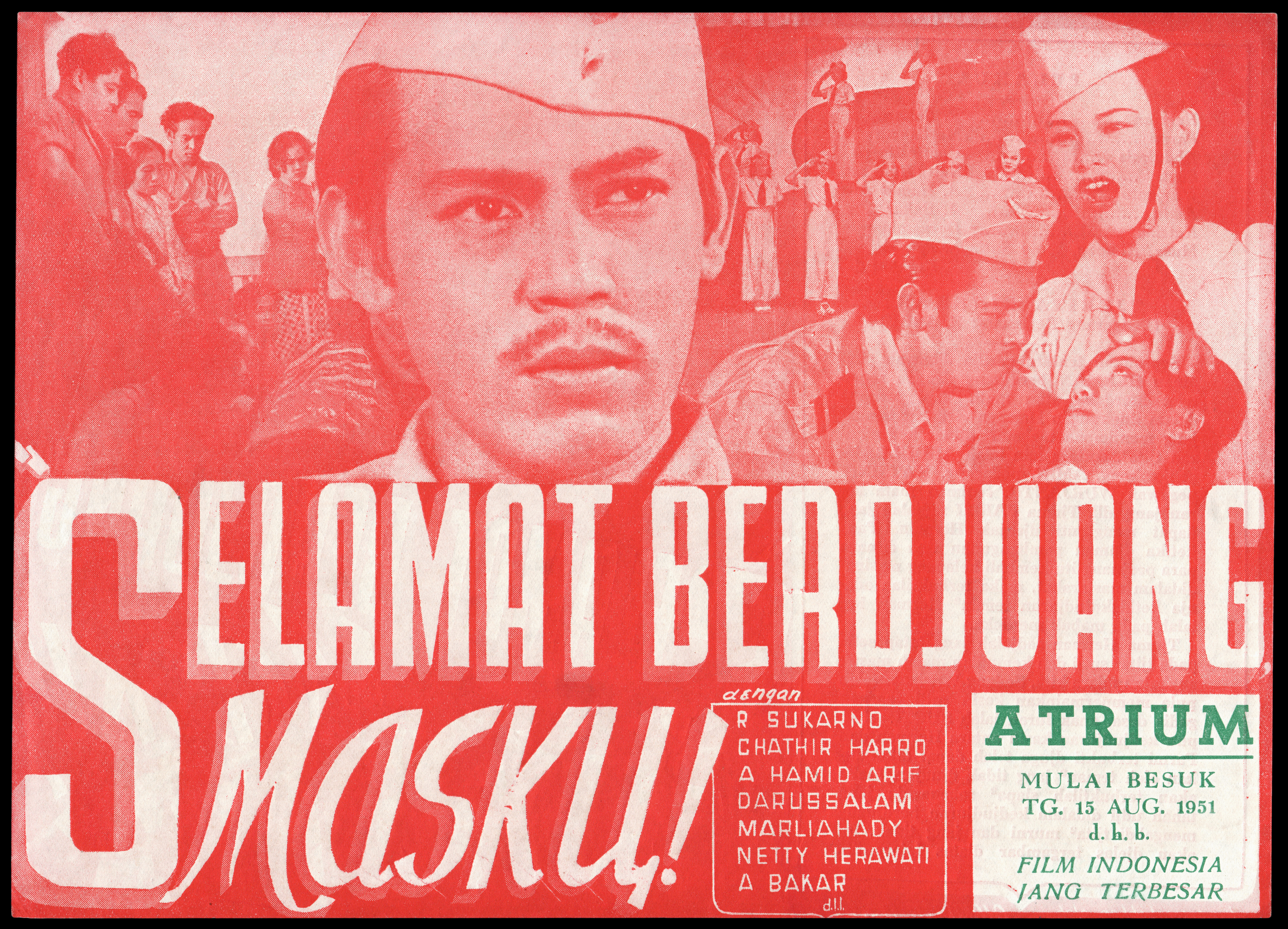
- Flyer (Atrium Theatre, Malang)
- Directed by: R.H. Andjar Subyanto
- Written by: R.H. Andjar Subyanto
- Starring: Raden Sukarno; Marlia Hardi
- Release date: 1951
- Country: Indonesia
- Language: Indonesian

Selamat Berdjuang, Masku! (Perfected Spelling: Selamat Berjuang, Masku!, Indonesian for "Fight Well, My Brother!") is a 1951 Indonesian film directed by R.H. Andjar Subyanto and starring Raden Sukarno and Marlia Hardi. It follows a former guerrilla leader who must pursue his love despite the interference of his former comrades.

== Plot ==
During the Indonesian National Revolution, Herman (Raden Sukarno) is the leader of a group of guerrillas, including the womanizing artist Wurjanto (A. Hamid Arief), the arrogant Abdul Rais (Chatir Harro), the trader Amin (A. Bakar), and the former office worker Katsina (Darussalam). After the war, only Herman maintains his ideology and joins the Indonesian Air Force, whereas his fellow guerrillas return to their respective fields. He also maintains a loving relationship with Parmi (Marlia Hardi), and stays faithful to her despite intervention from Herman's former colleagues, including Wurjanto, who has stolen the heart of Surti (Netty Herawaty), a young village woman.

== Production ==
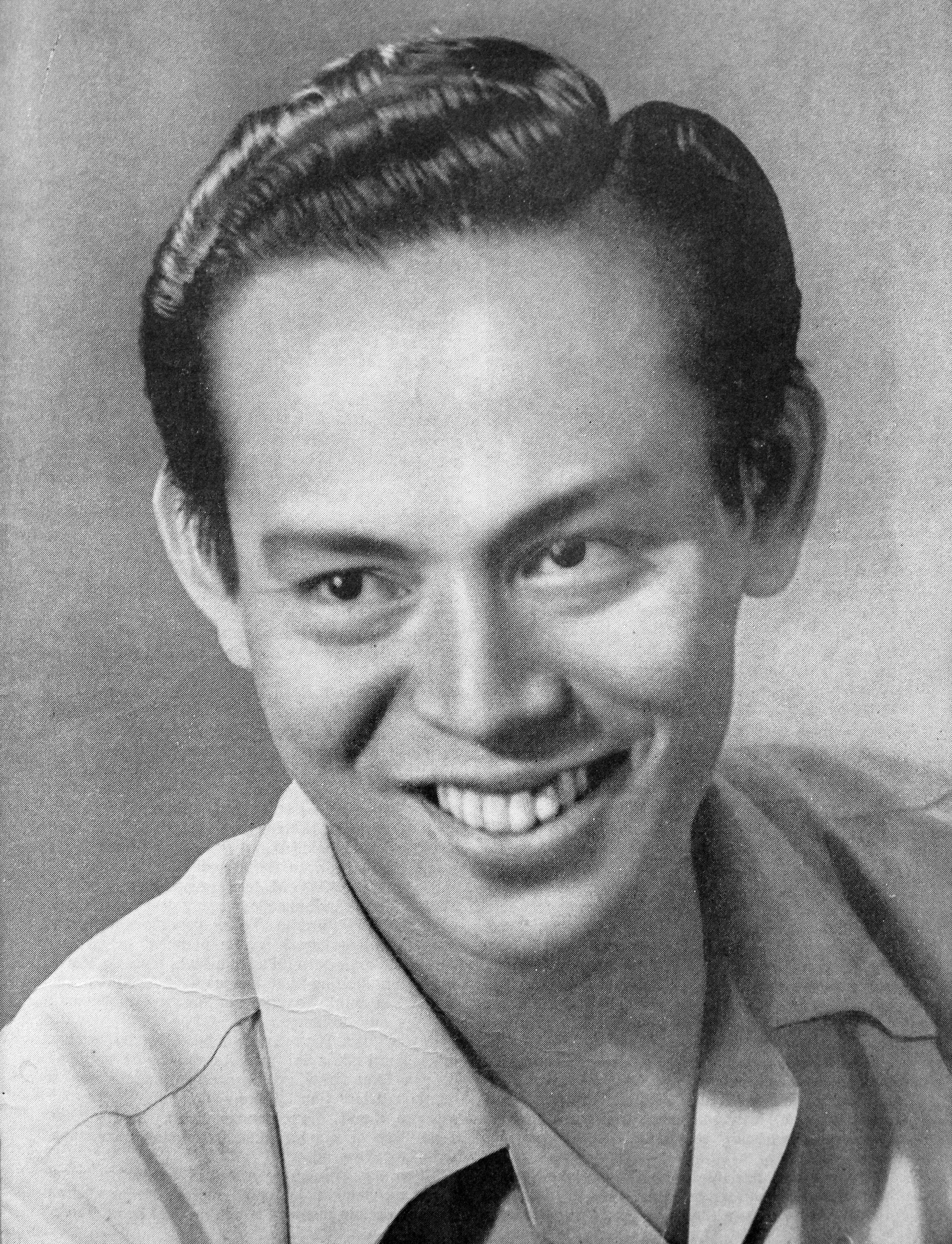
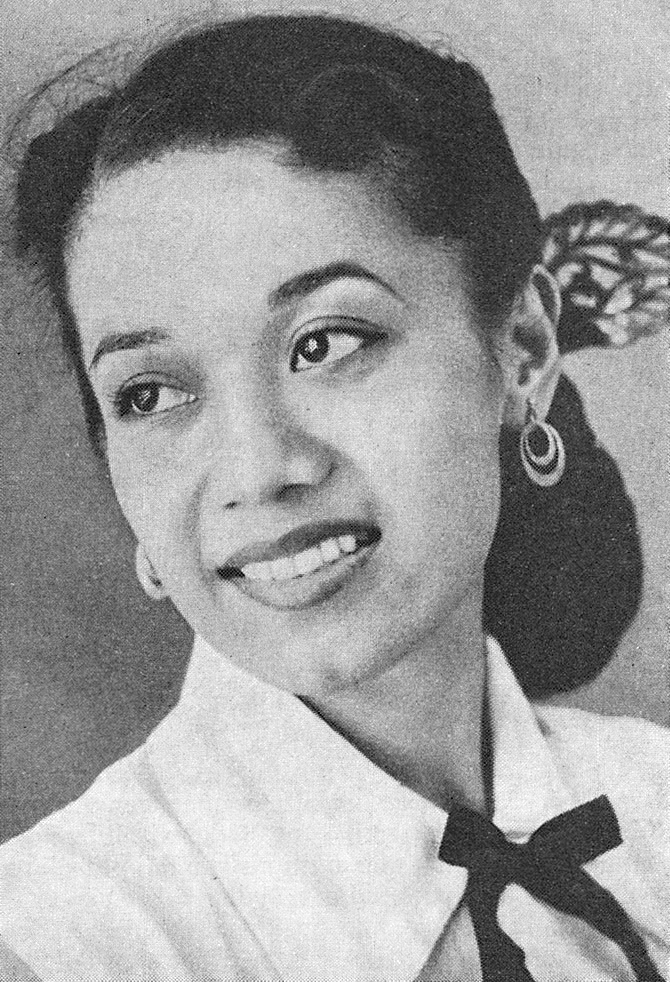
Raden Sukarno and Marlia Hardi, the film's stars

Selamat Berdjuang, Masku! was written and directed by R.H. Andjar Subyanto (credited as H. Asby) for Djakarta Film, a subsidiary of Fred Young's Bintang Surabaja. It was his second film for the company, following Pelarian dari Pagar Besi (1951). The black-and-white film starred Raden Sukarno and Marlia Hardi in the lead roles, supported by A. Hamid Arief and Netty Herawaty. The film also featured Chatir Harro, A. Bakar, Darussalam, Musa, Wolly Sutinah, Pak Ali, and Rochani in various parts.

Selamat Berdjuang, Masku! was produced at during a period when several companies were producing films about or touching on the Indonesian National Revolution, including Perfini (Darah dan Doa, 1950; Enam Djam di Jogja, 1951), Persari (Sepandjang Malioboro, 1950; Hampir Malam di Djogja, 1951), and Bintang Surabaja (Djembatan Merah, 1950). The Indonesian film historian Misbach Yusa Biran writes that, aside from those films produced by Perfini, none of these productions dealt with the nationalistic ideals and struggle underlying the revolution. The film critic Salim Said, however, argues that the depiction of waylaid guerrillas in Embun (Perfini, 1952) and Selamat Berdjuang, Masku! led to a decline in the production of films about the revolution.

== Release ==
Selamat Berdjuang, Masku! was released in 1951, with its Malang debut on 15 August of that year—two days before independence day celebrations. A novelisation, by Suma Indra, was published by Gapura in their Roman Layar Putih ('Silver Screen Novels') series.

== Works cited ==
- Biran, Misbach Yusa, ed. (1979). Apa Siapa Orang Film Indonesia 1926–1978 [What and Who: Film Figures in Indonesia, 1926–1978] (in Indonesian). Jakarta: Sinematek Indonesia. OCLC 6655859.
- Biran, Misbach Yusa (2009). Peran Pemuda dalam Kebangkitan Film Indonesia [The Role of the Youth in the Development of the Indonesian Film Industry] (in Indonesian). Jakarta: Ministry of Youth and Sports. OCLC 607257806.
- Kristanto, JB, ed. (2007). Katalog Film Indonesia 1926–2007. Jakarta: Nalar. ISBN 978-979-26-9006-4.
- Said, Salim (1991). Pantulan Layar Putih: Film Indonesia dalam Kritik dan Komentar [Song of the White Screen: Indonesian Films in Critique and Commentary] (in Indonesian). Jakarta: Sinar Harapan. ISBN 978-979-416-137-1.
- Selamat Berdjuang, Masku! (brochure) (in Indonesian), Djakarta Film Company, 1951
- Selamat Berdjuang, Masku!. WorldCat. OCLC 38304968.
