= Oma Irama Penasaran =

1976 film by A. Harris

- Directed by: A. Harris
- Written by: Deddy Armand
- Produced by: Tedjo Kusumo
- Starring: Rhoma Irama; Yati Octavia; Aminah Cendrakasih; A. Hamid Arief; Netty Herawaty; Maruli Sitompul; Aedy Moward
- Cinematography: Syamsudin
- Edited by: Rizal Asmar
- Release date: 1976
- Running time: 100 minutes
- Country: Indonesia
- Language: Bahasa Indonesia

Oma Irama Penasaran is an Indonesian film directed by A. Harris and starring Rhoma Irama and Yati Octavia. According to Andrew N, Weintraub the film "paints a picture of an underclass boy who falls in love with a girl whose family is rich".
