= After the Curfew =

- Indonesian theatrical poster
- Indonesian: Lewat Djam Malam
- Directed by: Usmar Ismail
- Written by: Asrul Sani
- Produced by: Usmar Ismail
- Starring: A.N. Alcaff; Netty Herawaty; Dhalia; Bambang Hermanto; Awaludin; Titien Sumarni; R.D. Ismail; Aedy Moward
- Cinematography: Max Tera
- Distributed by: Perfini; Persari
- Release date: May 1954
- Running time: 101 minutes
- Country: Indonesia
- Language: Indonesian

After the Curfew (Indonesian: Lewat Djam Malam) is a 1954 Indonesian film directed and produced by Usmar Ismail and written by Asrul Sani. Widely regarded as a classic of Indonesian cinema, the film follows an ex-soldier in his vigilante actions against corruption.

== Plot ==
Shortly after the Dutch recognition of Indonesia's independence in 1949, the military in Bandung, West Java, establishes a curfew. Iskandar (A.N. Alcaff) has been released from the Indonesian Armed Forces and is almost shot when he arrives in Bandung. He stays at the home of his fiancée Norma (Netty Herawaty) and her family. The following day, Norma's father sets Iskandar up with a job at the governor's office while Norma and her brother go shopping for a welcome-home party. The job goes poorly, and Iskandar is quickly fired.

He goes to see his former squad member, Gafar, who is now a successful building contractor, and explains that he feels that nobody understands him as a revolutionary, and that he still hears the screams of a family that he had killed. Iskandar then asks Gafar where their leader, Gunawan, is. Gafar tells Iskandar, but says Iskandar should not go. The former lieutenant ignores this advice and goes to see Gunawan, who now works to nationalise the economy and is not afraid to use force against his competitors. Gunawan wants to use Iskandar as a hired hand to threaten another businessman, but Iskandar refuses, storming out of the office.

Iskandar soon comes across another squadmate, Puja, who has left the army and become a pimp. He sees that Puja is addicted to gambling and mistreats his only prostitute, Laila (Dhalia). Iskandar stays and talks with Laila while Puja gambles, then goes back to talk to Gafar. Gafar reveals that the family Iskandar killed under Gunawan's orders were not Dutch spies, but refugees, and that the jewellery stolen from the family had been used to establish Gunawan's business. Iskandar swears revenge, then returns to Norma's for the party.

After Iskandar accidentally spills water on a girl's dress at the party, for which he is scolded, he goes to his room and takes his revolver. He then goes out, looking for a way to escape the guilt he is feeling. After he reaches Puja's house, the pimp says that they should kill Gunawan. They go together to their former leader's house, where Iskandar accuses the latter of corruption and pulls the revolver on him. Gunawan stutters that it was for the good of the country, and is shot. Meanwhile, Norma, worried about Iskandar, has gone out searching.

The two men panic and rush out of Gunawan's home. At Puja's home, the pimp asks why Iskandar shot Gunawan. Iskandar calls him a coward and hits him. Laila, who has been watching this, says that Norma had come searching. Iskandar goes back to the party, but after a policeman – who had been invited – mentions that there had been a murder, he escapes again. He is picked up shortly by the military police, then runs away to Gafar's home. The contractor tells Iskandar that he should have put the past behind him, then says that Norma had come by earlier. Iskandar rushes back to her home, but is spotted by the patrols. He is shot and killed at Norma's doorstep, as the guests watch.

== Cast ==
- A.N. Alcaff as Iskandar
- Netty Herawaty as Norma
- Awaludin as Gafar
- R.D. Ismail as Gunawan
- Bambang Hermanto as Puja
- Dhalia as Laila
- Aedy Moward as Adlin
- Titien Sumarni as Ida
- Abdul Hadi as Norma's father
- Astaman
- Wahid Chan
- S. Tahar Nunu
- Lukman Jusuf

== Production ==
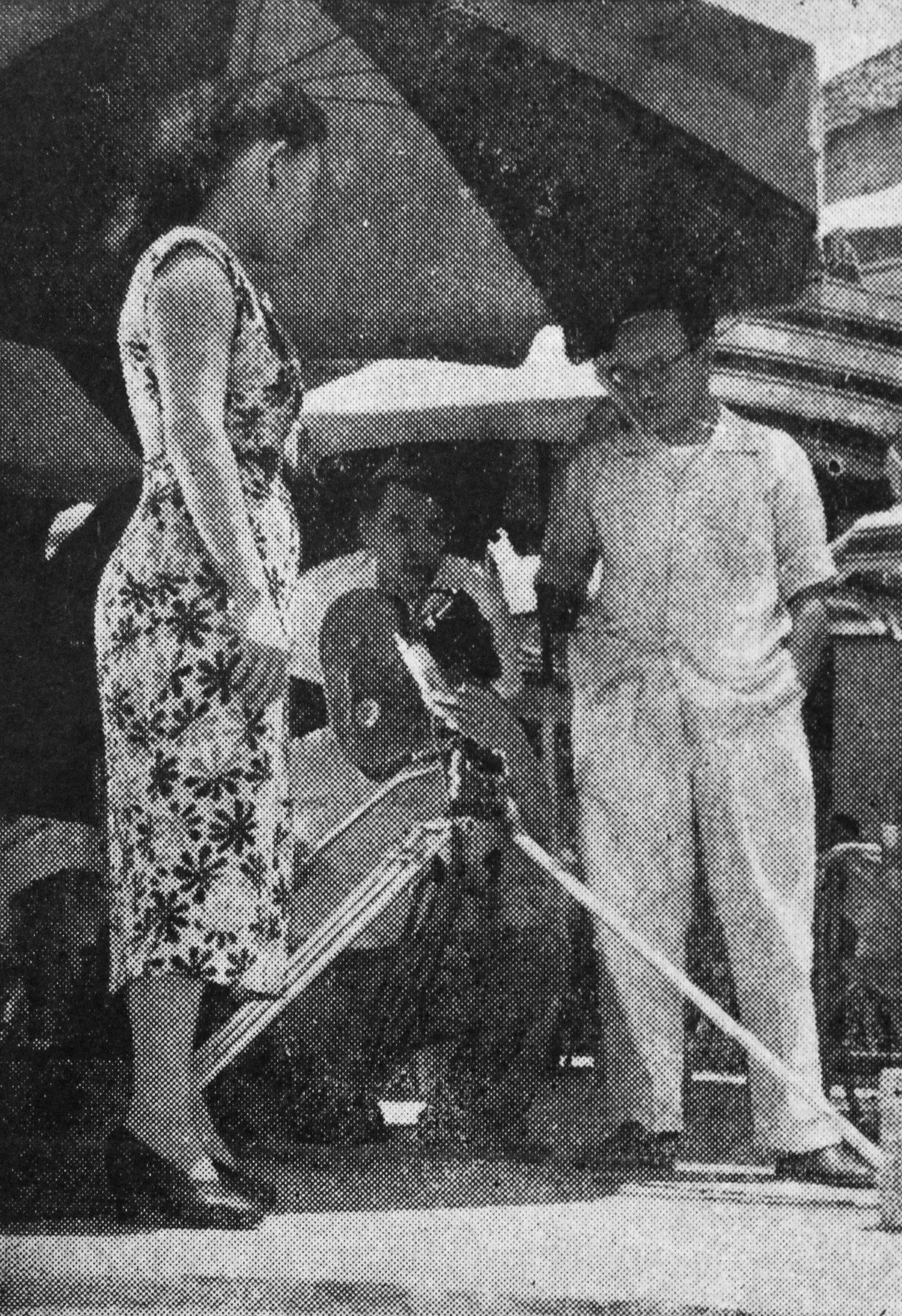
Netty Herawaty on the set of Lewat Djam Malam with director Usmar Ismail

Lewat Djam Malam was directed by Usmar Ismail, regarded as a pioneer of film in Indonesia. Usmar had been a soldier during the revolution; according to film critic and director Marselli Sumarno, this made the film's portrayal of soldiers more realistic. The screenplay was the first written by Asrul Sani. Farida Arriany was offered a role as companion of AN Alcaff's by Usmar but the role later went to Netty Herawaty.

The film was produced by Perfini, a film studio Ismail had established in 1950. According to the film historian Misbach Yusa Biran, it was the first Indonesian film made explicitly to be shown abroad.

== Release and reception ==
Lewat Djam Malam was first screened domestically in May 1954. It was initially meant to be screened at the Asian Film Festival in Tokyo, but the Indonesian government refused to allow the screening, apparently as a protest against the failure of the Japanese government to punish Japanese troops who had committed crimes during their occupation of Indonesia from 1942 to 1945.

Lewat Djam Malam is generally considered a classic of Indonesian cinema. Film historian JB Kristanto writes that Lewat Djam Malam was Ismail's work which most showed Indonesian history; he considers Ismail the first Indonesian director to use film as a means of expression and not simply as a way to make money, and opines that no film in Indonesian history could match Ismail's achievements with Lewat Djam Malam. Karl G. Heider, writing in 1991, stated that the film is a strong example of early Indonesian films, with an emphasis on individualism.

== Restoration ==
The master copies of Lewat Djam Malam were stored at Sinematek Indonesia when the film archive was established in the 1970s. When government funding ceased in 2001, the institution was unable to properly care for the celluloid, which led to the decay of many films. Beginning in 2010 on recommendation of JB Kristanto, the National Museum of Singapore (NMS) and the World Cinema Foundation, in collaboration with Sinematek Indonesia, the Konfiden Foundation and Kineforum, began work on restoring the film; this restoration was meant as an impetus to better preserve classic Indonesian movies.

The restoration, which cost $200,000 Singapore dollars and was done by L'Immagine Ritrovata in Italy, took over a year and a half. The director of L'Immagine, Davide Pozzi, stated that the film was in fairly good condition excepting a bit of mould. The existence of negatives also simplified the restoration. The result was first screened at the NMS in March. The film was then shown at the 2012 Cannes Film Festival as part of the World Classic Cinema entry on 17 May. The restoration received a theatrical release in Indonesia beginning on 21 June 2012 and was screened at the London Film Festival in October 2012.

== Awards ==
Lewat Djam Malam was in competition for eight awards at the inaugural Indonesian Film Festival in 1955, winning five; several of these were shared with Lilik Sudjio's Tarmina. It was also screened at the 1955 Asian Film Festival.

Award	Year	Category	Recipient	Result
Indonesian Film Festival	1955	Best Picture		Won
Indonesian Film Festival	1955	Best Screenwriter	Asrul Sani	Won (Note: Special mention for dialogue)
Indonesian Film Festival	1955	Best Leading Actor	AN Alcaff	Won
Indonesian Film Festival	1955	Best Leading Actress	Dhalia	Won
Indonesian Film Festival	1955	Best Supporting Actor	Bambang Hermanto	Nominated
Indonesian Film Festival	1955	Best Supporting Actor	Awaludin	Nominated
Indonesian Film Festival	1955	Best Artistic Direction	Chalid Arifin	Won (Note: Special mention for artistic direction)
Asian Film Festival	1955	Best Director	Usmar Ismail	Nominated
