= Djamaluddin Malik =

Indonesian film producer, politician

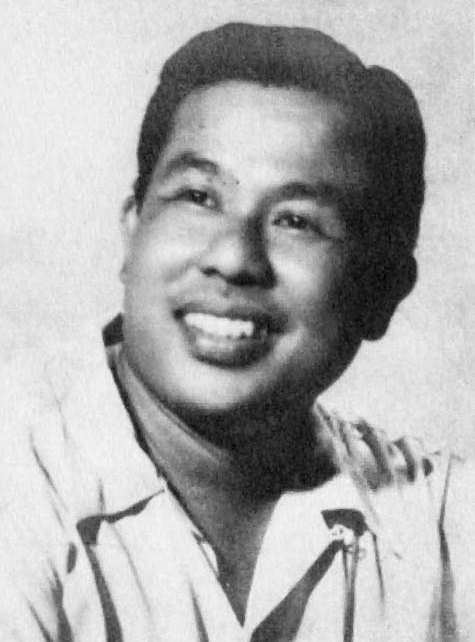
- Malik, c. 1955
- Born: 13 February 1917; Padang, Indonesia
- Died: 8 June 1970 (aged 53); Munich, Germany
- Occupation: film producer

Djamaluddin Malik (13 February 1917 – 8 June 1970) was a prominent Indonesian film producer, politician, entrepreneur. He founded the Jakarta Indonesian company Persari Film.

== Personal life ==
Malik was born in Padang, West Sumatra. His father was a Pagaruyung descendant, in the Minangkabau hinterland. He died in Munich, Germany in 1970. During his lifetime in Senen his friends called him "the king of artists".

== Career ==
Malik started his career in the Dutch shipping business, then worked in a Dutch trading company, where he gained experience in business and finance, so that he could eventually found his own company.

In 1942, he entered the world of art and culture. He started a theatrical group, Panca Warna. To help Indonesian independence, he showed around Indonesia to inspire spirit and patriotism. In 1951, Djamaluddin established and became President of PT Persari (Perseroan Artis Indonesia). In this effort, he was inspired by United Artists in Hollywood, United States. Persari has a complete film studio in Jatinegara. During the same time Malik was President of the electrical installation company Prapatak and of the weaving company PT Cimalaka in Sumedang, West Java.

Djamaluddin Malik was the Nahdlatul Ulama politician and the member of People's Representative Council. He was also as the chairman of National Film Council.

== Family ==
Malik married Elly Yunara. They had four children: Zainal Malik, Camelia Malik, Yudha Asmara Malik, and Lailasari Malik. Camelia follows his career, as an actress and pop-dangdut singer. His wife continued the family interests by founding PT. Remaja Ellynda Film. It successfully produced Malin Kundang and Jembatan Merah.

== Awards ==
The government appointed Djamaluddin and Usmar Ismail as Cinema of Indonesian figures.

== Filmography ==
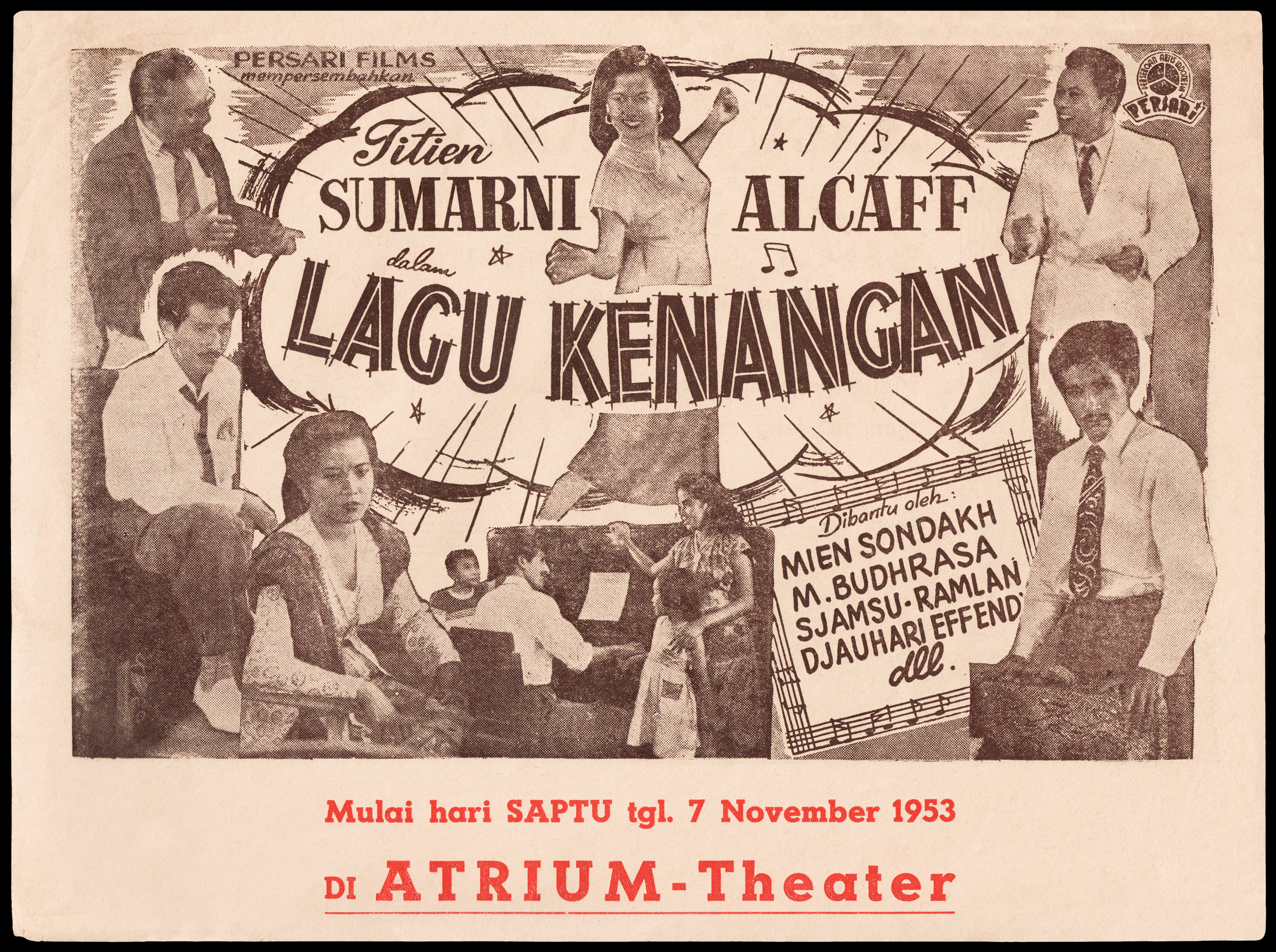
Lagu Kenangan (1953)

1. Rodrigo de Villa (1952)
2. Leilani (1953)
3. Lagu Kenangan (1953)
4. Tabu (1953)
5. Supir Istimewa (1954)
6. Tarmina (1955)
7. Ratu Asia
8. Tauhid (1964)
