= List of British films of 1952 =

British films released in 1952

A list of films produced in the United Kingdom in 1952 (see 1952 in film): Leading British production or distribution companies included General Film Distributors, Associated British and British Lion. Hollywood studios also invested in British-based productions.

== A–H ==
Title	Director	Cast	Genre	Notes
13 East Street	Robert S. Baker	Patrick Holt, Sandra Dorne, Sonia Holm	Thriller	
24 Hours of a Woman's Life	Victor Saville	Merle Oberon, Richard Todd, Leo Genn	Drama	
Angels One Five	George More O'Ferrall	Jack Hawkins, Michael Denison, Dulcie Gray	World War II	
The Armchair Detective	Brendan J. Stafford	Ernest Dudley, Hartley Power, Derek Elphinstone	Mystery	
Blind Man's Bluff	Charles Saunders	Zena Marshall, Sydney Tafler, Russell Napier	Crime	
Brandy for the Parson	John Eldridge	Kenneth More, James Donald, Jean Lodge	Comedy	
The Brave Don't Cry	Philip Leacock	John Gregson, Andrew Keir, Fulton Mackay	Drama	
The Card	Ronald Neame	Alec Guinness, Petula Clark, Glynis Johns	Romantic comedy	
Castle in the Air	Henry Cass	David Tomlinson, Helen Cherry, Margaret Rutherford	Comedy	
Circumstantial Evidence	Daniel Birt	Rona Anderson, Patrick Holt, John Warwick	Crime	
Come Back Peter	Charles Saunders	Patrick Holt, Peter Hammond, Humphrey Lestocq	Comedy	
Come Die My Love	Luis Marquina	Honor Blackman, Gérard Tichy, José Bódalo	Drama	Co-production with the Spain
The Crimson Pirate	Robert Siodmak	Burt Lancaster, Eva Bartok, Torin Thatcher	Adventure	
Crow Hollow	Michael McCarthy	Donald Houston, Natasha Parry, Patricia Owens	Drama	
Curtain Up	Ralph Smart	Robert Morley, Margaret Rutherford, Kay Kendall	Comedy	
Death of an Angel	Charles Saunders	Patrick Barr, Jane Baxter, Jean Lodge	Crime	
Derby Day	Herbert Wilcox	Anna Neagle, Michael Wilding, Googie Withers	Drama	
Distant Trumpet	Terence Fisher	Derek Bond, Derek Elphinstone Keith Pyott	Drama	
Down Among the Z Men	Maclean Rogers	Peter Sellers, Harry Secombe, Spike Milligan	Comedy	
Emergency Call	Lewis Gilbert	Jack Warner, Anthony Steel, Joy Shelton	Drama	
Escape Route	Seymour Friedman, Peter Graham Scott	George Raft, Sally Gray, Clifford Evans	Thriller	
Father's Doing Fine	Henry Cass	Richard Attenborough, Heather Thatcher, Virginia McKenna	Comedy	
The Floating Dutchman	Vernon Sewell	Dermot Walsh, Sydney Tafler, Mary Germaine	Crime	
Folly to Be Wise	Frank Launder	Alastair Sim, Elizabeth Allan, Roland Culver	Comedy	
The Frightened Man	John Gilling	Dermot Walsh, Barbara Murray, Charles Victor	Crime	
The Gentle Gunman	Basil Dearden	John Mills, Dirk Bogarde, Elizabeth Sellars	Drama	
Ghost Ship	Vernon Sewell	Dermot Walsh, Hazel Court, Hugh Latimer	Horror, Thriller	
Gift Horse	Compton Bennett	Trevor Howard, Richard Attenborough, James Donald	War	
Girdle of Gold	Montgomery Tully	Esmond Knight, Maudie Edwards, Meredith Edwards	Comedy	
Hammer the Toff	Maclean Rogers	John Bentley, Patricia Dainton, Valentine Dyall	Crime	
The Happy Family	Muriel Box	Stanley Holloway, Kathleen Harrison, Naunton Wayne	Comedy	
Hindle Wakes	Arthur Crabtree	Lisa Daniely, Brian Worth, Sandra Dorne	Drama	
His Excellency	Robert Hamer	Eric Portman, Cecil Parker, Susan Stephen	Drama	
The Holly and the Ivy	George More O'Ferrall	Ralph Richardson, Celia Johnson, Margaret Leighton	Drama	
Home at Seven	Ralph Richardson	Ralph Richardson, Margaret Leighton, Jack Hawkins	Drama	
Hot Ice	Kenneth Hume	John Justin, Barbara Murray, Ivor Barnard	Comedy crime	
The Hour of 13	Harold French	Peter Lawford, Dawn Addams, Roland Culver	Mystery	
Hunted	Charles Crichton	Dirk Bogarde, Jon Whiteley, Elizabeth Sellars, Kay Walsh	Crime/drama	Golden Leopard winner at Locarno International Film Festival

== I–Z ==
Title	Director	Cast	Genre	Notes
I Believe in You	Basil Dearden	Celia Johnson, Cecil Parker, Harry Fowler	Drama	
I'm a Stranger	Brock Williams	Greta Gynt, James Hayter, Hector Ross	Comedy	
The Importance of Being Earnest	Anthony Asquith	Michael Redgrave, Michael Denison, Edith Evans	Comedy	Adaptation of the play by Oscar Wilde
It Started in Paradise	Compton Bennett	Jane Hylton, Muriel Pavlow, Martita Hunt	Drama	
Ivanhoe	Richard Thorpe	Robert Taylor, Elizabeth Taylor, Joan Fontaine	Historical	
Judgment Deferred	John Baxter	Hugh Sinclair, Joan Collins Helen Shingler	Drama	
A Killer Walks	Ronald Drake	Laurence Harvey, Susan Shaw, Laurence Naismith	Crime	
King of the Underworld	Victor M. Gover	Tod Slaughter, Patrick Barr, Tucker McGuire	Crime	
Lady in the Fog	Sam Newfield	Cesar Romero, Lois Maxwell, Bernadette O'Farrell	Mystery	
The Last Page	Terence Fisher	George Brent, Marguerite Chapman, Diana Dors	Crime	
Little Big Shot	Jack Raymond	Ronald Shiner, Marie Lohr, Derek Farr	Comedy	
The Lost Hours	David MacDonald	Mark Stevens, Jean Kent, Garry Marsh	Mystery	
Love's a Luxury	Francis Searle	Hugh Wakefield, Derek Bond, Zena Marshall	Comedy	
Made in Heaven	John Paddy Carstairs	David Tomlinson, Petula Clark, Sonja Ziemann	Comedy	
The Man Who Watched Trains Go By	Harold French	Claude Rains, Marius Goring, Märta Torén	Crime	
Mandy	Alexander Mackendrick, Fred Sears	Phyllis Calvert, Jack Hawkins, Terence Morgan	Drama	Ealing Studios
Men Against the Sun	Brendan J. Stafford	John Bentley, Zena Marshall	Adventure	
Meet Me Tonight	Anthony Pelissier	Valerie Hobson, Nigel Patrick, Stanley Holloway	Comedy	
Miss Robin Hood	John Guillermin	Margaret Rutherford, Richard Hearne, Michael Medwin	Comedy	
Monte Carlo Baby	Jean Boyer	Audrey Hepburn, Cara Williams, Philippe Lemaire	Comedy	
Mother Riley Meets the Vampire	John Gilling	Arthur Lucan, Bela Lugosi, Dora Bryan	Comedy	
Moulin Rouge	John Huston	José Ferrer, Zsa Zsa Gabor, Suzanne Flon	Biopic	
My Death Is a Mockery	Tony Young	Donald Houston, Kathleen Byron, Bill Kerr	Crime drama	
My Wife's Lodger	Maurice Elvey	Dominic Roche, Olive Sloane, Diana Dors	Comedy	
Never Look Back	Francis Searle	Rosamund John, Hugh Sinclair, Guy Middleton	Drama	
The Night Won't Talk	Daniel Birt	John Bailey, Hy Hazell, Mary Germaine	Crime	
Outcast of the Islands	Carol Reed	Trevor Howard, Ralph Richardson, Robert Morley	Drama	
Paul Temple Returns	Maclean Rogers	John Bentley, Patricia Dainton, Peter Gawthorne	Thriller	
Penny Princess	Val Guest	Yolande Donlan, Dirk Bogarde, Reginald Beckwith	Comedy	
The Pickwick Papers	Noel Langley	James Hayter, Hermione Baddeley, Nigel Patrick	Comedy	
The Planter's Wife	Ken Annakin	Claudette Colbert, Jack Hawkins, Anthony Steel	Adventure drama	
Private Information	Fergus McDonell	Jill Esmond, Jack Watling, Carol Marsh	Drama	
Reluctant Heroes	Jack Raymond	Ronald Shiner, Derek Farr, Christine Norden	Comedy	
The Ringer	Guy Hamilton	Herbert Lom, Mai Zetterling, Greta Gynt	Mystery	
Salute the Toff	Maclean Rogers	John Bentley, Carol Marsh, Valentine Dyall	Crime	
Saturday Island	Stuart Heisler	Linda Darnell, Tab Hunter, Donald Gray	Adventure romance	
The Second Mrs Tanqueray	Dallas Bower	Pamela Brown, Hugh Sinclair, Virginia McKenna	Drama	
Secret People	Thorold Dickinson	Audrey Hepburn, Valentina Cortese, Serge Reggiani	Spy thriller	
Sing Along with Me	Peter Graham Scott	Donald Peers, Dodo Watts, Dennis Vance	Musical	
So Little Time	Compton Bennett	Marius Goring, Maria Schell, Lucie Mannheim	Romance	
Something Money Can't Buy	Pat Jackson	Patricia Roc, Anthony Steel, Moira Lister	Comedy drama	
Song of Paris	John Guillermin	Dennis Price, Anne Vernon, Mischa Auer	Comedy	
The Sound Barrier	David Lean	Ralph Richardson, Ann Todd, Nigel Patrick	Drama	
Stolen Face	Terence Fisher	Paul Henreid, Lizabeth Scott, André Morell	Drama	
The Story of Robin Hood and His Merrie Men	Ken Annakin	Richard Todd, Joan Rice, Peter Finch	Adventure	
The Stranger Left No Card	Wendy Toye	Alan Badel, Geoffrey Bayldon, Eileen Way	short Drama	
The Tall Headlines	Terence Young	Mai Zetterling, Michael Denison, André Morell	Crime	
Time Gentlemen, Please!	Lewis Gilbert	Eddie Byrne, Raymond Lovell, Hermione Baddeley	Comedy	
Top Secret	Mario Zampi	George Cole, Oskar Homolka, Nadia Gray	Comedy	
Tread Softly	David MacDonald	Frances Day, Patricia Dainton, John Bentley	Crime	
Treasure Hunt	John Paddy Carstairs	Martita Hunt, Jimmy Edwards, Naunton Wayne	Comedy	
Trent's Last Case	Herbert Wilcox	Michael Wilding, Margaret Lockwood, Orson Welles	Detective	
Venetian Bird	Ralph Thomas	Richard Todd, Eva Bartok, John Gregson	Thriller	
The Voice of Merrill	John Gilling	Valerie Hobson, James Robertson Justice, Garry Marsh	Mystery	
The Wallet	Morton Lewis	John Longden, Chili Bouchier, Hilda Fenemore	Crime	
Where's Charley?	David Butler	Ray Bolger, Allyn Ann McLerie, Margaretta Scott	Musical	
Whispering Smith Hits London	Francis Searle	Richard Carlson, Greta Gynt, Herbert Lom	Mystery	
Who Goes There!	Anthony Kimmins	Nigel Patrick, Valerie Hobson, George Cole	Comedy	
Wide Boy	Ken Hughes	Sydney Tafler, Susan Shaw, Ronald Howard	Crime	
Wings of Danger	Terence Fisher	Zachary Scott, Robert Beatty, Kay Kendall	Thriller	
The Woman's Angle	Leslie Arliss	Edward Underdown, Cathy O'Donnell, Lois Maxwell	Drama	
Women of Twilight	Gordon Parry	René Ray, Lois Maxwell, Freda Jackson	Drama	
You're Only Young Twice	Terry Bishop	Duncan Macrae, Joseph Tomelty, Diane Hart	Comedy	

== See also ==
- 1952 in British music
- 1952 in British television
- 1952 in the United Kingdom
