= 1952 in film =

The year 1952 in film involved some significant events in cinema history, including the releases of Ivanhoe, Singin' in the Rain, and the Best Picture-winning The Greatest Show on Earth.

== Events ==
- January 10 – Cecil B. DeMille's circus epic, The Greatest Show on Earth, is premièred at Radio City Music Hall in New York City.
- March 27 – The MGM musical Singin' in the Rain premieres at Radio City Music Hall in New York City.
- May 26 – Decision reached in Joseph Burstyn, Inc. v. Wilson determining that certain provisions of the New York Education Law allowing a censor to forbid the commercial showing of any non-licensed motion picture film, or revoke or deny the license of a film deemed to be "sacrilegious," was a "restraint on freedom of speech" and thereby a violation of the First Amendment to the United States Constitution.
- September 19 – While Charlie Chaplin is at sea on his way to the United Kingdom, the United States Attorney-General, James P. McGranery, announces plans to review his right to return to the US.
- September 30 – The Cinerama multiple-projection widescreen system, invented by Fred Waller, makes its début in New York with the film This Is Cinerama.
- November 27 – Bwana Devil, the first American, feature-length, color 3-D film, is released, and begins the demand for 3-D films that lasts for the next two years.

== Top-grossing films ==
=== United States ===
The top ten 1952 released films by box office gross in the United States are as follows:

Highest-grossing films of 1952
Rank	Title	Distributor(s)	Domestic rentals
1	The Greatest Show on Earth	Paramount	$12,800,000
2	This Is Cinerama	Cinerama Releasing	$12,500,000
3	The Snows of Kilimanjaro	20th Century Fox	$6,500,000
4	Hans Christian Andersen	RKO	$6,000,000
5	Ivanhoe	MGM	$5,810,000
6	Sailor Beware	Paramount	$4,300,000
7	Moulin Rouge	United Artists	$4,252,000
8	Jumping Jacks	Paramount	$4,000,000
9	The Quiet Man	Republic	$3,800,000
10	High Noon	United Artists	$3,750,000

=== International ===
Country	Title	Director	Studio(s)	Gross	Ref
France	Little World of Don Camillo	Julien Duvivier	Cineriz, Francinex	12,791,168 admissions	
India	Aan	Mehboob Khan	Mehboob Productions	$5,880,000	(Note: ₹28 million ($5.88 million) (Note: 4.76 Indian rupees per US dollar from 1951 to 1965))
Italy	Little World of Don Camillo	Julien Duvivier	Cineriz, Francinex	13,215,653 admissions	
Japan	Himeyuri no Tō	Tadashi Imai	Toei Company	¥176,590,000	
Soviet Union	Tarzan the Ape Man	W. S. Van Dyke	Metro-Goldwyn-Mayer	42,900,000 admissions	
United Kingdom	The Greatest Show on Earth	Cecil B. DeMille	Paramount Pictures	13,000,000 admissions	

== Awards ==
Category/Organization	10th Golden Globe Awards February 26, 1953		25th Academy Awards March 19, 1953
Category/Organization	Drama	Comedy or Musical	25th Academy Awards March 19, 1953
Best Film	The Greatest Show on Earth	With a Song in My Heart	The Greatest Show on Earth
Best Director	Cecil B. DeMille; The Greatest Show on Earth		John Ford; The Quiet Man
Best Actor	Gary Cooper; High Noon	Donald O'Connor; Singin' in the Rain	Gary Cooper; High Noon
Best Actress	Shirley Booth; Come Back, Little Sheba	Susan Hayward; With a Song in My Heart	Shirley Booth; Come Back, Little Sheba
Best Supporting Actor	Millard Mitchell; My Six Convicts		Anthony Quinn; Viva Zapata!
Best Supporting Actress	Katy Jurado; High Noon		Gloria Grahame; The Bad and the Beautiful
Best Screenplay, Adapted	Michael Wilson; 5 Fingers		Charles Schnee; The Bad and the Beautiful
Best Screenplay, Original	Michael Wilson; 5 Fingers		T. E. B. Clarke; The Lavender Hill Mob

== Notable films released in 1952 ==
United States unless stated

=== # ===
- 1st of April, 2000 – (Austria)
- 5 Fingers, directed by Joseph L. Mankiewicz, starring James Mason

=== A ===
- Abbott and Costello Meet Captain Kidd, starring Bud Abbott and Lou Costello
- Above and Beyond, starring Robert Taylor and Eleanor Parker
- Affair in Trinidad, starring Rita Hayworth and Glenn Ford
- Against All Flags, starring Errol Flynn and Maureen O'Hara
- Alraune, starring Hildegard Knef and Erich von Stroheim – (West Germany)
- Andrine og Kjell – (Norway)
- Androcles and the Lion, starring Jean Simmons and Victor Mature
- Angel Face, starring Robert Mitchum and Jean Simmons
- Angels One Five, starring Jack Hawkins – (GB)
- Anhonee, starring Raj Kapoor and Nargis – (India)
- At Sword's Point, starring Maureen O'Hara and Cornel Wilde
- The Atomic City, starring Gene Barry and Lydia Clarke

=== B ===
- Babes in Bagdad, starring Paulette Goddard and Gypsy Rose Lee
- The Bad and the Beautiful, starring Lana Turner, Kirk Douglas, Walter Pidgeon, Dick Powell, Barry Sullivan, Gloria Grahame
- Baiju Bawra, starring Meena Kumari – (India)
- The Beast Must Die (La Bestia debe morir) – (Argentina)
- Because of You, starring Loretta Young
- Because You're Mine, starring Mario Lanza
- The Belle of New York, starring Fred Astaire and Vera-Ellen
- Les Belles de nuit (Beauties of the Night), directed by René Clair – (France)
- Belles on Their Toes, starring Myrna Loy, Jeanne Crain, Debra Paget
- Bend of the River, directed by Anthony Mann, starring James Stewart, Arthur Kennedy, Julie Adams, Rock Hudson
- Beware, My Lovely, starring Ida Lupino and Robert Ryan
- Big Jim McLain, starring John Wayne and James Arness
- The Big Sky, starring Kirk Douglas
- The Big Trees, starring Kirk Douglas
- The Black Castle, starring Stephen McNally, Boris Karloff, Lon Chaney Jr.
- Blackbeard the Pirate, starring Robert Newton
- Brandy for the Parson, starring James Donald and Kenneth More – (GB)
- Buffalo Bill in Tomahawk Territory, starring Clayton Moore
- The Bushwackers, starring John Ireland and Lawrence Tierney

=== C ===
- California Conquest, starring Cornel Wilde and Teresa Wright
- Captive Women, starring Robert Clarke
- Carbine Williams, starring James Stewart and Jean Hagen
- The Card, starring Alec Guinness, Glynis Johns, Petula Clark – (GB)
- Carrie, starring Laurence Olivier, Jennifer Jones, Miriam Hopkins
- Carson City, starring Randolph Scott
- Casque d'Or (Golden Helmet), directed by Jacques Becker, starring Simone Signoret – (France)
- Children of Hiroshima (Gembaku no ko) – (Japan)
- Ciguli Miguli – (Yugoslavia)
- The City Stands Trial (Processo alla città), directed by Luigi Zampa – (Italy)
- Clash by Night, directed by Fritz Lang, starring Barbara Stanwyck, Robert Ryan, Paul Douglas, Marilyn Monroe
- Come Back, Little Sheba, starring Burt Lancaster and Shirley Booth
- The Crimson Pirate, starring Burt Lancaster

=== D ===
- Dark River (Las aguas bajan turbias) – (Argentina)
- Deadline - U.S.A., directed by Richard Brooks, starring Humphrey Bogart, Ethel Barrymore, Kim Hunter, Jim Backus, Martin Gabel
- Denver and Rio Grande, starring Edmond O'Brien and Sterling Hayden
- Derby Day, starring Anna Neagle and Michael Wilding – (Britain)
- Desperate Search, starring Howard Keel and Jane Greer
- The Devil Makes Three, starring Gene Kelly
- Diplomatic Courier, directed by Henry Hathaway, starring Tyrone Power
- Don't Bother to Knock, starring Richard Widmark, Anne Bancroft, Marilyn Monroe
- Down Among the Z Men, starring The Goons – (GB)
- Dreamboat, starring Ginger Rogers, Clifton Webb, Elsa Lanchester, Anne Francis

=== E ===
- Emergency Call, directed by Lewis Gilbert, starring Jack Warner, Anthony Steel, Joy Shelton and Freddie Mills – (U.K.)
- Europa '51, directed by Roberto Rossellini, starring Ingrid Bergman – (Italy)
- The Eyes Leave Tracks (Los ojos dejan huella), starring Raf Vallone – (Spain)

=== F ===
- Face to Face, starring James Mason and Robert Preston
- Fanfan la Tulipe (a.k.a. Fearless Little Soldier), starring Gérard Philipe and Gina Lollobrigida – (France)
- Flaming Feather, starring Sterling Hayden
- Flavor of Green Tea Over Rice ( Ochazuke no aji), directed by Yasujirō Ozu – (Japan)
- Flesh and Fury, starring Tony Curtis and Jan Sterling
- Forbidden Games (Jeux interdits), directed by René Clément – winner of Oscar for best foreign language film – (France)

=== G ===
- A Girl in Every Port, starring Groucho Marx, William Bendix, Marie Wilson, Dee Hartford
- Gloria Mairena, directed by Luis Lucia, starring Juanita Reina, Eduardo Fajardo, Rafael Arcos (Spain)
- The Golden Coach (Le Carrosse d'or), directed by Jean Renoir, starring Anna Magnani – (France/Italy)
- The Greatest Show on Earth, directed by Cecil B. DeMille, starring Betty Hutton, Cornel Wilde, Charlton Heston, Gloria Grahame, Dorothy Lamour, James Stewart

=== H ===
- Hangman's Knot, starring Randolph Scott, Donna Reed, Lee Marvin
- Hans Christian Andersen, starring Danny Kaye and Farley Granger
- The Happy Family, directed by Muriel Box, starring Stanley Holloway and Kathleen Harrison – (GB)
- The Happy Time, starring Charles Boyer and Bobby Driscoll
- Has Anybody Seen My Gal, starring Piper Laurie, Rock Hudson, Charles Coburn
- Heidi, directed by Luigi Comencini – (Switzerland)
- Hellgate, starring Sterling Hayden
- Hiawatha, starring Vince Edwards
- High Noon, directed by Fred Zinnemann, starring Gary Cooper (Oscar for best actor) and Grace Kelly
- Los hijos de María Morales (The Children of Maria Morales), starring Pedro Infante – (Mexico)
- Holiday for Sinners, starring Gig Young and Janice Rule
- The Holly and the Ivy, starring Ralph Richardson and Celia Johnson – (GB)
- Home at Seven, directed by and starring Ralph Richardson – (GB)
- Horizons West, starring Robert Ryan, Rock Hudson, Raymond Burr
- Hunted, directed by Charles Crichton, starring Dirk Bogarde and Jon Whiteley – (GB)

=== I ===
- The I Don't Care Girl, starring Mitzi Gaynor and Oscar Levant
- I Dream of Jeanie, starring Bill Shirley
- Ikiru (To Live), directed by Akira Kurosawa, starring Takashi Shimura – winner of Golden Bear – (Japan)
- The Importance of Being Earnest, directed by Anthony Asquith, starring Michael Redgrave – (GB)
- Indian Uprising, starring George Montgomery
- It Grows on Trees, starring Irene Dunne
- Ivanhoe, starring Robert Taylor, Joan Fontaine, Elizabeth Taylor

=== J ===
- Jaal (Net), starring Dev Anand – (India)
- Jack and the Beanstalk, starring Bud Abbott and Lou Costello
- Japanese War Bride, starring Shirley Yamaguchi and Don Taylor
- The Jazz Singer, starring Danny Thomas and Peggy Lee
- Jolanda la figlia del corsaro nero (Jolanda, the Daughter of the Black Corsair) – (Italy)
- Jumping Jacks, starring Dean Martin and Jerry Lewis
- Just This Once, starring Janet Leigh, Peter Lawford

=== K ===
- Kangaroo, starring Maureen O'Hara, Peter Lawford
- Kansas City Confidential, starring John Payne and Coleen Gray
- Kid Monk Baroni, starring Leonard Nimoy

=== L ===
- Lady in the Iron Mask, starring Louis Hayward
- Lambert the Sheepish Lion
- The Last Page, a.k.a. Man Bait, starring George Brent, Marguerite Chapman, Diana Dors – (GB)
- The Life of Oharu (Saikaku ichidai onna), directed by Kenji Mizoguchi – (Japan)
- Lightning (Inazuma), directed by Mikio Naruse – (Japan)
- Limelight, directed by and starring Charlie Chaplin, with Claire Bloom
- Lola the Coalgirl, directed by Luis Lucia and starring Juanita Reina, Virgílio Teixeira (Spain)
- Lone Star, starring Clark Gable and Ava Gardner
- Lost in Alaska, starring Bud Abbott and Lou Costello
- Lovely to Look At, starring Kathryn Grayson, Howard Keel, Red Skelton
- Lure of the Wilderness, starring Jean Peters, Jeffrey Hunter, Walter Brennan
- The Lusty Men, starring Robert Mitchum

=== M ===
- Macao, starring Robert Mitchum and Jane Russell
- Mandy, starring Phyllis Calvert and Jack Hawkins – (GB)
- The Marrying Kind, starring Judy Holliday
- Meet Danny Wilson, starring Frank Sinatra
- The Member of the Wedding, starring Julie Harris
- The Merry Widow, starring Lana Turner
- Mexican Bus Ride (Subida al cielo), directed by Luis Buñuel – (Mexico)
- Million Dollar Mermaid, starring Esther Williams and Victor Mature
- The Miracle of Our Lady of Fatima, starring Gilbert Roland and Susan Whitney
- Les Misérables, starring Michael Rennie, Robert Newton, Debra Paget
- Monkey Business, starring Cary Grant, Ginger Rogers, Charles Coburn, Marilyn Monroe
- Monsoon, starring Diana Douglas and Ursula Thiess
- Montana Belle, starring Jane Russell
- Moulin Rouge, starring José Ferrer and Zsa Zsa Gabor – (GB)
- My Cousin Rachel, starring Olivia de Havilland and Richard Burton
- My Pal Gus, starring Richard Widmark and George Winslow
- My Six Convicts, starring Gilbert Roland
- My Son John, starring Robert Walker and Van Heflin

=== N ===
- The Narrow Margin, directed by Richard Fleischer, starring Charles McGraw
- Neighbours – (Canada)
- Never Look Back directed by Francis Searle, starring Rosamund John – (GB)
- No Room for the Groom, directed by Douglas Sirk, starring Tony Curtis and Piper Laurie

=== O ===
- O. Henry's Full House, an anthology film starring Charles Laughton, David Wayne, Marilyn Monroe, Richard Widmark, Anne Baxter, Jeanne Crain
- One Big Affair, starring Evelyn Keyes
- One Minute to Zero, directed by Tay Garnett, starring Robert Mitchum and Ann Blyth
- Othello (a.k.a. The Tragedy of Othello: The Moor of Venice), written, directed by and starring Orson Welles
- Outcast of the Islands, directed by Carol Reed, starring Ralph Richardson and Trevor Howard – (GB)
- The Overcoat (Il Cappotto) – (Italy)

=== P ===
- Pahit-Pahit Manis, starring Titien Sumarni and Chatir Harro (Indonesia)
- Panta Rhei, directed by Bert Haanstra
- Pat and Mike, starring Spencer Tracy and Katharine Hepburn
- Phone Call from a Stranger, starring Shelley Winters and Gary Merrill
- The Pickwick Papers, starring James Hayter and James Donald – (GB)
- Le Plaisir (a.k.a. House of Pleasure), directed by Max Ophüls, starring Claude Dauphin – (France)
- The Planter's Wife, directed by Ken Annakin, starring Claudette Colbert, Jack Hawkins & Anthony Steel – (GB)
- Pony Soldier, starring Tyrone Power
- The Pride of St. Louis, starring Dan Dailey
- The Prisoner of Zenda, starring Stewart Granger, Deborah Kerr, James Mason, Jane Greer

=== Q ===
- The Quiet Man, directed by John Ford, starring John Wayne and Maureen O'Hara

=== R ===
- Rancho Notorious, starring Marlene Dietrich
- Red Ball Express, starring Jeff Chandler
- Red Planet Mars, starring Peter Graves
- Retreat, Hell!, starring Frank Lovejoy
- Return of the Texan, starring Dale Robertson and Joanne Dru
- Reverón, directed by Margot Benacerraf
- Road to Bali, starring Bing Crosby and Bob Hope
- Rome 11:00 – (Italy)
- Room for One More, starring Cary Grant and Betsy Drake
- Ruby Gentry, starring Jennifer Jones, Charlton Heston and Karl Malden

=== S ===
- Sailor Beware, starring Dean Martin and Jerry Lewis
- Sangdil, starring Dilip Kumar and Madhubala – (India)
- Saturday Island, starring Linda Darnell and Tab Hunter – (GB)
- The Savage, starring Charlton Heston and Susan Morrow
- Scandal Sheet, starring Broderick Crawford and Donna Reed
- Scaramouche, starring Stewart Granger and Janet Leigh
- The Scarlet Flower (Alenkiy tsvetochek) – (U.S.S.R.)
- Sea Tiger, starring Marguerite Chapman
- Secrets of Women (Kvinnors väntan), directed by Ingmar Bergman, starring Eva Dahlbeck – (Sweden)
- Siempre tuya (Forever Yours) – (Mexico)
- Singin' in the Rain, starring Gene Kelly, Debbie Reynolds, Jean Hagen, Donald O'Connor
- The Sniper, directed by Edward Dmytryk
- The Snow Maiden (Snegurochka) – (U.S.S.R.)
- The Snows of Kilimanjaro, starring Gregory Peck and Ava Gardner
- Something Money Can't Buy, directed by Pat Jackson, starring Patricia Roc, Anthony Steel, Moira Lister & A.E. Matthews – (U.K.)
- Something to Live For, directed by George Stevens, starring Joan Fontaine and Teresa Wright
- Son of Paleface, directed by Frank Tashlin, starring Bob Hope, Jane Russell, Roy Rogers
- Song of the Sea (O canto do mar), directed by Alberto Cavalcanti – (Brazil)
- The Sound Barrier, directed by David Lean, starring Ralph Richardson – (GB)
- Springfield Rifle, starring Gary Cooper and Phyllis Thaxter
- The Star, starring Bette Davis and Sterling Hayden
- Stars and Stripes Forever, starring Clifton Webb, Debra Paget, Robert Wagner and Ruth Hussey
- Steel Town, starring Ann Sheridan and John Lund
- The Steel Trap, starring Joseph Cotten and Teresa Wright
- The Stooge, starring Dean Martin and Jerry Lewis
- Stop, You're Killing Me, starring Broderick Crawford and Claire Trevor
- The Story of Will Rogers, starring Will Rogers Jr. and Jane Wyman
- Sudden Fear, starring Joan Crawford, Jack Palance, Gloria Grahame

=== T ===
- The Hour of 13, starring Peter Lawford
- The Thief, starring Ray Milland
- This Is Cinerama, directed by Merian C. Cooper
- Thunderbirds, starring John Derek
- Tico-Tico no Fubá, directed by Adolfo Celi – (Brazil)
- Toto in Colour (Totò a colori), starring Totò – (Italy)
- Toxi, directed by Robert A. Stemmle (West Germany)
- Trent's Last Case, starring Orson Welles and Michael Wilding – (GB)
- The Turning Point, starring William Holden, Alexis Smith, Edmond O'Brien
- Two Cents Worth of Hope (Due soldi di speranza) – (Italy)

=== U ===
- Umberto D., directed by Vittorio De Sica – (Italy)
- Untamed Frontier, starring Joseph Cotten and Shelley Winters

=== V ===
- La villa Santo-Sospir, short film directed by Jean Cocteau – (France)
- Viva Zapata!, starring Marlon Brando and Jean Peters

=== W ===
- We're Not Married!, starring Ginger Rogers, Marilyn Monroe, Eve Arden, Paul Douglas, Eddie Bracken, Mitzi Gaynor
- The White Reindeer (Valkoinen peura) – (Finland)
- The White Sheik (Lo sceicco bianco), directed by Federico Fellini – (Italy)
- Who Goes There!, starring Nigel Patrick and Valerie Hobson – (GB)
- Wide Boy, starring Sydney Tafler and Susan Shaw – (GB)
- The Wild North, starring Stewart Granger and Cyd Charisse
- Wings of Danger, directed by Terence Fisher, starring Zachary Scott – (GB)
- The Witch (Noita palaa elämään) – (Finland)
- With a Song in My Heart, starring Susan Hayward
- A Woman Without Love (Una mujer sin amor), directed by Luis Buñuel – (Mexico)
- The World in His Arms, starring Gregory Peck, Anthony Quinn, Ann Blyth

=== Y ===
- You for Me, starring Peter Lawford, Jane Greer, Gig Young
- Young Man with Ideas, starring Glenn Ford and Ruth Roman

== Film releases ==
=== January–March ===
- February 7 – Viva Zapata!
- February 13 – Snow White and the Seven Dwarfs (re-release)
- February 19 – Retreat, Hell!
- February 22
  - 5 Fingers
  - One Big Affair

=== April–June ===
- April 4 – With a Song in My Heart
- May 2 – The Narrow Margin
- May 15 – Outcast of the Islands
- June 13 – No Room for the Groom
- June 26 – The Story of Robin Hood and His Merrie Men

=== July–September ===
- July 21 – One Minute to Zero
- July 23 – Untamed Frontier
- August 21 – The Quiet Man
- September 18 – O. Henry's Full House

=== October–December ===
- November 26 – Bwana Devil
- December 25
  - The Bad and the Beautiful
  - Come Back, Little Sheba

== Serials ==
- Blackhawk, starring Kirk Alyn
- King of the Congo, starring Buster Crabbe
- Radar Men from the Moon, starring George D. Wallace and Aline Towne
- Son of Geronimo starring Clayton Moore
- Zombies of the Stratosphere, starring Judd Holdren and Leonard Nimoy

== Short film series ==
- Mickey Mouse (1928–1953)
- Looney Tunes (1930–1969)
- Terrytoons (1930–1964)
- Merrie Melodies (1931–1969)
- Popeye (1933–1957)
- The Three Stooges (1934–1959)
- Donald Duck (1936–1956)
- Goofy (1939–1953)
- Tom and Jerry (1940–1958)
- Bugs Bunny (1940–1964)
- Mighty Mouse (1942–1955)
- Chip and Dale (1943–1956)
- Droopy (1943–1958)
- Yosemite Sam (1945–1963)

== Births ==
- January 1 - Stephanie Faracy, American actress
- January 2 - Wendy Phillips, American actress
- January 6
  - Armelia McQueen, American actress (died 2020)
  - Frank Sivero, Italian-American character actor
- January 11 – Bille Brown, Australian actor (died 2013)
- January 14 - Peter MacNeill, Canadian actor
- January 17 – Kevin Reynolds, American director and screenwriter
- January 18 – Michael Angelis, English actor (died 2020)
- January 22 – Ace Vergel, Filipino actor (died 2007)
- January 25 - Paul Calderón, Puerto Rican actor
- February 2 – Carol Ann Susi, American actress (died 2014)
- February 4
  - Lisa Eichhorn, American actress
  - Richard Lineback, American actor
- February 12 – Simon MacCorkindale, English actor (died 2010)
- February 14 – Anton Lesser, English actor
- February 17 - Garry Chalk, English-born Canadian actor
- February 19 - Steve James, American actor and stuntman (died 1993)
- February 22 – Issey Ogata, Japanese actor and comedian
- March 2 – Laraine Newman, American actress, voice actress, comedian and writer
- March 4 – Ronn Moss, American actor, musician and singer-songwriter
- March 6 – John David Carson, American actor (died 2009)
- March 11
  - James Fleet, English actor
  - Susan Richardson, American retired actress
- March 16 - Irwin Keyes, American actor and comedian (died 2015)
- March 19 – Harvey Weinstein, American producer
- March 24 – Nicholas Campbell, Canadian actor and filmmaker
- March 27 – Kalju Orro, Estonian actor
- April 1 – Annette O'Toole, American actress
- April 5 – Mitch Pileggi, American actor
- April 6 – Marilu Henner, American actress
- April 7
  - Dennis Hayden, American actor, producer and writer
  - Clarke Peters, American-British actor, writer and director
- April 8 – Andrew Stahl, American actor
- April 10
  - Robert Miranda, American actor
  - Steven Seagal, American actor & martial artist
- April 11 – Michael Thomas, British actor (died 2019)
- April 13 – Erick Avari, Indian-American actor
- April 15
  - Sam McMurray, American actor
  - Glenn Shadix, American actor (died 2010)
- April 16 – Billy West, American voice actor, musician, singer and songwriter
- April 17
  - Joe Alaskey, American stand-up comedian, actor, voice artist, and impressionist (died 2016)
  - Mattia Sbragia, Italian character actor
- April 19 - Tony Plana, Cuban-American actor and director
- April 26 – Spice Williams-Crosby, American actress
- April 28 – Mary McDonnell, American actress
- April 29 – Nora Dunn, American actress and comedian
- May 1
  - Margaret Michaels, former American actress
  - Pierre van Pletzen, South African actor, writer and director
- May 2
  - Christine Baranski, American actress
  - Thom Gossom Jr., American actor
- May 6
  - Gregg Henry, American actor & musician
  - Fred Newman, American actor and comedian
- May 9 – Patrick Ryecart, English actor
- May 11
  - Shohreh Aghdashloo, Iranian-American actress
  - Frances Fisher, British-born American actress
- May 14 – Robert Zemeckis, American director
- May 15 – Chazz Palminteri, American actor
- May 20 – Julia Deakin, English actress
- May 21 – Mr. T, American actor, bodyguard, television personality and retired professional wrestler
- May 22 – Mike Muscat, American actor
- May 28 – Denis Akiyama, Canadian actor (died 2018)
- May 31 – Carole Achache, French writer, photographer and actress (died 2016)
- June 4 – Kerry Shale, Canadian actor and writer
- June 5 – Connie Chiume, South African actress and filmmaker (died 2024)
- June 6 – Harvey Fierstein, American actor and screenwriter
- June 7 – Liam Neeson, Northern Irish actor
- June 18
  - Miriam Flynn, American voice actress and character actress
  - Carol Kane, American actress
  - Isabella Rossellini, Italian actress
- June 19 – Virginia Hey, Australian actress
- June 20
  - John Goodman, American actor
  - Larry Riley, American actor and musician (died 1992)
- June 22 – Graham Greene, Canadian actor (died 2025)
- June 26 – Peter Crombie, American actor (died 2024)
- June 30 – Patrick Pinney, American actor
- July 1
  - Dan Aykroyd, Canadian actor & comedian
  - Brian George, Israeli-English actor, voice artist, comedian and singer
- July 3
  - Rick Ducommun, Canadian stand-up comedian, actor, writer and producer (died 2015)
  - Cork Hubbert, American actor (d. 2003)
- July 6
  - Grant Goodeve, American actor
  - Dean Parisot, American director
- July 8 – Mary Ellen Trainor, American character actress (died 2015)
- July 11
  - Tim de Zarn, American actor
  - Stephen Lang, American actor
- July 13 – Rosemary Dunsmore, Canadian actress and director
- July 14
  - Stan Shaw, American actor
  - Joel Silver, American producer
- July 15
  - Celia Imrie, English actress
  - Terry O'Quinn, American actor
  - Judson Scott, American actor
- July 17 – David Hasselhoff, American actor, singer, producer and television personality
- July 20
  - Adrian Biddle, English cinematographer (died 2005)
  - Nathaniel Lees, New Zealand actor and director
- July 21 – George Wallace, American comedian and actor
- July 24 – Gus Van Sant, American director
- July 27 - Roxanne Hart, American actress
- July 29 - Wendy Hughes, Australian actress (died 2014)
- August 6 - Brian Levant, American filmmaker
- August 7 - Caroline Aaron, American actress
- August 10
  - Daniel Hugh Kelly, American actor
  - Diane Venora, American actress
- August 12 – Ronald Guttman, Belgian actor and producer
- August 16 – Reginald VelJohnson, American actor
- August 18 – Patrick Swayze, American actor & dancer (died 2009)
- August 19 – Jonathan Frakes, American actor & director
- August 26 – Michael Jeter, American actor (died 2003)
- August 27 – Paul Reubens, American actor, comedian, writer and producer (died 2023)
- September 1 – Michael Massee, American actor (died 2016)
- September 2 - Yuen Wah, Hong Kong actor, martial artist, stuntman and action choreographer
- September 4
  - Alan Blumenfeld, American character actor
  - Rishi Kapoor, Indian actor (died 2020)
- September 5 – Michael Horton, American actor
- September 6 – Vitali Baganov, Russian actor
- September 8 – David R. Ellis, American director and stunt performer (died 2013)
- September 9 – Angela Cartwright, British-American actress
- September 13 – Christine Estabrook, American actress
- September 16 – Mickey Rourke, American actor and screenwriter
- September 19 – Rein Aedma, Estonian actor
- September 24 – Christopher Reeve, American actor (died 2004)
- September 25 – Colin Friels, Scottish-born Australian actor
- September 26 – James Keane, American actor
- September 29 – Gábor Csupó, Hungarian animator, writer, director, producer, and graphic designer
- September 30
  - John Finn, American character actor
  - Al Leong, American stuntman and actor
  - Jack Wild, English actor and singer (died 2006)
- October 5 – Harold Faltermeyer, German musician and composer
- October 6 - Jim Downey, American writer, producer and actor
- October 7
  - Mary Badham, American actress
  - Tom McBride, American actor (died 1995)
- October 8 – Edward Zwick, American filmmaker
- October 13 – John Lone, Chinese-American actor
- October 14 – Rick Aviles, American stand-up comedian and actor (died 1995)
- October 22
  - Jeff Goldblum, American actor
  - John Howard, Australian actor
- October 23 - Robin Swicord, American screenwriter and director
- October 27 – Roberto Benigni, Italian actor
- October 28
  - Annie Potts, American actress
  - Jim Turner, American actor and stand-up comedian
- October 30
  - Emily Kuroda, American actress
  - Dalip Tahil, Indian actor
- November 2 – David Andrews, American character actor
- November 3
  - Roseanne Barr, American actress and stand-up comedian
  - Jim Cummings, American voice actor
- November 6 – Gary Goetzman, American producer and actor
- November 8 – Alfre Woodard, American actress
- November 9 – John Megna, American actor and director (died 1995)
- November 13 – Art Malik, Pakistani-born British actor
- November 14
  - Bill Farmer, American voice actor and comedian
  - Chris Noonan, Australian filmmaker and actor
  - Maggie Roswell, American actress, comedian, writer and producer
- November 15 – Randy Savage, American professional wrestler, commentator, actor and rapper (died 2011)
- November 18 – Delroy Lindo, British actor
- November 24 – Ulrich Seidl, Austrian director
- November 28
  - Rif Hutton, American actor (died 2026)
  - S. Epatha Merkerson, American actress
- November 29
  - Jeff Fahey, American actor
  - Tom Wright, American actor
- November 30
  - Mandy Patinkin, American actor
  - Henry Selick, American filmmaker and animator
- December 1 – Forry Smith, American actor
- December 2 – Keith Szarabajka, American actor
- December 3 – Mel Smith, English comedian, actor and director (died 2013)
- December 8 – Greg Collins, American character actor and former professional football linebacker
- December 9 – Michael Dorn, American actor
- December 12 – Sarah Douglas, English actress
- December 14 - John Lurie, American musician, actor, director and producer
- December 20 – Jenny Agutter, English actress
- December 21 – Dennis Boutsikaris, American character actor
- December 25 – CCH Pounder, Guayanese-born American actress
- December 29 – Külliki Saldre, Estonian actress

== Deaths ==
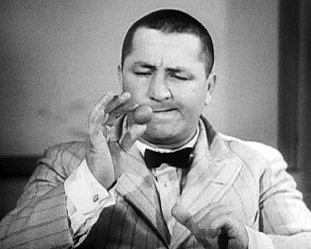
Curly Howard in Disorder in the Court.

- January 18 – Curly Howard, American comedian (b. 1903), The Three Stooges
- January 25 – Polly Moran, American actress (b. 1883), Chasing Rainbows, Adam's Rib
- March 1 – Gregory La Cava, American director (b. 1892), My Man Godfrey, Stage Door
- March 21 – Eddie Laughton, American actor (b. 1903), Girls of the Road, Atlantic Convoy
- March 26 – J. P. McGowan, Australian director (b. 1880), Where the West Begins, Tarzan and the Golden Lion
- April 21 – Leslie Banks, English actor (b. 1890), The Most Dangerous Game, Jamaica Inn
- May 8 – William Fox, American movie executive (b. 1879), 7th Heaven
- May 9 – Canada Lee, American actor (b. 1907), Lifeboat, Lost Boundaries, Cry, the Beloved Country
- May 21 – John Garfield, American actor (b. 1913), Body and Soul, Nobody Lives Forever, Gentleman's Agreement
- May 26 – Richard Rober, American actor (b. 1910), The Well, The File on Thelma Jordon
- June 27 – Elmo Lincoln, American actor (b. 1889), Tarzan of the Apes, The Adventures of Tarzan
- July 6 – Gertrud Wolle, German actress (b. 1891), The Hound of the Baskervilles
- August 2 – J. Farrell MacDonald, American actor (b. 1875), Me and My Gal, The Last Alarm
- August 18 – Ralph Byrd, American actor (b. 1909), Dick Tracy's Dilemma, The Vigilante
- August 28 – Lamar Trotti, American screenwriter (b. 1900), The Ox-Bow Incident, Cheaper by the Dozen
- September 7 – Gertrude Lawrence, English actress (b. 1898), Rembrandt, The Glass Menagerie
- October 11 – Jack Conway, American director (b. 1888), Boom Town, Libeled Lady, Viva Villa!
- October 17 – Julia Dean, American stage and screen actress (b. 1878), A Society Exile, The Curse of the Cat People
- October 20 – Basil Radford, English actor (b. 1887), Crook's Tour, The Galloping Major
- October 23 – Susan Peters, American actress (b. 1921), Song of Russia, Random Harvest
- October 26 – Hattie McDaniel, American actress (b. 1893), Gone with the Wind, Saratoga
- November 1 – Dixie Lee, American actress (b. 1912), Manhattan Love Song, Love in Bloom
- November 6 – George H. Reed, American actor, (b. 1866), Huckleberry Finn, Green Pastures
- December 4 – André Lefaur, French actor, (b. 1879), The Green Jacket, Adrienne Lecouvreur

== Film debuts ==
- Nick Adams – Somebody Loves Me
- Patrick Allen – Blackbeard the Pirate
- Jane Asher – Mandy
- Leon Askin – Assignment – Paris!
- Laurence Badie – Forbidden Games
- Anne Bancroft – Don't Bother to Knock
- Brigitte Bardot – Crazy for Love
- Rayford Barnes – Thunderbirds
- Geoffrey Bayldon – Trent's Last Case
- Erica Beer – Captive Soul
- Russ Bender – Paula
- Robert Burton – Fearless Fagan
- Peter Capell – Walk East on Beacon
- Geraldine Chaplin – Limelight
- Sydney Chaplin – Limelight
- Barrie Chase – Scaramouche
- Booth Colman – The Big Sky
- Chuck Connors – Pat and Mike
- Mike Connors – Sudden Fear
- Brigitte Fossey – Forbidden Games
- Michael Fox – Without Warning!
- Robert Fuller – Above and Beyond
- Zsa Zsa Gabor – Lovely to Look At
- Larry Gates – Glory Alley
- Raja Gosavi – Lakhachi Gosht
- George Hamilton – Lone Star
- Julie Harris – The Member of the Wedding
- Terence Hill – Vacation with a Gangster
- Earl Holliman – Pony Soldier
- Russell Johnson – For Men Only
- Carolyn Jones – The Turning Point
- Miriam Karlin – Down Among the Z Men
- Christine Kaufmann – The White Horse Inn
- Helen Kleeb – Kansas City Confidential
- Ettore Manni – Girls Marked Danger
- Eve McVeagh – High Noon
- Mort Mills – Affair in Trinidad
- Lee Montague – Moulin Rouge
- Alvy Moore – Okinawa
- Julie Newmar – She's Working Her Way Through College
- James O'Hara – The Quiet Man
- Raoul Retzer – Ideale Frau gesucht
- Christopher Rhodes – Moulin Rouge
- Henry Silva – Viva Zapata!
- Jill St. John – Thunder in the East
- Larri Thomas – Road to Bali
- Robert Urquhart – You're Only Young Twice
- Lee Van Cleef – High Noon
- Gregory Walcott – Red Skies of Montana
- Dennis Weaver – Horizons West
- Kenneth Williams – Trent's Last Case
