= List of Japanese films of 1952 =

A list of films released in Japan in 1952 (see 1952 in film).

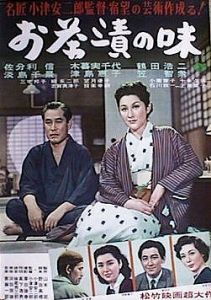
The Flavor of Green Tea over Rice

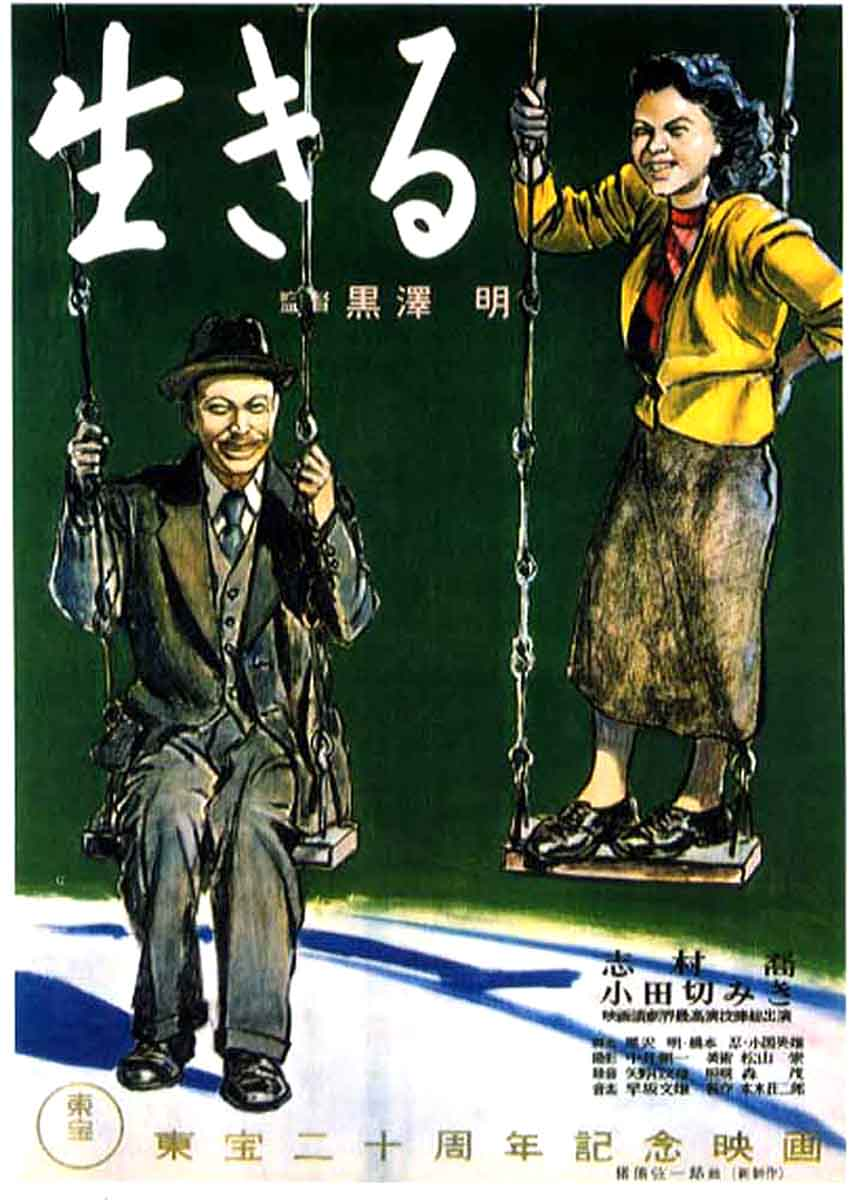
Ikiru

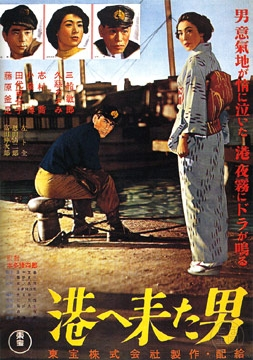
The Man Who Came to Port

Title	Director	Cast	Genre	Notes
Children of Hiroshima	Kaneto Shindō	Nobuko Otowa; Osamu Takizawa	Drama	
Dedication of the Great Buddha	Teinosuke Kinugasa	Kazuo Hasegawa; Machiko Kyō	Jidaigeki	Entered into the 1953 Cannes Film Festival
The Flavor of Green Tea over Rice	Yasujirō Ozu	Shin Saburi, Michiyo Kogure	Drama	
Foghorn	Senkichi Taniguchi	Yoshiko Yamaguchi; Toshirō Mifune		
Gendai-jin	Minoru Shibuya	Ryō Ikebe; Isuzu Yamada		Entered into the 1953 Cannes Film Festival
Ikiru	Akira Kurosawa	Takashi Shimura	Drama	Entered into the 4th Berlin International Film Festival, won Best Film at the 7th Mainichi Film Awards
Jewels in our Hearts	Yasuke Chiba			
The Life of Oharu	Kenji Mizoguchi	Kinuyo Tanaka	Drama	
Lightning	Mikio Naruse	Hideko Takamine		Won Best Film at the 3rd Blue Ribbon Awards
Love in a Teacup	Yasuke Chiba			
Man in the Storm	Kōzō Saeki	Kyōko Kagawa, Yaeko Mizutani, Yōichi Numata		Entered into the 1952 Cannes Film Festival
The Man Who Came to Port	Ishirō Honda	Toshirō Mifune; Asami Kuji		
Mother	Mikio Naruse	Kinuyo Tanaka; Kyōko Kagawa	Drama	
Sanman Ryo Gojusantsugi	Keigo Kimura	Denjirô Ôkôchi, Yukiko Todoroki, Keiko Orihara	Action Drama	
Swift Current	Senkichi Taniguchi	Toshirō Mifune; Asami Kuji		
Sword for Hire	Hiroshi Inagaki	Toshiro Mifune, Rentarō Mikuni, Danshiro Ichikawa	Jidai-geki	
Vendetta for a Samurai	Kazuo Mori	Takashi Shimura; Toshiro Mifune		

== See also ==
- 1952 in Japan
