= List of Soviet films of 1952 =

A list of films produced in the Soviet Union in 1952 (see 1952 in film).

== 1952 ==
Title	Russian title	Director	Cast	Genre	Notes
1952
The Composer Glinka	Композитор Глинка	Grigori Aleksandrov	Boris Smirnov	Biopic	
Dance Teacher	Учитель танцев	Tatyana Lukashevich	Vladimir Zeldin	Drama	
The Encounter of a Lifetime	Навстречу жизни	Nikolay Lebedev	Nadezhda Rumyantseva		
The Inspector-General	Ревизор	Vladimir Petrov	Igor Gorbachyov, Yuri Tolubeyev	Comedy	
May Nights	Майская ночь, или Утопленница	Aleksandr Rou	Nikolai Dosenko, Tatyana Konyukhova, Aleksandr Khvylya	Comedy	
Sadko	Садко	Aleksandr Ptushko	Sergei Stolyarov	Fantasy	
The Scarlet Flower	Аленький цветочек	Lev Atamanov	Mariya Babanova, Aleksey Batalov, Nikolay Bogolyubov, Vladimir Gribkov	Animation	
The Snow Maiden	Снегурочка	Ivan Ivanov-Vano		Animation	
The Unforgettable Year 1919	Незабываемый 1919-й	Mikheil Chiaureli	Mikheil Gelovani	Biopic	

== See also ==
- 1952 in the Soviet Union
