= Lagu Kenangan =

1953 film by L. Inata

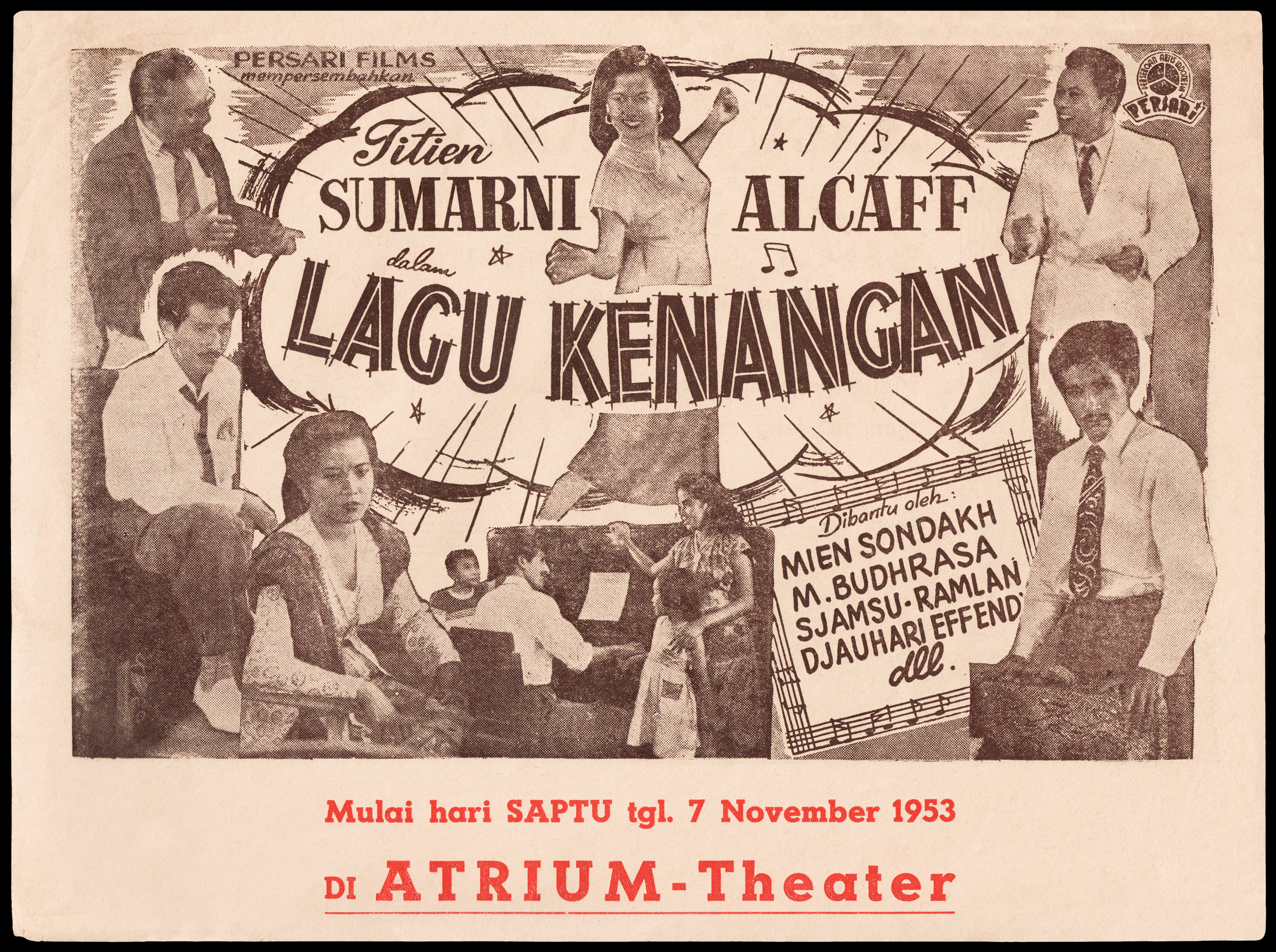
- Promotional flyer
- Directed by: L. Inata
- Written by: L. Inata
- Produced by: Djamaluddin Malik
- Starring: Titien Sumarni; A.N. Alcaff
- Production company: Persari Film Corporation
- Release date: 1953
- Country: Indonesia
- Language: Indonesia

Lagu Kenangan ('Song of Memories') is a 1953 Indonesian film directed by L. Inata and produced by Djamaluddin Malik for the Persari Film Corporation. Starring Titien Sumarni and A. N. Alcaff, it follows the domestic troubles of a composer and his wife.

== Plot ==
The composer Supardi lives with his wife, Surjati, and their two children Janti and Janto. The couple often fight, owing to Supardi's late hours, as he does his best work at night when the children are sleeping. Things escalate to the point that Surjati takes Janti and leaves. This separation nearly ends in divorce, but eventually with the support of their parents, Surjati and Supardi are able to reconcile.

== Production ==
Lagu Kenangan was produced for Persari Film Corporation by Djamaluddin Malik. The film was one in a long line of commercially oriented ventures which had been produced by the company starting with Sedap Malam in 1950. This black-and-white film was written and directed by L. Inata, who joined Persari shortly after completing Pahit-Pahit Manis for their competitor Banteng Film.

The film starred Titien Sumarni and AN Alcaff. They were supported by Mien Sondakh, M. Budhrasa, Sjamsu, Ramlan, and Djauhari Effendi.

== Release ==
Lagu Kenangan passed the censorship bureau in 1953, and was rated for viewers aged 13 and up. Screenings are reported as early as 14 August, at the Rivoli Theatre in Jakarta. The film had reached Malang, East Java, by 7 November 1953. For its run there at the Atrium Theater, it was advertised as a "charming, sad, funny and replete with melodious songs" ("menawan hati, sedih, lutju, dan diringi dengan njanjian^{2} jang merdu"). Lagu Kenangan was screened as late as August 1955.

== Works cited ==
- "Agenda "Semarang United Cinemas"". De Locomotief (in Dutch). Semarang. 13 August 1955. p. 3.
- Biran, Misbach Yusa, ed. (1979). Apa Siapa Orang Film Indonesia 1926–1978 [What and Who: Film Figures in Indonesia, 1926–1978]. Sinematek Indonesia. OCLC 6655859.
- Kristanto, JB, ed. (2007). Katalog Film Indonesia 1926– 2007. Jakarta: Nalar. ISBN 978-979-26-9006-4.
- Lagu Kenangan (brochure) (in Indonesian), Persari Film Corporation, 1953, reverse
- "Rivoli". De Nieuwsgier (in Dutch). Jakarta. 14 August 1953. p. 4.
