= 1952 in Japan =

- Decades: 1930s; 1940s; 1950s; 1960s; 1970s
- See also: Other events of 1952; History of Japan; Timeline; Years

Events in the year 1952 in Japan.

== Incumbents ==
- Emperor: Hirohito
- Prime Minister: Shigeru Yoshida
- Chief Cabinet Secretary:
  - Shigeru Hori (until October 30)
  - Taketora Ogata (starting October 30)
- Chief Justice of the Supreme Court: Kōtarō Tanaka
- Speaker of the House of Representatives:
  - Jōji Hayashi (until August 1)
  - Banboku Ōno (August 26 – August 28 and starting October 24)
- President of the House of Councillors: Naotake Satō

=== Governors ===
- Aichi Prefecture: Mikine Kuwahara
- Akita Prefecture: Tokuji Ikeda
- Aomori Prefecture: Bunji Tsushima
- Chiba Prefecture: Hitoshi Shibata
- Ehime Prefecture: Sadatake Hisamatsu
- Fukui Prefecture: Harukazu Obata
- Fukuoka Prefecture: Katsuji Sugimoto
- Fukushima Prefecture: Sakuma Ootake
- Gifu Prefecture: Kamon Muto
- Gunma Prefecture: Yoshio Iyoku (until 4 July); Shigeo Kitano (starting 5 August)
- Hiroshima Prefecture: Hiroo Ōhara
- Hokkaido Prefecture: Toshifumi Tanaka
- Hyogo Prefecture: Yukio Kishida
- Ibaraki Prefecture: Yoji Tomosue
- Ishikawa Prefecture: Wakio Shibano
- Iwate Prefecture: Kenkichi Kokubun
- Kagawa Prefecture: Masanori Kaneko
- Kagoshima Prefecture: Kaku Shigenari
- Kanagawa Prefecture: Iwataro Uchiyama
- Kochi Prefecture: Wakaji Kawamura
- Kumamoto Prefecture: Saburō Sakurai
- Kyoto Prefecture: Atsushi Kimura
- Mie Prefecture: Masaru Aoki
- Miyagi Prefecture: Kazuji Sasaki (until 4 October); Otogorō Miyagi (starting 5 October)
- Miyazaki Prefecture: Tadao Annaka
- Nagano Prefecture: Torao Hayashi
- Nagasaki Prefecture: Takejirō Nishioka
- Nara Prefecture: Ryozo Okuda
- Niigata Prefecture: Shohei Okada
- Oita Prefecture: Tokuju Hosoda
- Okayama Prefecture: Yukiharu Miki
- Osaka Prefecture: Bunzō Akama
- Saga Prefecture: Naotsugu Nabeshima
- Saitama Prefecture: Yuuichi Oosawa
- Shiga Prefecture: Iwakichi Hattori
- Shiname Prefecture: Yasuo Tsunematsu
- Shizuoka Prefecture: Toshio Saitō
- Tochigi Prefecture: Goro Abe
- Tokushima Prefecture: Kuniichi Abe
- Tokyo Prefecture: Seiichirō Yasui
- Tottori Prefecture: Aiji Nishio
- Toyama Prefecture: Kunitake Takatsuji
- Wakayama Prefecture: Shinji Ono
- Yamagata Prefecture: Michio Murayama
- Yamaguchi Prefecture: Tatsuo Tanaka
- Yamanashi Prefecture: Hisashi Amano

== Events ==
- March 4 – A Richer Scale magnitude 8.1 earthquake with tsunami hit off coast Tokachi region, Hokkaido, according to Japanese government official report, 33 persons were fatalities with 287 persons wounded.
- March 6 – The Musashino Bank (武蔵野銀行) was established in Saitama Prefecture.
- March 7 – A Richer Scale magnitude 6.5 earthquake hit off coast Ishikawa Prefecture, seven persons died, eight persons were hurt, according to Japanese government official report.
- April 10 – According to Japan Transport Ministry official confirmed report, Japan Airlines Flight 301 crash into Izu Ōshima, all 37 passengers and crew were killed.
- April 17 – According to Japan Fire and Disaster Management Agency official confirmed report, a massive fire in Tottori City, resulting to 160 hectares (395 acres), total 7,240 houses and building damage, kills two persons.
- April 28 – Treaty of San Francisco and 1952 U.S.-Japan security treaty goes into effect, ending the Allied occupation of Japan by the Supreme Commander for the Allied Powers.
- July 18 – A Richer Scale magnitude 7.0 earthquake hit in Takatori, Nara Prefecture, nine persons were fatalities, with 139 persons hurt, according to Japanese government official report.
- September 23 – According to Japan Coast Guard official confirmed report, a Kaiyō-maru five entrained by the eruption into Myōjin-shō, all 31 crew were human fatalities.
- October 1 – 1952 Japanese general election
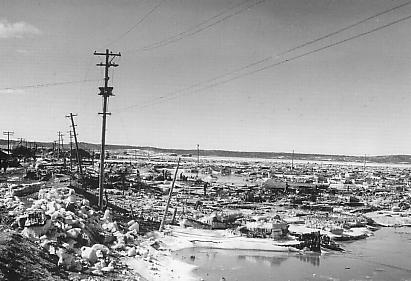
Tidal wave damage of the 1952 Tokachi earthquake on March 4.

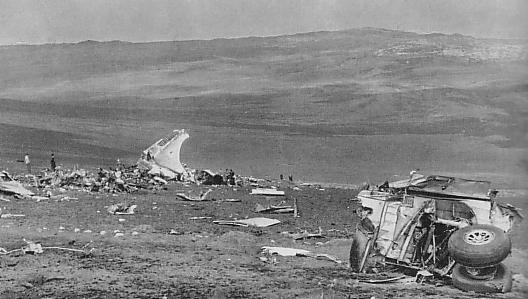
Aftermath of the crash Japan Airlines Flight 301 in Izu Oshima on April 10.

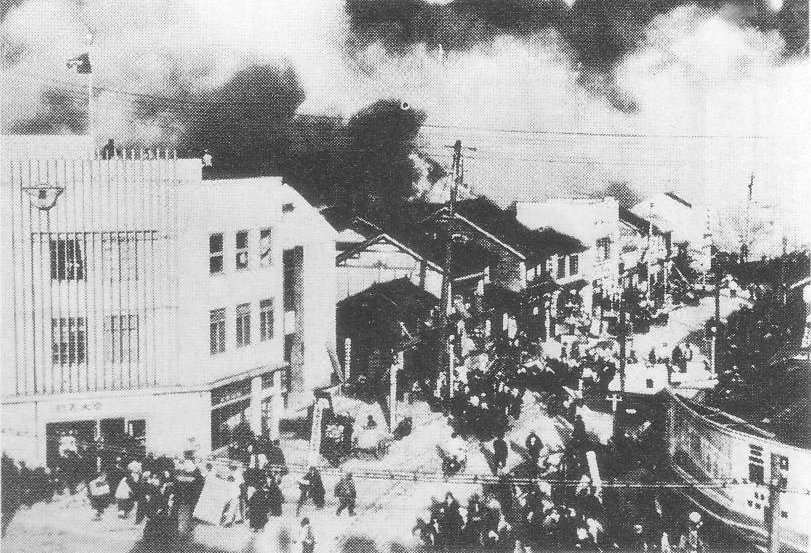
Houses and other buildings in the 1952 Tottori Fire on April 17.

== Films ==
- The Flavor of Green Tea over Rice

== Births ==
- January 2 – Makoto Nakajima, bureaucrat, Commissioner of Japan Patent Office
- January 17 – Ryuichi Sakamoto, musician, composer, producer, and actor (Yellow Magic Orchestra) (d. 2023)
- January 28 – Tomokazu Miura, actor
- February 2 – Ryuji Mizuno, voice actor (d. 2022)
- February 3 – Miyako Yamaguchi
- February 8 – Daisuke Gōri, voice actor (d. 2010)
- February 19 – Ryū Murakami, novelist, short story writer, essayist and filmmaker
- February 23 – Miyuki Nakajima, singer
- March 30 – Kazuyo Saeki, manga artist (d. 2021)
- April 10 – Masashi Sada, singer, lyricist, composer, novelist, actor, and a film producer
- May 2 – Mari Natsuki, singer, dancer and actress
- May 18 – Ryūzaburō Ōtomo, voice actor
- June 6 – Yukihiro Takahashi, musician and singer (Yellow Magic Orchestra) (d. 2023)
- June 20 – Kōichi Mashimo, anime director
- July 2 – Rumiko Koyanagi, actress and singer
- July 10 – Yōko Asagami, voice actress
- July 14 – Yutaka Mizutani, actor and singer
- July 15 – Yuriko Koike, politician, cabinet minister, and governor of Tokyo.
- July 20 – Keiko Matsuzaka, actress
- September 8 – Takaya Hashi, voice actor (d. 2025)
- November 16 – Shigeru Miyamoto, video game developer and designer
- December 6 – Shio Satō, manga artist (d. 2010)
- Shinichi Nishimiya, diplomat, designated Ambassador to China in 2012.

== Deaths ==
- April 21 – Isamu Yokoyama
- August 22 – Hiranuma Kiichirō
- October 7 – Keisuke Okada

== See also ==
- List of Japanese films of 1952
