= John Howell (art director) =

British art director (1914–1993)

- Born: 14 August 1914; Hampstead, England, United Kingdom
- Died: 16 January 1993 (aged 78); Budleigh Salterton, Devon, England, United Kingdom
- Occupation: Art director
- Years active: 1945–1974 (film)

John Howell (1914–1993) was a British art director who worked as production designer designing the sets for a number of films.

== Selected filmography ==
- Journey Together (1945)
- Fame Is the Spur (1947)
- Brighton Rock (1948)
- The Guinea Pig (1948)
- Private Angelo (1949)
- The Dancing Years (1950)
- Happy Go Lovely (1951)
- Saturday Island (1952)
- Treasure Hunt (1952)
- Malta Story (1953)
- The Net (1953)
- Forbidden Cargo (1954)
- Fast and Loose (1954)
- Simba (1955)
- Three Men in a Boat (1956)
- Loser Takes All (1956)
- The Baby and the Battleship (1956)
- Bhowani Junction (1956)
- Nor the Moon by Night (1958)
- Orders to Kill (1958)
- Swiss Family Robinson (1960)
- A Weekend with Lulu (1961)
- We Joined the Navy (1962)
- Guns of Darkness (1962)
- The Mouse on the Moon (1963)
- Man in the Middle (1964)
- A High Wind in Jamaica (1965)
- Khartoum (1966)
- Where the Spies Are (1966)
- The Deadly Affair (1967)
- Casino Royale (1967)
- Hammerhead (1968)
- Don't Raise the Bridge, Lower the River (1968)
- The Prime of Miss Jean Brodie (1969)
- There's a Girl in My Soup (1970)
- Soft Beds, Hard Battles (1974)

== Bibliography ==
- Holston, Kim R. Movie Roadshows: A History and Filmography of Reserved-Seat Limited Showings, 1911–1973. McFarland, 2012.
- Ryall, Tom. Anthony Asquith. Manchester University Press, 2005.
