= Distant Trumpet =

1952 British film by Terence Fisher

- Directed by: Terence Fisher
- Screenplay by: Derek Elphinstone
- Story by: Derek Elphinstone
- Produced by: Derek Elphinstone; Harold Richmond
- Starring: Derek Bond
- Cinematography: Gordon Lang
- Edited by: John Seabourne
- Music by: David Jenkins; Kenneth V. Jones (composer: additional music – uncredited)
- Production company: Meridian Films
- Distributed by: Apex Film Distributors (UK)
- Release date: July 1952 (UK)
- Running time: 63 minutes
- Country: United Kingdom
- Language: English

Distant Trumpet is a 1952 British second feature ('B') drama film directed by Terence Fisher and starring Derek Bond and Jean Patterson. It was written by Derek Elphinstone.

== Plot ==
A Harley Street doctor answers the call to perform medical missionary work in Africa, taking over from his indisposed brother.

== Cast ==
- Derek Bond as David Anthony
- Jean Patterson as Valerie Maitland
- Derek Elphinstone as Richard Anthony
- Anne Brooke as Beryl Jeffries
- Grace Gavin as Mrs. Phillips
- Jean Webster Brough as Mrs. Waterhouse
- Grace Denbeigh-Russell as Mrs Hallet
- Constance Fraser as Mrs Nettley
- Alban Blakelock as Mr Harris
- John Howlett as Bill Hepple
- Keith Pyott as Sir Rudolph Gettins
- Peter Fontaine as Peter
- Gwynne Whitby as Lady Marriot-Stokes
- Anne Hunter as 'simply dressed wWoman'

== Reception ==
The Monthly Film Bulletin wrote: "This film is decidedly amateurish in story, in treatment, and apart from Derek Bond, in acting."

Kine Weekly wrote: "Stiff-upper-lip romantic drama, with a clinical fringe. The picture is nearly all talk – a glimpse of Kensington Gardens and an African outpost are the only exteriors – but the dialogue is intelligent and the interplay of character neat. Derek Bond has an agreeable bedside manner as David; Derek Elphinstone convinces as the zealous Richard; and Jean Patterson looks attractive in white as Valerie. The supporting types are slightly overdrawn, but nevertheless provide effective, if occasionally unintentional, light relief."

Picture Show wrote: "It is rather slow moving but good performances are given by the leading players."

In British Sound Films: The Studio Years 1928–1959 David Quinlan rated the film as "mediocre", writing: "so poorly acted it loses one's interest."
