= Saturday Island =

1952 film by Stuart Heisler

- Theatrical release poster
- Directed by: Stuart Heisler
- Screenplay by: Stuart Heisler; Stephanie Nordli
- Story by: Stuart Heisler
- Based on: Saturday Island by Hugh Brook
- Produced by: David Rose
- Starring: Linda Darnell; Tab Hunter; Donald Gray
- Cinematography: Oswald Morris
- Edited by: Russell Lloyd
- Music by: William Alwyn
- Production company: Coronado Productions
- Distributed by: RKO Pictures; United Artists (US)
- Release date: 20 March 1952
- Running time: 94 minutes
- Country: United Kingdom
- Language: English
- Box office: $1.5 million (North America)

Saturday Island is a 1952 British south seas adventure romance film directed by Stuart Heisler and starring Linda Darnell, Tab Hunter, and Donald Gray. The film was produced by independent company Coronado Productions with the financial backing of RKO Pictures who distributed it in Britain. It was released in America by United Artists under the alternative title Island of Desire.

== Plot ==
When a hospital ship strikes a mine during the Second World War, the only survivors are Lieutenant Elizabeth Smythe and Corporal Michael Dugan, who become marooned on an island in the South Pacific, where they slowly bond. Their relationship is complicated by the arrival of a third person, a survivor of a plane crash.

== Cast ==
- Linda Darnell as Lieutenant Elizabeth Smythe
- Tab Hunter as Marine Corporal Michael J. 'Chicken' Dugan
- Donald Gray as Squadron Leader William Peck, RAF
- John Laurie as Grimshaw
- Sheila Chong as Tukua
- Russell Waters as Dr. Snyder
- MacDonald Parke as Ship's Captain
- Michael Newell as Edie
- Lloyd Lamble as Officer of the Watch
- Peter Butterworth as Wounded Marine
- Harold Ayer as Marine Sergeant
- Diana Decker as Nurse
- Hilda Fenemore as Nurse
- Joan Benham as Nurse
- Brenda Hogan as Nurse
- Katherine Blake as Nurse

== Production ==
The film was based on a novel by Hugh Brooke which was published in 1935. The New York Times called it "a delightful adventure". Variety called it "an amiably pleasant novel... Few are likely to remember It, but those who read It will enjoy It."

Film rights came into the hands of David E. Rose who set up the project in England under Warner Bros. Stuart Heisler signed to direct and Linda Darnell agreed to star, her first British film. Don Taylor was originally set to be Darnell's co star. Donald Gray signed to play the second male lead.

Location filming started in Jamaica on 1 July 1951.

The male lead eventually went to Tab Hunter. Hunter was recommended by Paul Guilfoyle a character actor who heard Heisler was looking for an unknown. Hunter went to see Heisler who asked the actor to take off his shirt. Hunter says screenwriter Stephanie Nordeli was enthusiastic about him. He tested on Saturday and by Monday was getting his passport to travel to Jamaica.

Interiors were shot at Walton Studios near London. The film's sets were designed by the art director John Howell.

== Reception ==
Variety said the film was "pooled in a leisurely and conventional style, making the production a fair hokum entertainment set for modest returns... Neither the incident nor the dialog is sufficiently sharp to maintain the grip on the first hour. There are one or .two minor, contrived thrills, but largely 'the conversation between the two characters during this period maintains a persistent level of puerility. There is more life and action in the later sequences, but it takes far too long for the picture to get moving." The critic felt Darnell "plods through the role in an uninspired way, registering the requisite emotions but offering only a modicum of conviction" while Hunter "displays a healthy torso, but not a great deal of talent."

== See also ==
- List of British films of 1952

== Bibliography ==
- Harper, Sue & Porter, Vincent. British Cinema of the 1950s: The Decline of Deference. Oxford University Press, 2007.
