= Titien Sumarni =

Indonesian actress, producer and businesswoman (19?–1966)

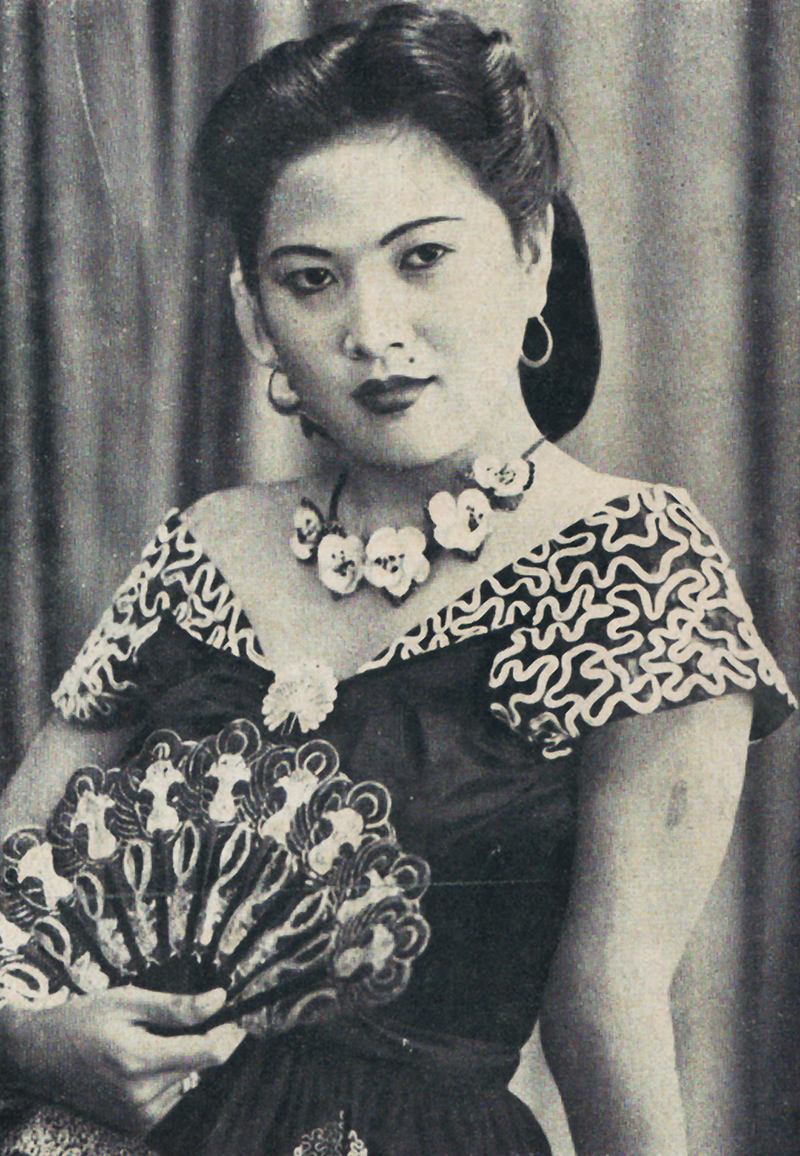
- Sumarni in 1954
- Born: Raden Ajeng Titien Sumarni; 28 December 19? (Note: Sumarni's year of birth is uncertain, as various sources claim 1927, 1928, 1930, 1932, and 1935.); Soerabaja, East Java, Dutch East Indies
- Died: 13 May 1966 (aged 30–38); Bandung, West Java, Indonesia
- Occupations: Actress; producer; businesswoman
- Years active: 1951–1956
- Spouses: Raden Mustari Natanegara (m. 1948; div. 1955) Laurens Saerang (m. 1957, divorced) Subjakto (divorced): Mohammad Jahja Ali
- Children: 5

Raden Ajeng Titien Sumarni (28 December 19? – 13 May 1966) was an Indonesian actress, producer and businesswoman. Active in the 1950s, she was often regarded as the most beautiful actress of her time and became the first Indonesian actress to establish a film company.

Born in Surabaya, Sumarni moved to Tasikmalaya as a child, where she developed an interest in stage acting. She trained under her uncle and future husband, Raden Mustari Natanegara, and later performed for republican troops during the Indonesian National Revolution. Sumarni began her film career in 1951, debuting in Seruni Laju. Over a five-year span, she appeared in thirty films, founded her own production company, and became one of the most popular Indonesian actresses of her time. After her final film, Sumarni gradually withdrew from the spotlight and eventually died in May 1966.

== Early life ==
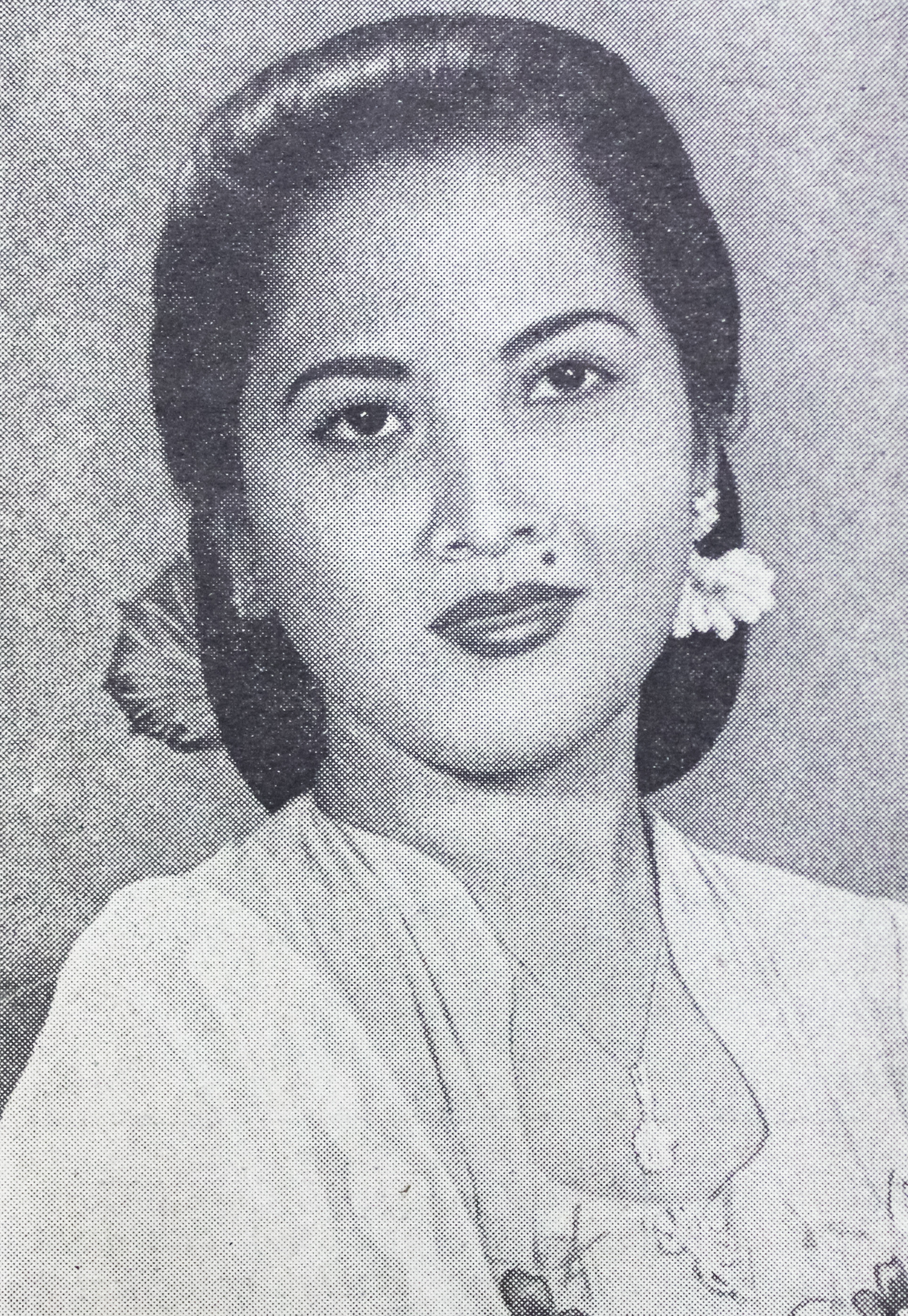
Sumarni in November 1953

Sumarni was born on 28 December 19? in Surabaya (then Soerabaja), East Java, as the only child and daughter of Memet Sukardi and RA Sarimanah. She was of mixed Javanese–Sundanese descent. Her father, an assistant wedana in Surabaya, died when she was three years old. To support their daily needs, Sumarni's mother started a hotel business. When Sumarni was six, she moved to her mother's hometown of Tasikmalaya, where she spent the rest of her childhood.

== Personal life ==
=== Marriages, relationships, and children ===
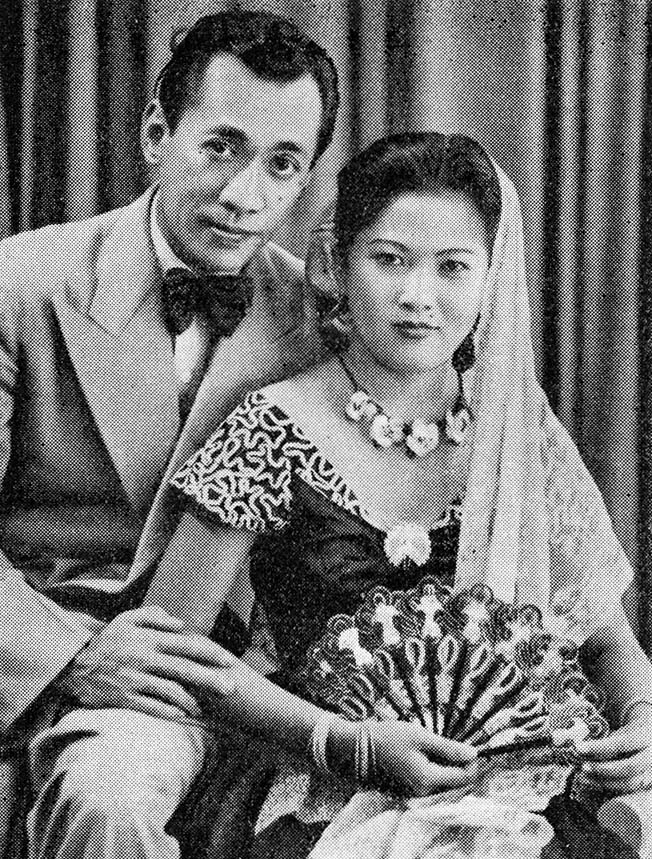
Sumarni with her first husband, Raden Mustari Natanegara

While attending junior high school in Bandung at the age of 15, Sumarni began studying acting under her uncle, Raden Mustari Natanegara, who was 16 years her senior. They married in 1948, reportedly as an act of revenge against her lover, an Indonesian military officer who had cheated on her with Natanegara's wife, according to author Rd. Lingga Wisjnu. After marriage, Sumarni left school and began a career as a stage actress, performing for troops during the Indonesian National Revolution until she eventually moved to Jakarta with her husband. The couple had a son, Tommy Sjarif Natanegara (born 1955), who became a singer under the stage name Tommy Soemarni & Co.

After gaining popularity, Sumarni divorced Natanegara and, in 1957, married Laurens Saerang, a wealthy entrepreneur from Minahasa Regency; however, this marriage also ended in divorce. She later married Subjakto, an entrepreneur from Jombang, but this marriage, too, ultimately ended in divorce.

Sumarni was reported to have had affairs with several men. Her relationship with Enoch Datubrata led to the birth of her son, Mochamad Jusuf Danubrata. She then had an affair with Entje Senu Abdul Rachman, which resulted in another son, Mochamad Patah Abdurachman. Sumarni also had a relationship with Sampetoding, which led to the birth of two sons, Mochamad Nur and Mochamad Rahmat Sampe.

In 1959, Sumarni began a relationship with Muhammad Jahja Ali, an entrepreneur from Bandung who had been a colleague of her father. They first met in 1939, when Ali was working at the Hollandsche Beton Maatschappij (HBM) in Surabaya. In 1945, Sumarni became friends with Ali's wife and often visited his home to see his sister-in-law, who was also her friend. After Sumarni married and moved to Jakarta, their meetings became infrequent. They reconnected in December 1958 at Persari Studio, where Ali was working on buildings owned by Djamaluddin Malik. The two eventually married but began feuding in August 1959.

Sumarni accused Ali of neglecting her during her pregnancy, even when she experienced bleeding that led to the loss of their baby; Ali reportedly never came to see her. Due to his actions, she demanded that Ali compensate her for losses amounting to Rp. 5 million. Ali, however, denied being the biological father of Sumarni's child, claiming he had last seen her in April 1959. He alleged that Sumarni was pregnant by her second husband and was filing for divorce in the Surabaya Religious Court.

Their dispute drew attention from the Marriage, Dispute, and Divorce Advisory Board in West Java, which stated that if marital problems made both parties unhappy, they were allowed to divorce amicably. Despite their feud, they eventually reconciled and remained married until Sumarni's death in May 1966.

=== Style ===
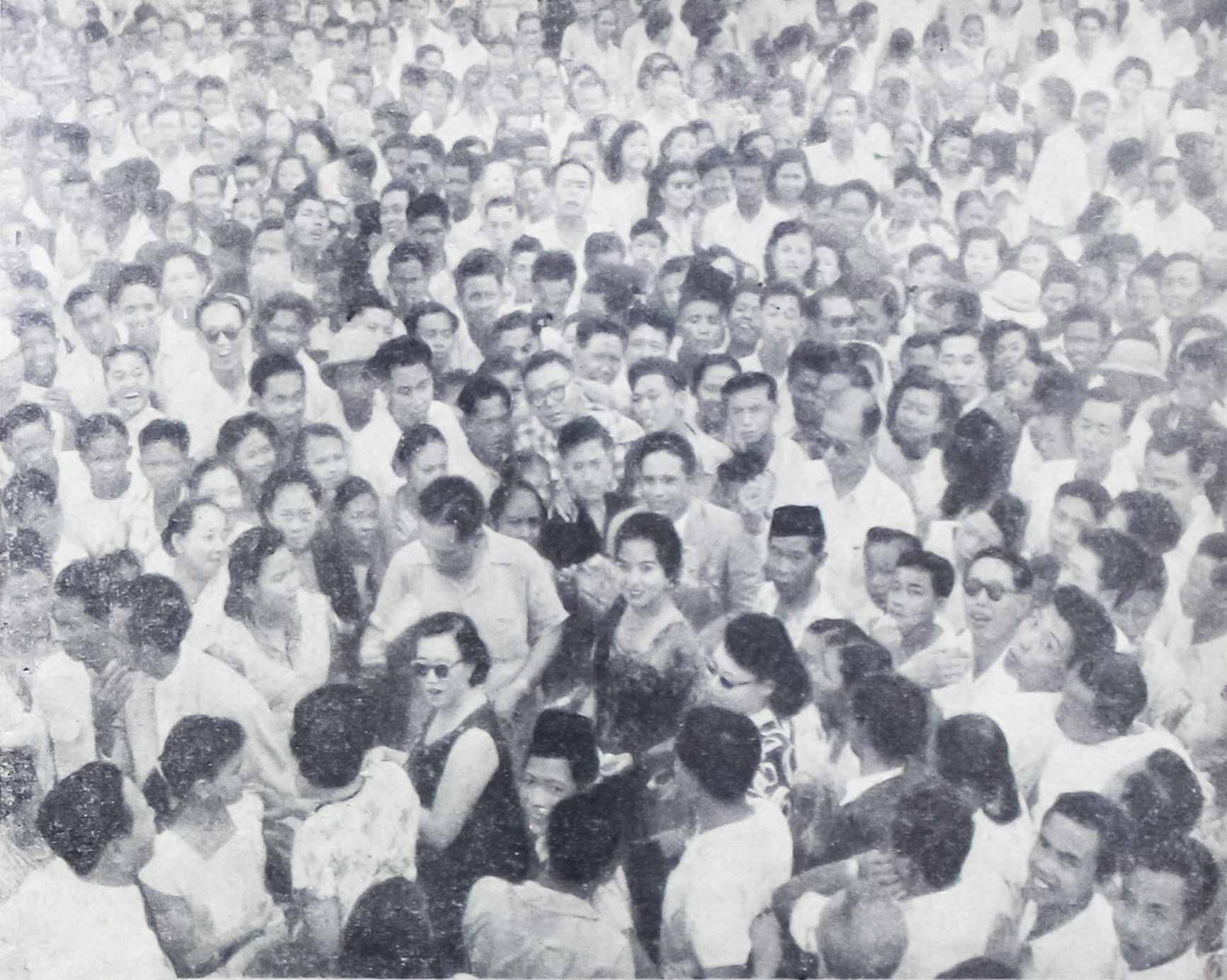
Sumarni surrounded by a crowd in January 1956

Sumarni was regarded as one of Indonesia's glamorous stars by Film Varia. Throughout her life, she owned two luxury cars.

=== Illness and death ===
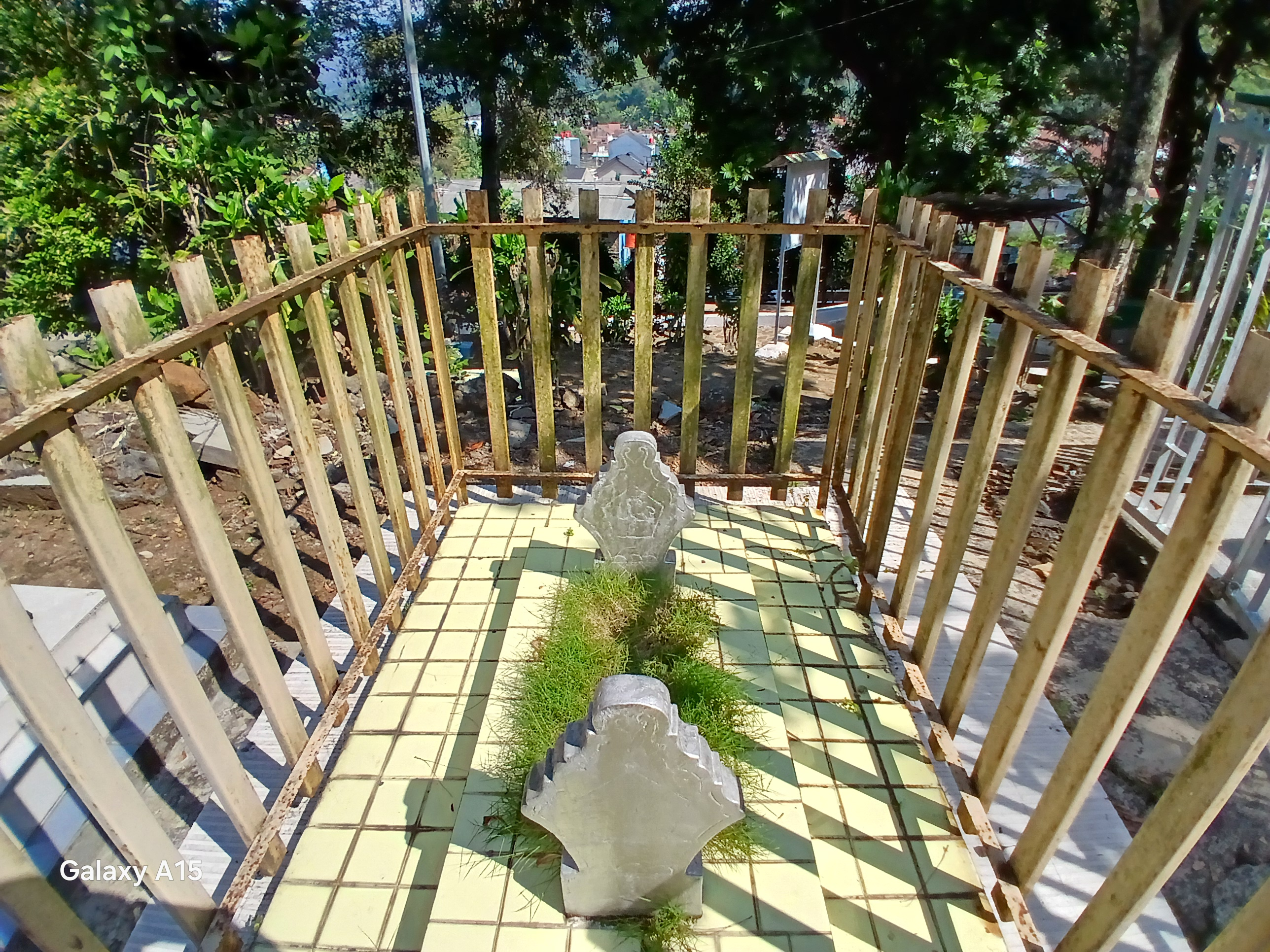
Sumarni's grave at the Gunung Puyuh Cemetery in Sumedang Regency

On 7 August 1959, Sumarni, reportedly in a state of depression, was seen walking barefoot through the streets of Bandung, causing a traffic jam. She walked seven kilometers wearing a pink shirt and black bottoms, followed by dozens of motorbikes and rickshaw pullers. In an interview, Sumarni later explained that she felt sad and confused, as she couldn’t remember where the Priangan residential police station was. A policeman eventually stopped her at an intersection, noticing her exhaustion, and took her to her family’s house in a truck.

Sumarni was said to be depressed over her failed attempt to sue her lover, Muhammad Jahja Ali, whom she claimed was the biological father of her child. On 8 August, she filed a report against Ali with the police.

After being found depressed and sick, Sumarni was cared for by a pedicab driver, who took her to a shaman named Mamah Atjeng for treatment. Sumarni then lived with Atjeng for two months. She was later discovered by journalist Hajat Tatos Kusuma, who took her to Bandung Adventist Hospital in Cipaganti, Coblong. At that time, she was living alone, had lost a considerable amount of weight, and was suffering from a lung infection.

After being treated for a week, Sumarni's health began to improve. However, she later received and ate black sticky rice from an anonymous person, which caused her health to deteriorate. The doctors planned to perform an operation on her, but Sumarni died on 13 May 1966 at 11:53 WIB (UTC+07:00), at the age of 38. Her doctor, Benjamin K. Supit, stated that she died from poisoning. On 13 June, Harian Selecta reported that Sumarni's death was due to complications from a long-standing illness, compounded by continuous bouts of diarrhea, which led to dehydration.

== Career ==
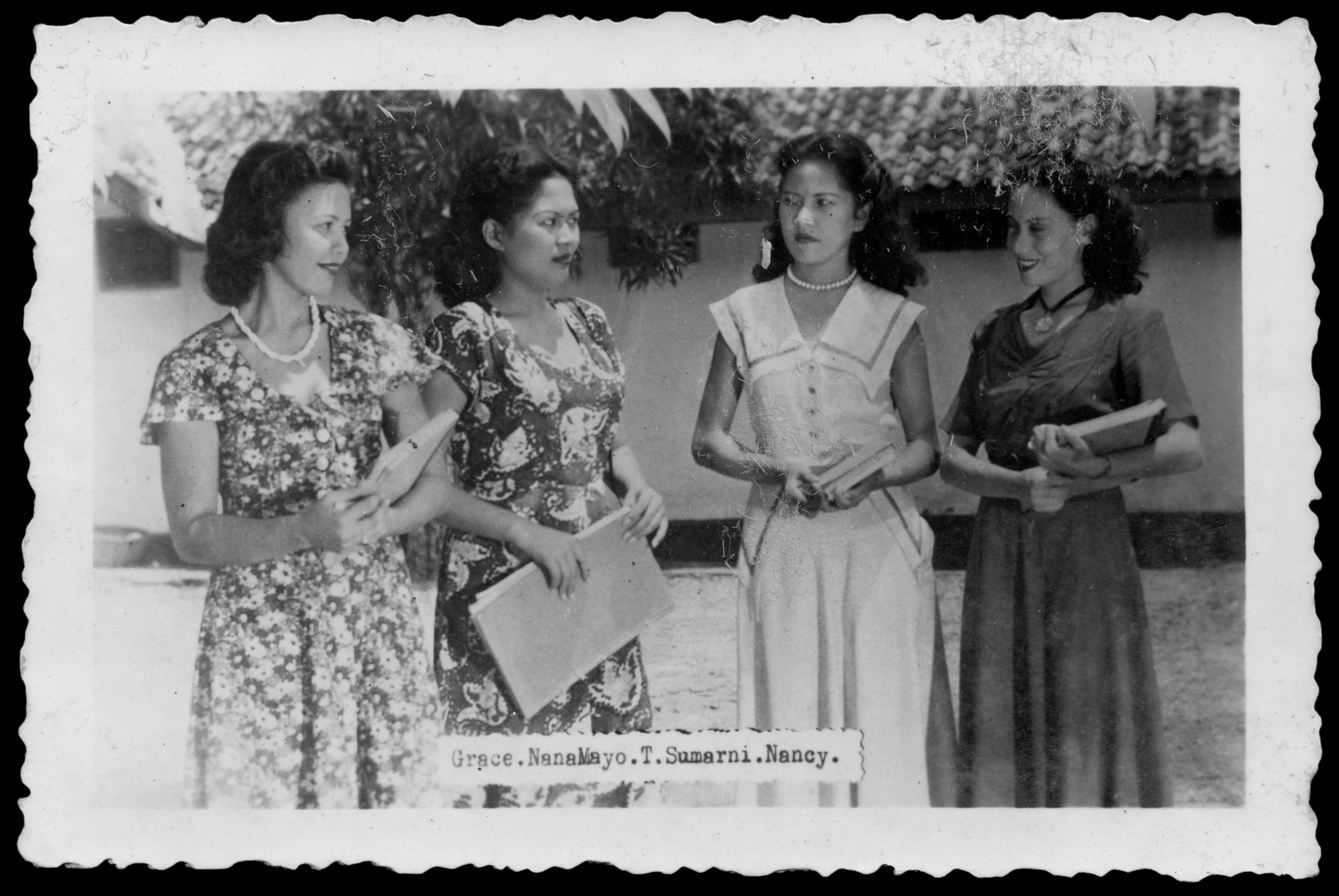
Sumarni (center right) in Kenangan Masa (1951)

Sumarni became interested in the Indonesian film industry in 1950 after seeing Nana Mayo in Inspektur Rachman. With her husband's permission, she entered the industry in 1951 through an acquaintance, Harun Al-Rasyid, an employee at the Golden Arrow Film Company. Al-Rasyid introduced her to director Rd Ariffien. Sumarni made her feature film debut in Golden Arrow's Seruni Laju, followed by roles in Kino Drama Atelier's Kenangan Masa and Gadis Olahraga (both 1951). However, due to overlapping production schedules, she encountered contract difficulties. In the same year, she was also featured in Life and Time magazines.

After the death of Dr. Huyung, the manager and director of Kino Drama Atelier, Sumarni was contracted by Djamaluddin Malik's Persari. However, she later moved to Fred Young's Bintang Surabaja after promoting cigarettes during an exhibition. Rumors surfaced in 1955 that her relationship with Persari had become strained, though she eventually reconciled with Malik.

In 1952, Sumarni starred in five films, including Si Mientje, Satria Desa, Terkabul, Pengorbanan, Pahit-Pahit Manis, and Apa Salahku, often being cast in romantic roles alongside S. Bono. Her performances attracted the attention of Malik, who cast her in Sepandjang Malioboro (1952).

Sumarni's first production with Bintang Surabaja was the musical comedy Putri Solo (1953), which became a major commercial success, breaking box-office records across the country. In this film, she portrayed Sulastri, a woman trapped in a love triangle with a man who already had a fiancée. That same year, Sumarni also starred in three more films: Asam Di Gunung Garam Di Laut, Gara-Gara Hadiah, and Lagu Kenangan. Her fan mail increased from 20 to 30 letters a day to several hundred. She was praised for her acting and sex appeal by film critics, who described her as an interesting figure in Indonesian cinema.

In her subsequent films, Sumarni was often cast as a flirtatious woman and frequently kissed her co-stars.

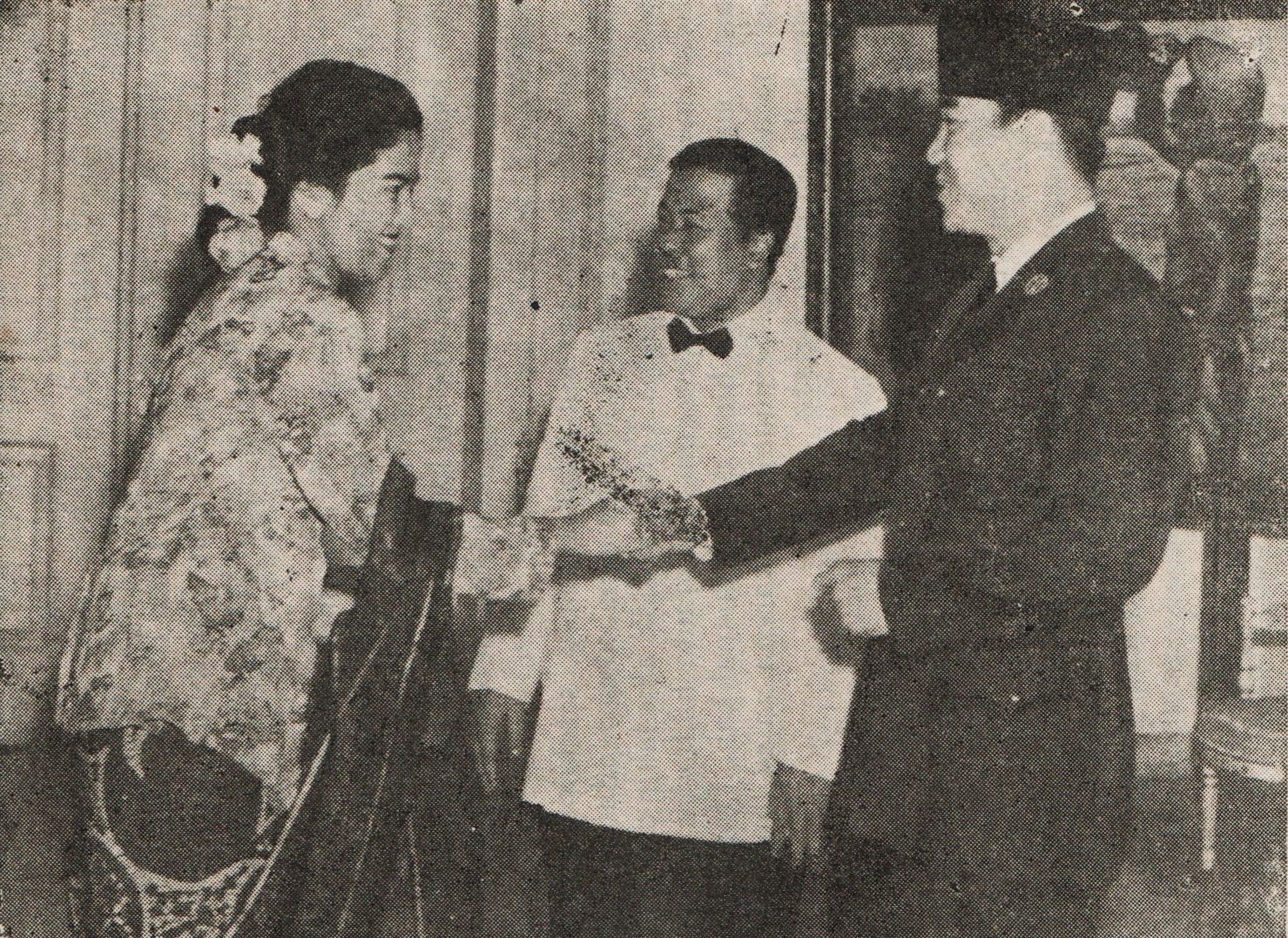
Titien Sumarni (left) with President Sukarno (right)

By 1954, Sumarni had become one of the most popular Indonesian actresses. She was widely recognized for the mole above her lip and was considered one of Indonesia's most beautiful actresses. Dunia Film described her as the Marilyn Monroe of Indonesia. Reportedly, President Sukarno's favorite actress, Sumarni was dubbed the "Queen of the Silver Screen" following a survey conducted by several magazines, including Kentjana and Dunia Film, in 1954. That year, she starred in nine films, including Lewat Djam Malam.

In 1954, Sumarni established her own film company, Titien Sumarni Motion Pictures, becoming the first Indonesian actress to do so. Rather than building her own studios, she utilized the facilities of Usmar Ismail's Perfini, paying nothing. The company considered the use of its studios as repayment for debts incurred from Mustari during the production of Krisis (1953). Titien Sumarni Motion Pictures produced five films. The first, Putri dari Medan, featured Sumarni as the titular woman from Medan.

During the shooting of this film, Sumarni made a statement expressing her approval of kissing scenes in films if required by the director or producer. In response, her husband issued a statement saying, "I don't mind my wife Titien Sumarni being kissed in every film scene if that's what the director or producer requires, but I think that, as an eastern nation with delicate sensibilities, kissing is unnecessary and could cause harm."

After giving birth to her first child, Sumarni took a hiatus from acting. However, her company continued to produce two films during this period: Mertua Sinting and Tengah Malam. Two final films, Sampah and Saidjah Putri Pantai, were released in 1955 and 1956, with Sumarni again in the lead roles. Her final film, Djandjiku, was made in 1956, produced by Djamaluddin Malik and G.H. Sawlani to compete with popular Indian films in Indonesia at the time.

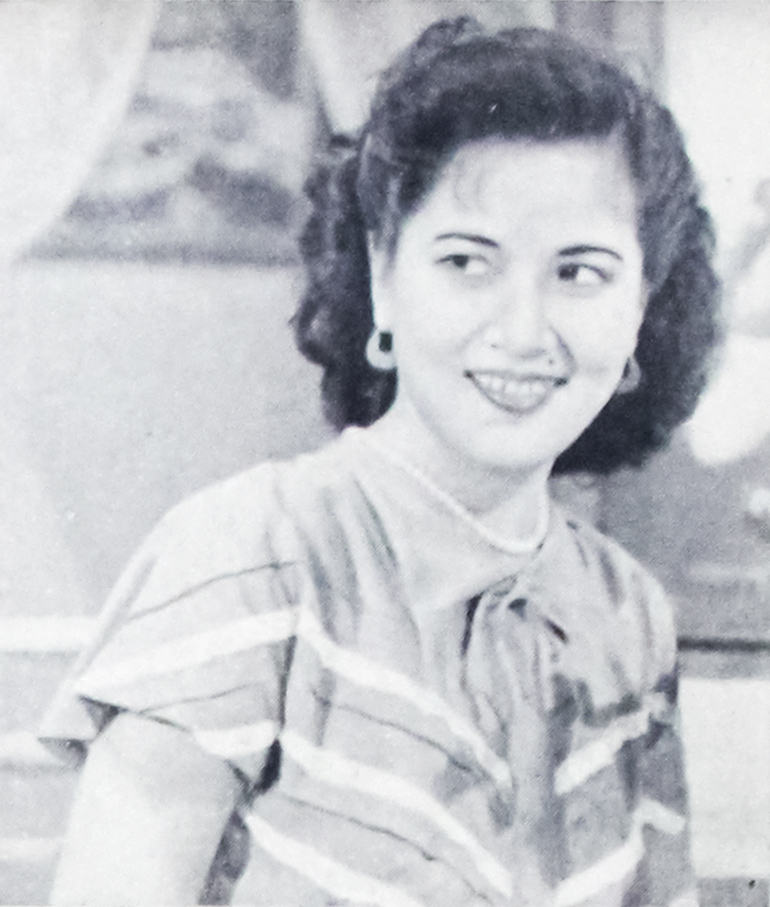
Sumarni in 1956

After retiring from the film industry, Sumarni became a businesswoman, investing her money in shares of a hotel and a batik business. She later stated that during her divorce from Mustari and her marriage to Subjakto, she relied solely on the income she earned from the film Djandjiku and did not have an additional wealth.

== Filmography ==
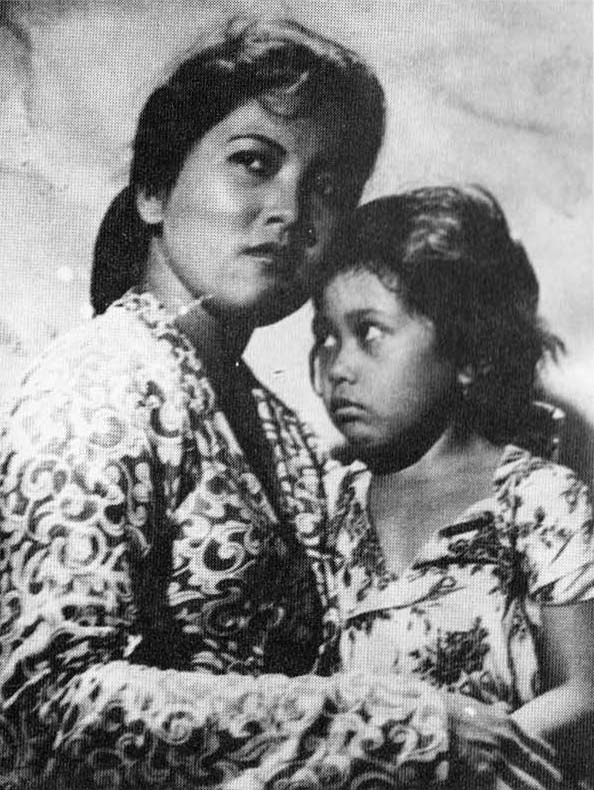
Sumarni and Henny Temple in Konde Tjioda (1954)

During her five-year career, Sumarni acted in thirty films. She also worked as a sound manager on one film and, through her company, Titien Sumarni Motion Pictures, produced five films.

=== Cast ===
- Seruni Laju (1951)
- Kenangan Masa (1951)
- Gadis Olahraga (1951)
- Main-Main Djadi Sungguhan (1951)
- Dunia Gila (1951)
- Sepandjang Malioboro (1951)
- Apa Salahku (1952)
- Pahit-Pahit Manis (1952)
- Pengorbanan (1952)
- Terkabul (1952)
- Satria Desa (1952)
- Si Mientje (1952)
- Ajah Kikir (1953)
- Asam Digunung Garam Dilaut (1953)
- Gara-gara Hadiah (1953)
- Putri Solo (1953)
- Lagu Kenangan (1953)
- Dewi dan Pemilihan Umum (1954)
- Antara Tugas dan Tjinta (1954)
- Kasih Sajang (1954)
- Klenting Kuning (1954)
- Konde Tjioda (1954)
- Lewat Djam Malam (1954)
- Perkasa Alam (1954)
- Putri dari Medan (1954)
- Sedarah Sedaging (1954)
- Senjum Derita (1955)
- Sampah (1955)
- Saidjah Putri Pantai (1956)
- Djandjiku (1956)

=== Crew ===
- Putri dari Medan (1954)
- Mertua Sinting (1954)
- Tengah Malam (1955)
- Putri Solo Kembali (1956)
- Sampah (1956)
- Saidjah Putri Pantai (1956)

== Works cited ==
- Apa Siapa Orang Film Indonesia [What and Who: Film Figures in Indonesia] (in Indonesian). Jakarta: Indonesian Ministry of Information. 1999. OCLC 44427179.
- Fadillah, Ramadhian (16 December 2015). "Artis Indonesia harus belajar dari legenda Titin Sumarni" [Indonesian Artists Must Learn from the Legend of Titien Sumarni] (in Indonesian). Merdeka.com. Archived from the original on 10 January 2016.
- Biran, Misbach Yusa, ed. (1979). Apa Siapa Orang Film Indonesia 1926–1978 [What and Who: Film Figures in Indonesia, 1926–1978]. Sinematek Indonesia. OCLC 6655859.
- "Filmografi Titien Sumarni" [Titien Sumarni Filmography]. filmindonesia.or.id (in Indonesian). Konfiden Foundation. Archived from the original on 6 March 2016.
- "Faktor^{2} Apa Menjebabkan "Titien Shake-Hand Persari"?" [What Factors led Titien to make a deal with Persari?]. Film Varia (in Indonesian). 2 (7): 11, 29. January 1956.
- "Prostitusi Artis, Belajarlah Dari Kisah Hidup Titin Sumarni" [Prostitution of Artists, Learn from the Life of Titien Sumarni] (in Indonesian). KapanLagi. 16 December 2015. Archived from the original on 19 January 2016.
- "Titien Sumarni Bersedia Ditjium" [Titien Sumarni Willing to be Kissed]. Dunia Film (in Indonesian). 3 (25): 16. 15 August 1954.
- Wisjnu, Rd. Lingga (1955). Rahasia Hidup R.A. Titin Sumarni [Life's Secret of R.A. Titien Sumarni] (in Indonesian). Jakarta: Analisa. OCLC 63866456.
- Femina (5 April 2000). "Dari Titien Soemarni hingga Suzzana". Femina. p. 3.
- Liberal (1957). "Tjerai Atas Kompromi". Liberal. p. 200.
- Kr, Hajat (15 May 1966). "Meninggalnya Titien Sumarni, Bukan Karena Sakit yang Diderita, Tinggalkan pesan Mengharukan". Minggu Pagi.
- Okezone (26 August 2022). "Kisah Titin Sumarni: Aktris Pujaan Bung Karno yang Terpuruk Akibat Skandal Seks : Okezone Celebrity". celebrity.okezone.com (in Indonesian).
- iNews.ID (10 September 2021). "Fakta-Fakta Titien Sumarni, Marilyn Monroe Indonesia Kisah Hidupnya Bikin Terhenyak". iNews.ID (in Indonesian).
- Film Varia (4 March 1954). "Djantung hati publik: Titien Sumarni". Film Varia (in Indonesian). pp. 12–13.
- Film Varia Nasional (6 May 1954). "Tahukah pembatja......? Bahwa". Film Varia (in Indonesian). p. 14.
- Aryono (29 March 2018a). "Marilyn Monroe Indonesia". Historia - Majalah Sejarah Populer Pertama di Indonesia (in Indonesian).
- Aryono (26 March 2018b). "Titin yang Genit". Historia (in Indonesian). Archived from the original on 11 July 2024.
