= Derek Elphinstone =

British actor (1913–1999)

Derek Elphinstone (1913–1999) was a British actor.

Derek Elphinstone was born on 15 October 1913 in Surrey. He was the son of actor Montague Elphinstone, from a family of actors. Montague Elphinstone served in the Boer War and the First World War, rising to the rank of Major. In 1912, Montague Elphinstone married Norah Hume, but died in a flying accident in 1917.

Derek Elphinstone died in February 1999 in East Sussex.

== Filmography ==
- The Four Feathers (1939) as Lieutenant Parker
- Sailors Three (1940) as British Observer
- In Which We Serve (1942) as No 1
- Distant Trumpet (1952) as Richard Anthony
- Secret People (1952) as Plain Clothes Man

== Television ==
- The Witness for the Prosecution (1949), as Sir Wilfrid Robarts in a BBC adaptation of Agatha Christie's play
