= Derek Bond =

British actor (1920–2006)

- Publicity still, 1947
- Born: Derek William Douglas Bond; 26 January 1920; Glasgow, Lanarkshire, Scotland
- Died: 15 October 2006 (aged 86); London, England
- Years active: 1938–1998
- Spouses: Ann Grace (m. 1942, divorced) (1 child) Gail Miller (m. 1970, divorced) (1 child) Annie Glover (m. 1977)

Derek William Douglas Bond MC (26 January 1920 – 15 October 2006) was a British actor. He was President of the trade union Equity from 1984 to 1986.

== Life and career ==
Bond was born on 26 January 1920 in Glasgow, Scotland. He attended Haberdashers' Aske's Boys' School in Hampstead, London.

Bond enlisted in the Coldstream Guards of the British Army soon after the outbreak of the Second World War, where his education marked him out for officer training, and he was duly sent to Sandhurst. As an officer cadet Bond trained alongside Patrick Leigh Fermor and Iain Moncreiffe. Opting to transfer to the Grenadier Guards, he was invited, with other hopefuls, to dinner by the Adjutant, Captain E.H. Goulburn. After being plied with drinks and subjected to a grilling, at which most of the cadets managed to maintain a suitable air of sycophancy, Bond was asked "So, Bond, you were an actor! Aren't all actors sh*ts?" After replying "No more than regular soldiers, sir!" – his future was assured. After the Dunkirk evacuation in May 1940, such was the apparent threat of invasion that the cadets were deployed in the defence of Camberley. However, with only one Bren gun between three hundred their effectiveness must have been limited. Finally, Bond was commissioned in July 1940. Serving with 3rd Grenadiers, Bond saw action in Tunisia and on 12 December 1942 was wounded in the leg by a machine-gun bullet. Evacuated home and awarded a Military Cross in February 1943, he dined with future prime minister Harold Macmillan, who had commanded the same platoon until he was wounded in the Great War. He was captured in Florence in the summer of 1944, and spent the last few months of the war in Stalag VII-A, a Bavarian POW camp.

He enjoyed a varied film, stage and television career, which began in 1938 with experience with the Finchley Amateur Dramatic Society. His conventional good looks secured him a number of dramatic and light comedy roles. He made a lasting impression in the title role of the Ealing Studios production of Nicholas Nickleby (1947).

As well as acting, he wrote a number of scripts; a stage play Akin to Death written in 1954, which he took on tour in 1955. On tour in Cardiff accidentally bumped into fellow POW from Stalag VII-A resulting in an impromptu reunion. His first drama for television was Unscheduled Stop, produced for ITV's Armchair Theatre in 1968 and directed by Toby Robertson. On the lyric stage he appeared in 1985 as Prince Leopold Maria in a production of Kálmán's The Gypsy Princess at Sadler's Wells Theatre.

He was president of the actors' union Equity for a tempestuous period during the 1980s. Because of his intention to perform in South Africa (the country's apartheid system was the cause of a UN-backed cultural boycott), a motion urging Bond to resign was proposed, but rejected, in July 1984. He resigned when a ban on members working in South Africa became union policy after his return to the UK.

Derek Bond was married three times. He died on 15 October 2006, at St George's Hospital in Tooting, London, and was survived by his third wife Annie, a son, a daughter and a stepson.

== Selected filmography ==
- The Captive Heart (1946) – Lt. Harley
- Nicholas Nickleby (1947) – Nicholas Nickleby
- The Loves of Joanna Godden (1947) – Martin Trevor
- Uncle Silas (1947) – Lord Richard Ilbury
- Broken Journey (1948) – Richard Faber
- The Weaker Sex (1948) – Lt. Comdr. Nigel Winan
- Scott of the Antarctic (1948) – Captain L.E.G. Oates
- Marry Me! (1949) – Andrew Scott
- Christopher Columbus (1949) – Diego de Arana
- Poet's Pub (1949) – Saturday Keith
- Tony Draws a Horse (1950) – Tim Shields
- The Quiet Woman (1951) – Duncan McLeod
- Distant Trumpet (1952) – David Anthony
- The Hour of 13 (1952) – Sir Christopher Lenhurst
- Love's a Luxury (1952) – Robert Bentley
- Trouble in Store (1953) – Gerald
- Stranger from Venus (1954) – Arthur Walker
- Tale of Three Women (1954) – Max (segment "Wedding Gift" story)
- Svengali (1954) – The Laird
- Three Cornered Fate (1955) – Robert Parker
- High Terrace (1956) – John Mansfield
- Rogue's Yarn (1957) – John Marsden
- Gideon's Day (1958) – Sgt. Kirby
- Stormy Crossing (1958) – Paul Seymour
- The Hand (1960) – Roberts / Roger Crawshaw
- Saturday Night Out (1964) – Paul
- Wonderful Life (1964) – Douglas Leslie
- Secrets of a Windmill Girl (1966) – Inspector Thomas
- Press for Time (1966) – Maj. R. E. Bartlett
- When Eight Bells Toll (1971) – Lord Charnley
- Intimate Reflections (1974) – Bank manager
- Hijack! (1975) – Power boat owner
- Visions (1998) – Shooter (final film role)

== Selected television appearances ==
- Picture Parade (co-presenter)
- Profile (co-presenter) (1958)
- Cooperama (with Tommy Cooper, 1966)
- Callan (1969)
- The Passenger (1971) - Colonel Reams - (two appearances in three-part thriller)
- Thriller (1974)
