= Treasure Hunt (1952 film) =

British comedy by John Paddy Carstairs

- Original trade ad
- Directed by: John Paddy Carstairs
- Written by: Rita Davison; Anatole de Grunwald
- Based on: Treasure Hunt by Molly Keane (writing as M.J. Farrell) and John Perry
- Produced by: Anatole de Grunwald
- Starring: Jimmy Edwards; Martita Hunt; Naunton Wayne; Athene Seyler
- Cinematography: C.M. Pennington-Richards
- Edited by: Ralph Kemplen
- Music by: Mischa Spoliansky
- Production companies: De Grunwald Productions; Romulus Films
- Distributed by: Independent Film Distributors
- Release date: 7 July 1952
- Running time: 79 minutes
- Country: United Kingdom
- Language: English

Treasure Hunt is a 1952 British comedy film directed by John Paddy Carstairs and starring Martita Hunt, Jimmy Edwards, Naunton Wayne and Athene Seyler. It was written by Rita Davison and Anatole de Grunwald based on the 1949 play Treasure Hunt by Molly Keane (writing as M.J. Farrell) and John Perry.

== Plot ==
On his death, the eccentric family of rakish Sir Roderick Lyall gathers at his ancestral Irish mansion, Ballyroden Hall, for the reading of the will. Everyone is shocked to hear that, once debts are paid, the only asset remaining will be the mansion. The family doctor, Mr. Walsh, suggests the mansion be turned into a guest house to bring in funds. Half the family supports the idea, but Uncle Hercules and Consuelo endeavour to sabotage the scheme. All the while, Aunt Anna Rose insists she has mislaid a fortune in jewels – but her story is doubted due to her eccentric personality. When the first paying guests, Eustace Mills, Mrs. Cleghorn-Thomas and daughter Yvonne, arrive for their holiday, expecting peace and quiet, they find themselves caught up in a series of farcical situations caused by their hosts.

== Cast ==
- Martita Hunt as Aunt Anna Rose
- Jimmy Edwards as Hercules Ryall / Sir Roderick Ryall
- Naunton Wayne as Eustace Mills
- Athene Seyler as Consuelo Howard
- June Clyde as Mrs. Cleghorn-Thomas
- Miles Malleson as Mr Walsh
- Susan Stephen as Mary O'Leary
- Brian Worth as Philip
- Mara Lane as Yvonne
- Maire O'Neill as Brigid
- Toke Townley as William Burke
- Bee Duffell as Mrs. Guidera
- Joseph Tomelty as poacher
- John McDarby as taxi driver
- Tony Quinn as Dan Brady
- Wilfred Caithness as doctor
- Hamlyn Benson as butler
- Irene Handl as nanny
- Shelagh Carty as 2nd nanny
- Kendrick Owen as stable boy
- Marguerite Brennan as pert little maid
- Diana Campbell as 2nd Maid
- John Kelly as bookmaker
- Kenneth Kove as clergyman
- Patrick O'Connor as telegraph boy
- James Page as racing enthusiast
- Roger Maxwell as military-looking man
- Nella Occleppo as schoolgirl
- Michael Ripper as removal man
- Fred Johnson as 2nd removal man
- Alfie Bass as tipster

== Production ==
The film was shot at Teddington Studios in London, which had been for many years the base of the British subsidiary of Warner Brothers. It was the last film to be shot there, before it was later taken over as a television production facility. The film's sets were designed by the art director John Howell.

== Critical reception ==
The Monthly Film Bulletin wrote: "This quite engaging and high-spirited comedy is a straightforward stage adaptation – and, as such, has far more movement and vitality than, say, Who Goes There! (1952). The characters are basically conventional stage Irish, but they have charm and humour. Martita Hunt's Anna Rose, indeed, is both a brilliant and touching creation. Athene Seyler is also a delicious Consuelo. The weakest point (apart from Brian Worth and Susan Stephen, who make a pallid but unimportant pair of young lovers) is Jimmy Edwards. In a rather unsatisfactory prologue he overplays badly, and throughout is inclined to force the pace. The photography, and John Howells elegant settings, are distinctly above average. Paddy Carstairs' direction is boisterous if slapdash, and Treasure Hunt as a whole seems a reasonable example of what unpretentious, unadventurous, small budget commercial films in this country ought to be; and so seldom are. It may not (apart from Martita Hunt) suggest a very inspiring average, but it does indicate a decent one."

Picturegoer wrote: "Jimmy Edwards has been taken by his handlebar moustache and dragged into every scene of Treasure Hunt, his new film, that could possibly accommodate him. His rasping voice blares like an off-key siren through the vocal haze of the picture's script. His bulky, make-up-aged figure brightens the comic qualities that remain from what was a funny original idea. ... But the fact remains that Treasure Hunt is first and last a photographed stage play, and never quite rids itself of the restrictions of a theatre stage. Consequently, the sequence of comedy situations, which was coherent and amusing when viewed over the footlights, lacks punch on the screen."

Britmovie called it a "Minor farce".

Sky Movies wrote, "Producer Anatole de Grunwald adapted the stage play by M J Farrell and John Perry in an enjoyably straightforward way. Director John Paddy Cartairs handles the film with appropriate vitality, making the most of the basically conventional stage Irish characters. Martita Hunt and Athene Seyler stand out in a large cast, among whom are such familiar faces as Miles Malleson, Alfie Bass and Hammer Films regular Michael Ripper."

In British Sound Films: The Studio Years 1928–1959 David Quinlan rated the film as "average", writing: "Cast play with spirit but on several different levels: farce varies between flat and fizzy"

Leslie Halliwell said: "Theatrical comedy with some charm and humour, but very much a photographed play."

The Radio Times Guide to Films gave the film 3/5 stars, writing: "Artist/novelist/screenwriter John Paddy Carstairs adapts MJ Farrell and John Perry's hit stage play, managing to capture much of the eccentric charm of the piece ... A first class cast is headed by Jimmy Edwards, here turning in another larger than life performance in a dual role."
