= Cipanas =

Cipanas may refer to:

- Cipanas, Cianjur, a town and district in Cianjur Regency
  - Cipanas, Cipanas, Cianjur, a village in Cianjur Regency
    - Cipanas Palace, a presidential palace of the Republic of Indonesia
- Cipanas, Lebak, a town and district in Lebak Regency
  - Cipanas, Cipanas, Lebak, a village in Lebak Regency
- Cipanas, Cipatujah, Tasikmalaya, a village in Tasikmalaya Regency
- Cipanas, Dukupuntang, Cirebon, a village in Cirebon Regency
- Cipanas, Tanjungkerta, Sumedang, a village in Sumedang Regency
