= 2024 Cianjur regency election =

Local election in Indonesia

- 27 November 2024
Regent before election
Herman Suherman
PDI-P
Elected Regent
TBD

The 2024 Cianjur regency election will be held on 27 November 2024 as part of nationwide local elections to elect the regent of Cianjur Regency for a five-year term. The previous election was held in 2020.

== Electoral system ==
The election, like other local elections in 2024, follow the first-past-the-post system where the candidate with the most votes wins the election, even if they do not win a majority. It is possible for a candidate to run uncontested, in which case the candidate is still required to win a majority of votes "against" an "empty box" option. Should the candidate fail to do so, the election will be repeated on a later date.

== Candidates ==
According to electoral regulations, in order to qualify for the election, candidates are required to secure support from a political party or a coalition of parties controlling 10 seats in the Cianjur Regional House of Representatives (DPRD). Golkar, which won 10 seats in the 2024 legislative election, is the only party eligible to nominate a candidate without forming a coalition with other parties. Candidates may alternatively demonstrate support in form of photocopies of identity cards, which in Cianjur's case corresponds to 119,118 copies. According to the General Elections Commission (KPU), two candidates expressed interest and consulted with KPU, but neither registered prior to the provided deadline.

The incumbent regent, Herman Suherman, has been elected to one full term (2021–2024) and served as a replacement regent for two and a half years prior (2018–2021). Following a 2023 ruling by the Constitutional Court of Indonesia, he was ineligible to run for a second full term.

=== Potential ===
The following are individuals who have either been publicly mentioned as a potential candidate by a political party in the DPRD, publicly declared their candidacy with press coverage, or considered as a potential candidate by media outlets:

- Tubagus Mulyana Syahrudin (Golkar), incumbent vice regent and chairman of Golkar's Cianjur branch.
- Muhammad Solih, personal secretary to Herman Suherman.
- Dany Gumilar, singer.

== Political map ==
Following the 2024 Indonesian legislative election, nine political parties are represented in the Cianjur DPRD:

Political parties	Seat count
Party of Functional Groups (Golkar)	10 / 50
Great Indonesia Movement Party (Gerindra)	7 / 50
Indonesian Democratic Party of Struggle (PDI-P)	6 / 50
NasDem Party	6 / 50
National Awakening Party (PKB)	6 / 50
Prosperous Justice Party (PKS)	5 / 50
Democratic Party (Demokrat)	5 / 50
National Mandate Party (PAN)	4 / 50
United Development Party (PPP)	1 / 50
