= Cipanas, Cipanas, Cianjur =

Cipanas
- Town
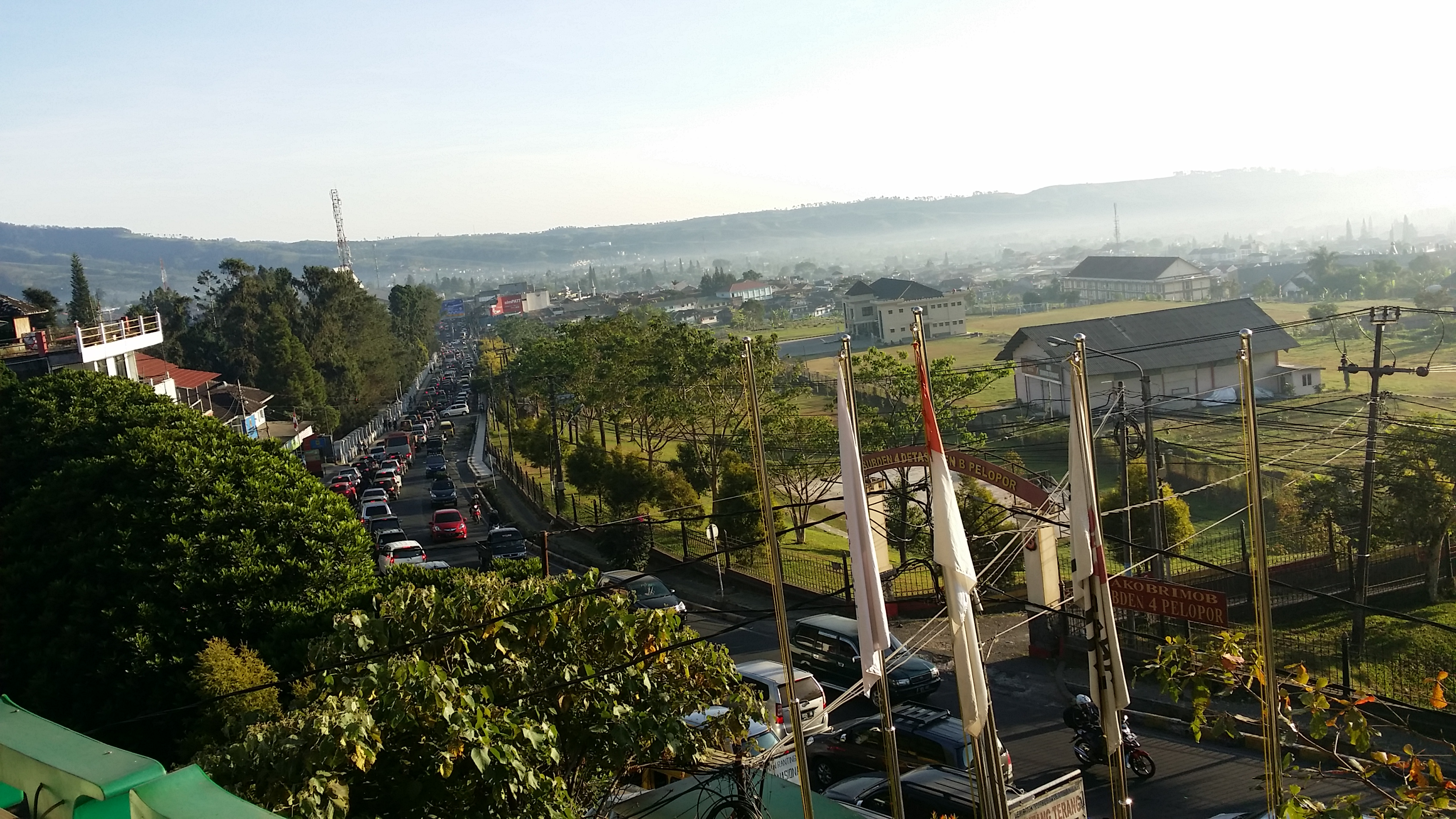

- Location in Java Location in Indonesia
- Coordinates: 6.733035°S 107.040966°E
- Country: Indonesia
- Province: West Java
- Regency: Cianjur Regency
- District: Cipanas
- Established: 1740

Area
  - Total: 58.03 ha (143.4 acres)
- Elevation: 1,080 m (3,540 ft)

Population (2010)
  - Total: 15,435
  - Density: 26,600/km^{2} (68,890/sq mi)
- Time zone: WIB (UTC+7)
- Postal code: 43253
- Area code: (+62) 255

Cipanas (Indonesian pronunciation: [tʃiˈpanas]) is a town in Cipanas district, in the northern part of the Cianjur Regency, West Java, Indonesia. It is situated in the valley of Mount Gede, 86 kilometres (53 mi) south-east of the Indonesian capital city of Jakarta. The name of the town means "hot water" or "hot spring" in Sundanese (ci, water; panas, hot), due to the presence of sulphuric hot springs in the area.

Apart from the hot springs, Cipanas was also a hill station for the then Dutch East Indies Governor-Generals, as it was a popular getaway from the intense heat and humidity from the low-lying lands area (including Jakarta). Maintaining its legacy to present day, Cipanas continues to become a popular destination for holiday seekers mainly coming from Jakarta and its surroundings, as the district saw a recent boom on villa complexes and rental houses.

The town had a population of 15,435 at the 2010 Census (the district held a population of 103,911). It is best known by the Cipanas Palace complex, a residence for former Dutch Governor Generals of the Dutch East Indies, and a country retreat of former president, Sukarno. Since the Dutch colonial rule, and before the Enhanced Indonesian Spelling System was established, the town name was spelled Tjipanas.

== History ==
The area already had a history of village dwellers since Sunda Kingdom and Banten Sultanate, long before the time the Presidential Palace was erected by a Dutch landlord named Van Heots in 1740. Out of interest in the local hot springs, during the administration of Dutch East India Company Governor General Gustaaf Willem van Imhoff (1743-1750), a health building was constructed near a hot spring. The reputation of the area for clean, fresh and cool mountain air led to the building being made into a resort for the Dutch Governor Generals.

From 1744 to 1761 a Buitenhospitaal (outdoor hospital or villa-hospital) existed in Cipanas. It was a kind of Spa that served as a health-resort. The wooden hospital was built on a hillside surrounded by woods and valleys. It was staffed by a chief surgeon (opper-chirurgijn) and a second in charge surgeon (onder-chirurgijn). The building had two floors, a covered walkway, a bathhouse and a pharmacy and was in demand by many sick people, or inmates of the hospital. However, to arrive in the mountains people took a difficult and strenuous journey of 4 days and the capacity of the hospital was too small to become a relief for patients. By Resolution of 30 June 1761, the resort-hospital was then closed.

The palace was used by Commissioner-General Leonard Pietr Josef du Bus de Gisignies, his secretary Carel Sirardus Willem Graaf van Hogendorp (1820-1841), Herman Willem Daendels (1808-1811) and Stamford Raffles, who would later become the founder of colonial Singapore. During their terms, they employed hundreds of workers in plantations around the palace.

== Climate and ecology ==
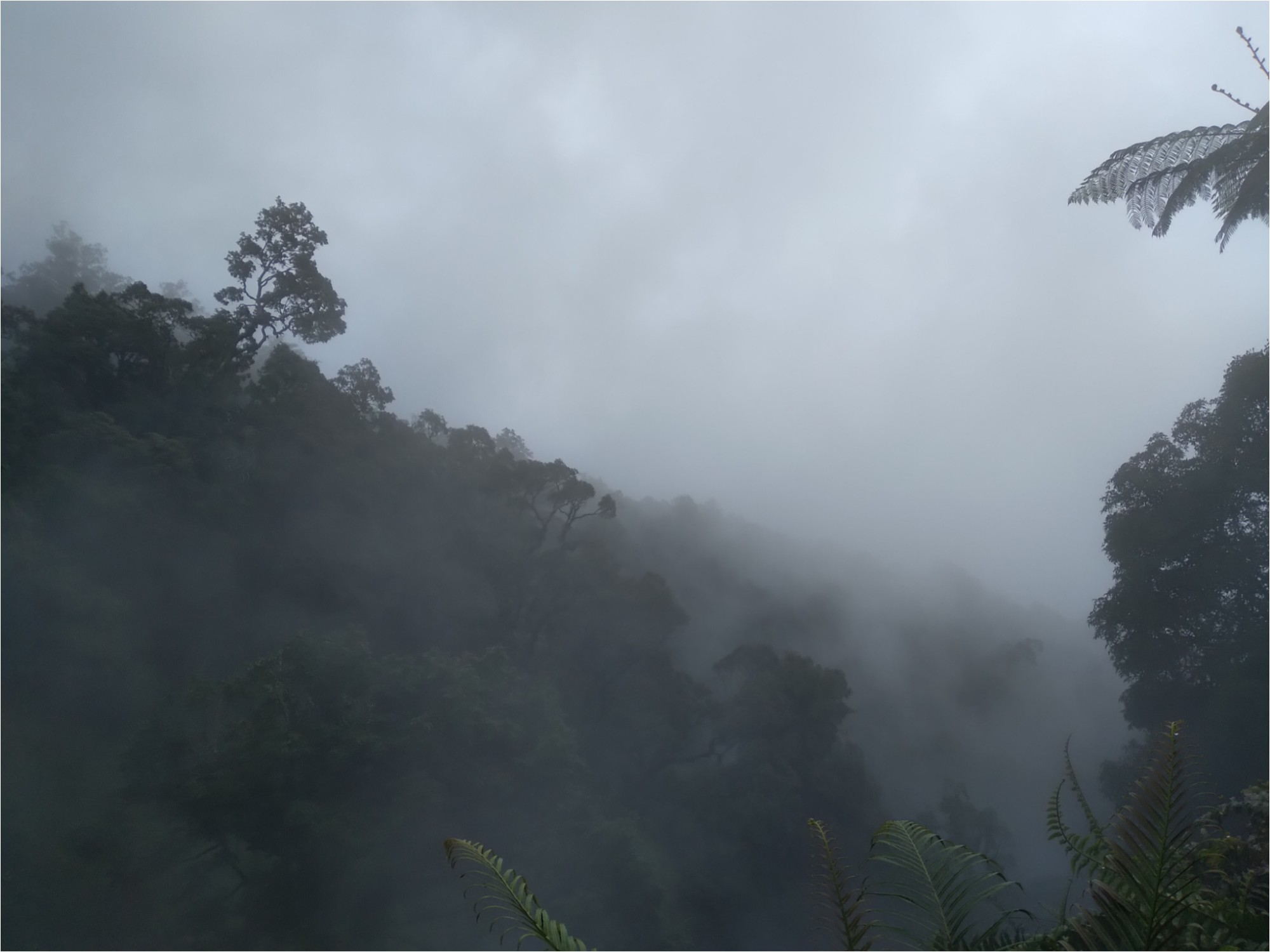
Montane rainforest in the foothills of Mt. Gede around Cipanas

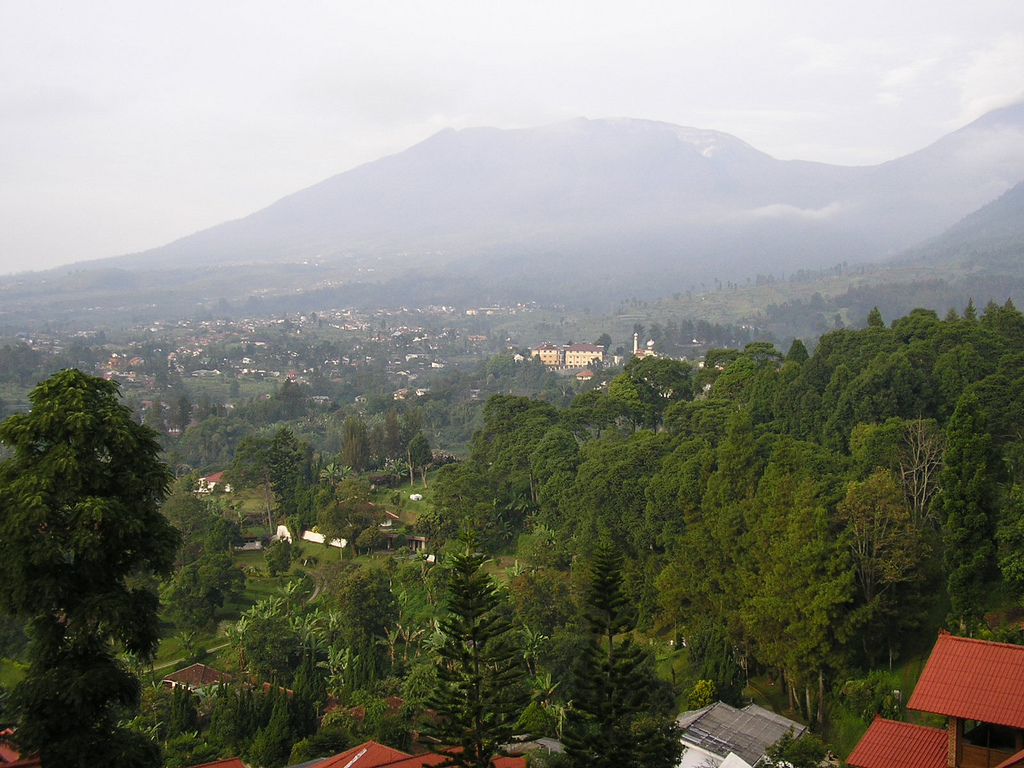
View of Cipanas (with Mount Gede in the background)

According to Köppen-Geiger climate classification, Cipanas has a tropical rainforest climate (Af), which borders with subtropical highland climate (Cfb), owing to its persistently high atmospheric humidity and annual rainfall of 2896 mm., in addition to its relatively high elevation. The average annual high temperature in Cipanas is around 75.4 °F (24.1 °C), while the annual low temperature is 62.2 °F (16.8 °C).

Locally present fauna include the silvery gibbon, Javan surili and Sunda thrush, and flora include Elaeocarpus macrocerus, Alstonia spatulata, Mangifera gedebe (a member of the mango family), Stemonurus secundiflorus, and Thoracostachyrum sumatrana (a large sedge).

The Taman Bunga Nusantara (Nusantara Flower Garden) within the area is a popular tourist attraction. The garden, extending over 23 hectares (0.23 km^{2}), hosts a wide variety of worldwide flora, and possesses a maze, giant clock and tower. Close to Cipanas, in Cibodas in the Pacet district, is the Kebun Raya Cibodas (Cibodas Botanical Garden), an extension of the Kebun Raya Bogor (Bogor Botanical Gardens) in Bogor.

Climate data for Cipanas, Cianjur, West Java, Indonesia (elevation 1,074 m or 3,524 ft)
Month	Jan	Feb	Mar	Apr	May	Jun	Jul	Aug	Sep	Oct	Nov	Dec	Year
Mean daily maximum °C (°F)	23.2 (73.8)	23.2 (73.8)	23.8 (74.8)	24.1 (75.4)	24.1 (75.4)	23.9 (75.0)	24.1 (75.4)	24.7 (76.5)	25.3 (77.5)	24.9 (76.8)	24.2 (75.6)	23.6 (74.5)	24.1 (75.4)
Daily mean °C (°F)	19.5 (67.1)	19.5 (67.1)	19.7 (67.5)	19.9 (67.8)	20.1 (68.2)	19.8 (67.6)	19.7 (67.5)	20.0 (68.0)	20.3 (68.5)	20.2 (68.4)	20.0 (68.0)	19.8 (67.6)	19.9 (67.8)
Mean daily minimum °C (°F)	17.1 (62.8)	17.1 (62.8)	17.0 (62.6)	17.1 (62.8)	17.0 (62.6)	16.4 (61.5)	15.9 (60.6)	16.1 (61.0)	16.4 (61.5)	16.9 (62.4)	17.3 (63.1)	17.2 (63.0)	16.8 (62.2)
Average precipitation mm (inches)	342 (13.5)	327 (12.9)	334 (13.1)	289 (11.4)	164 (6.5)	111 (4.4)	94 (3.7)	97 (3.8)	129 (5.1)	270 (10.6)	376 (14.8)	363 (14.3)	2,896 (114.1)
Average relative humidity (%)	88	89	88	87	86	82	77	73	72	77	85	87	83
Mean daily sunshine hours	6.6	6.3	7.0	6.9	7.2	7.6	7.8	8.1	8.4	8.0	7.4	7.3	7.4
Source: https://en.climate-data.org/asia/indonesia/west-java/cipanas-601231/#climate-table

== Demographics ==
The ethnic makeup of Cipanas is mostly Sundanese people. The majority of the residents are Muslim, with the total Muslim population as of 2013 being 99,657 (93.8%), Catholic Christians 881 (0.83%), Protestant Christians 603 (0.567%) and others 5,117 (4.8%).

== Gallery ==
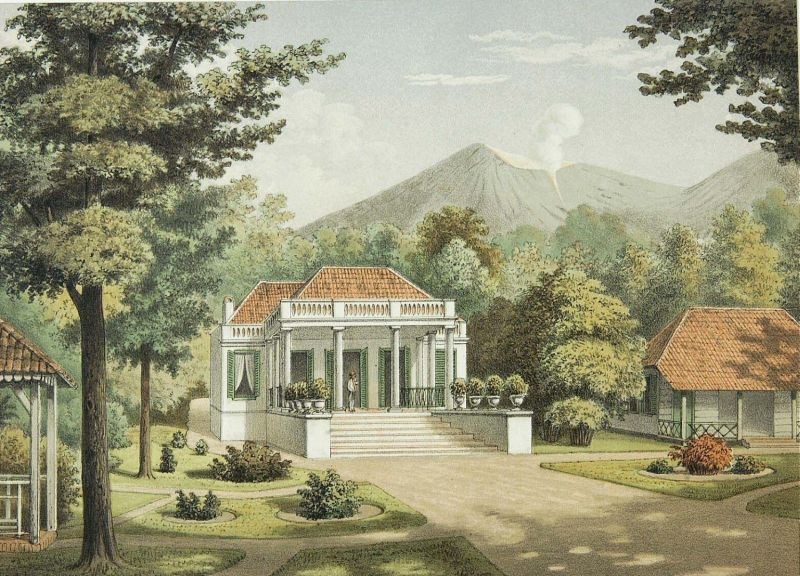
Lithography of Cipanas Palace in the 19th century. Dutch East Indies Governor-generals used the palace as residence (by Josias Cornelis Rappard)
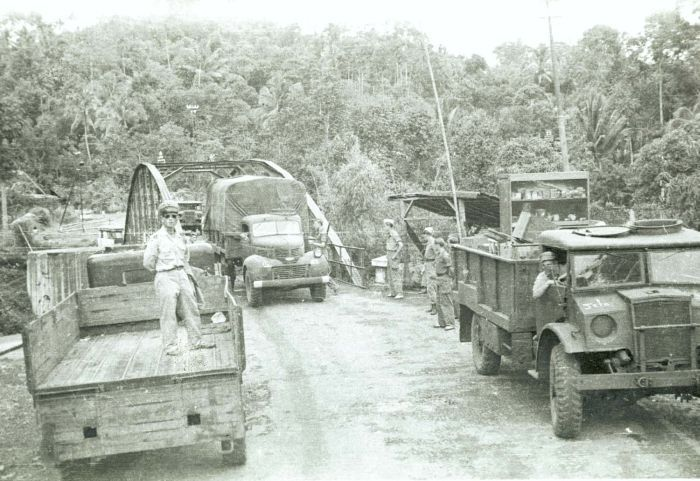
Dutch military convoy passes a bridge near Cipanas c. 1946 during Indonesian National Revolution
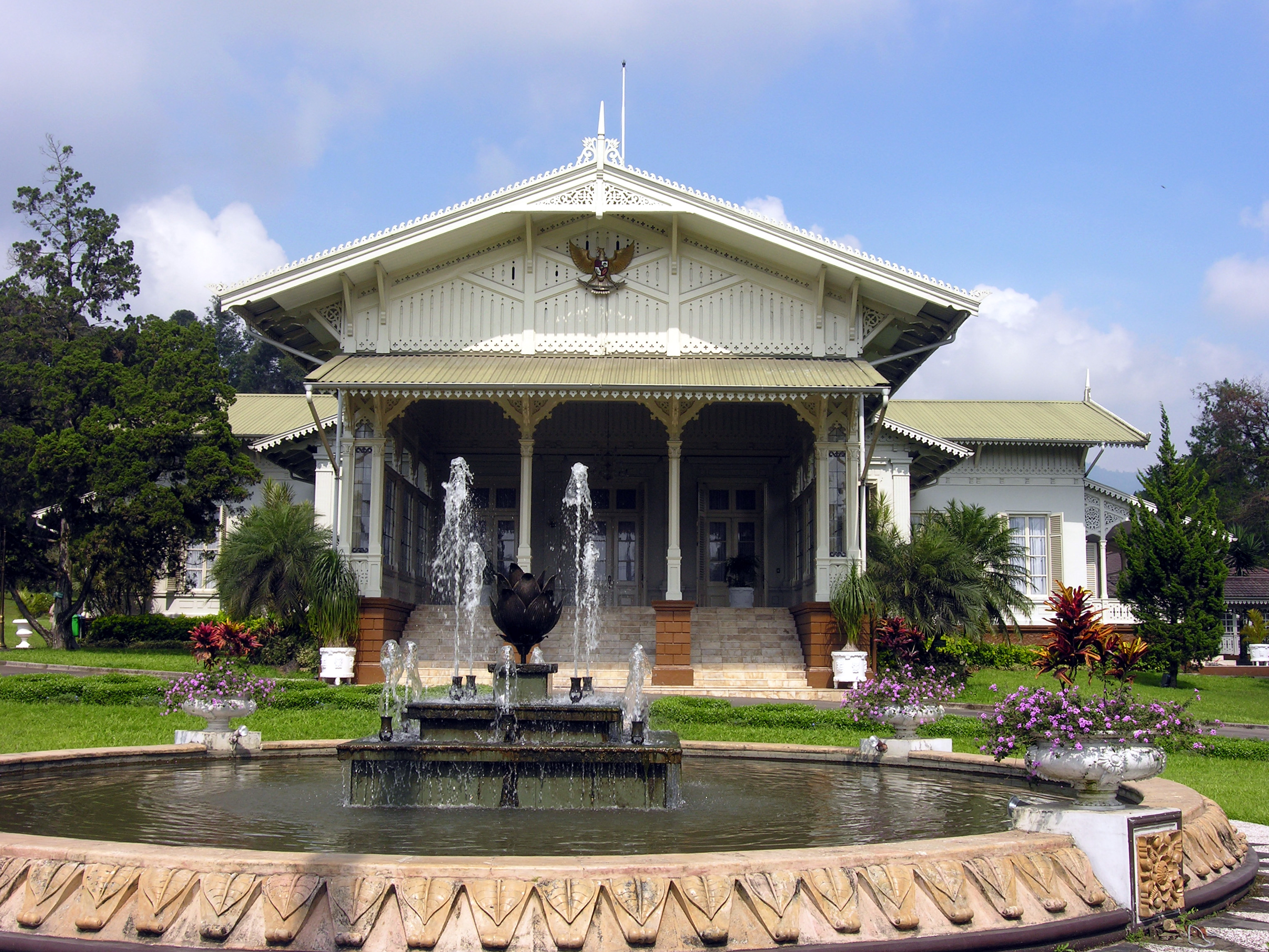
Façade of Cipanas Palace
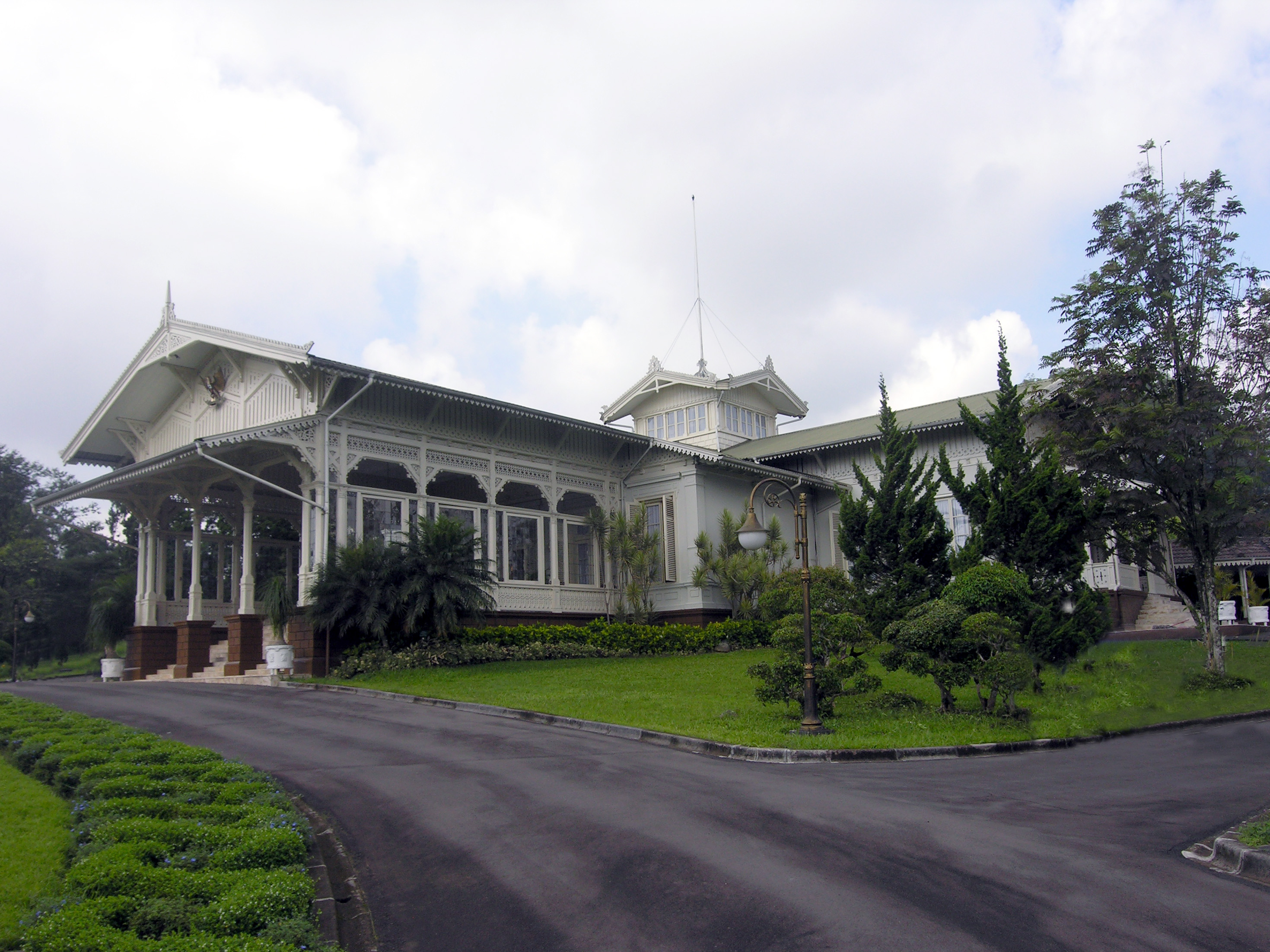
Side view of the palace
