= Karyamukti =

Village in Indonesia

Karyamukti village कार्यमुक्ति
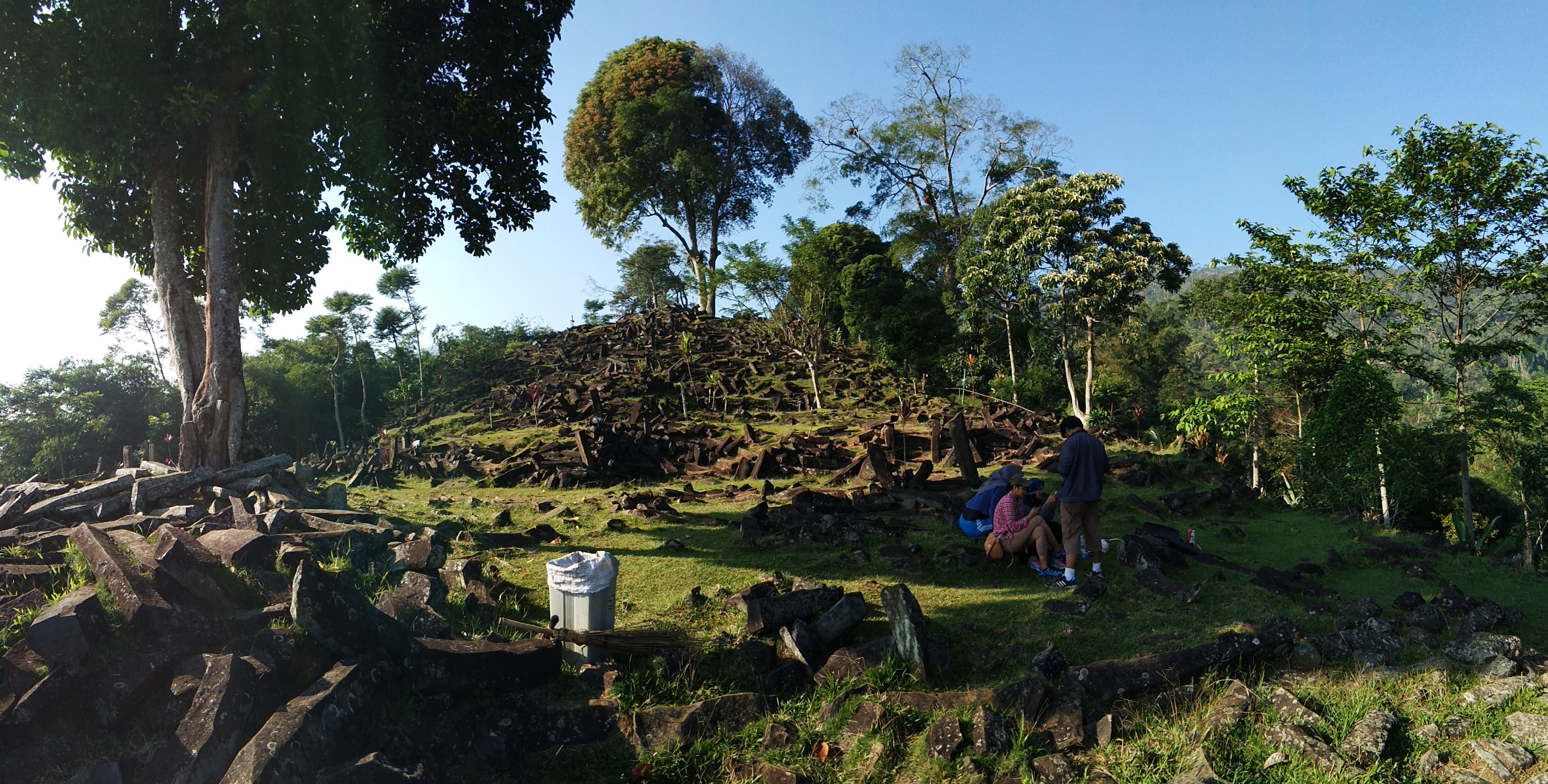
- Gunung Padang Megalithic Site

- Location in Java
- Coordinates: 7.01069131479996°S 107.07311097532511°E
- Country: Indonesia
- District: Campaka
- Regency: Cianjur
- Province: West Java

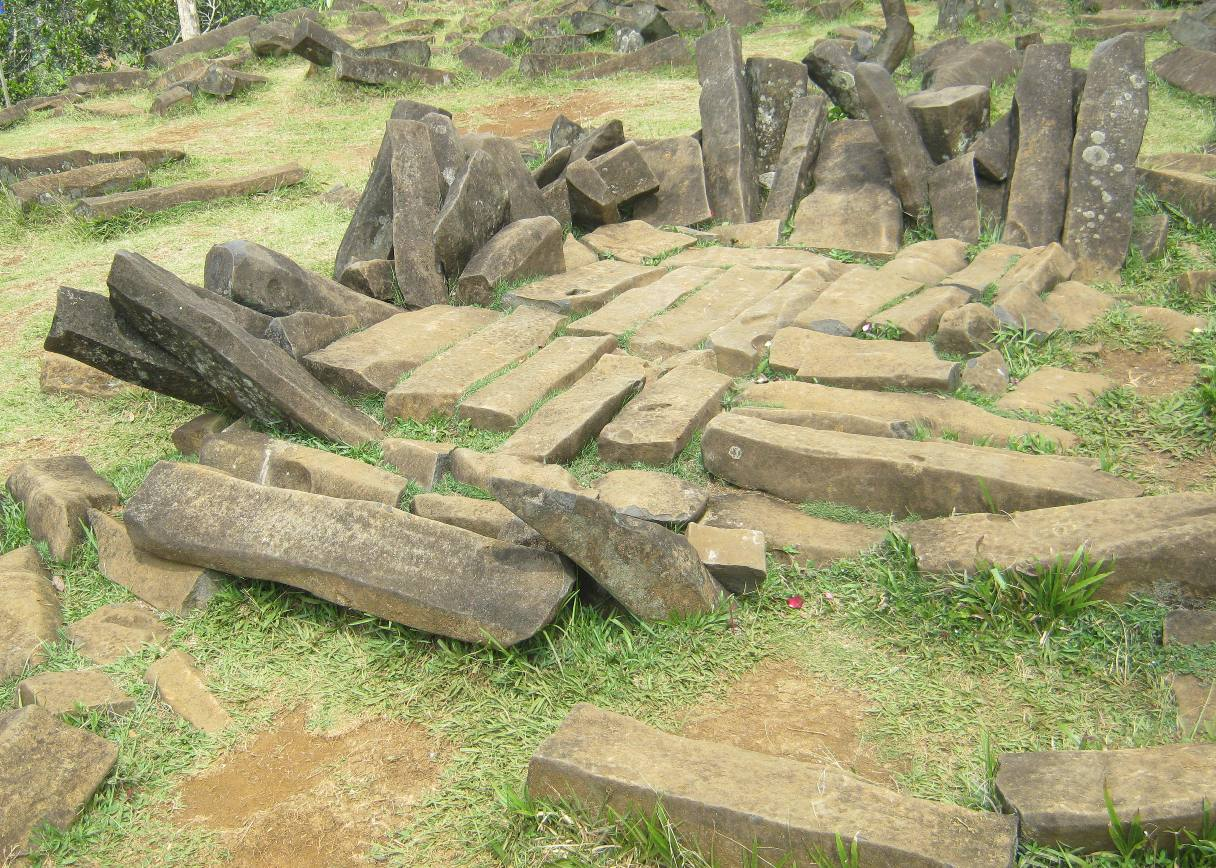
Megalitikum Gunung Padang in Karyamukti village

Karyamukti (Indonesian pronunciation: [karjaˈmʊk̚t̪i]) is a village in district of Campaka in Cianjur Regency, West Java, Indonesia. It is the location of Gunung Padang Megalithic Site, which lies on a hill made of mouth of an extinct volcano.

== See also ==
- Candi of Indonesia
- Greater India
- Hinduism in Indonesia
- History of Indian influence on Southeast Asia
- Indianisation
- Prambanan Temple Compounds, UNESCO heritage listed 6th to 9th century CE Hindu temple in Central Java built by Shailendra dynasty of Mataram Kingdom
- Sunda Kingdom, Sundanese Hindu kingdom from 669 to 1579 CE in western and central Java including Gunung Padang site.
- Taruma Kingdom, 2nd and 6th centuries CE Indianised Hindu kingdom of Western Java to which some construction at Gunung Padang corresponds to.
