= Galudra, West Java =

Galudra
- Location in West Java and Indonesia Galudra (Indonesia)
- Coordinates: 6°47′14.568″S 107°0′40.5252″E
- Country: Indonesia
- Province: West Java
- Regency: Cianjur Regency
- District: Cugenang District
- Elevation: 5,823 ft (1,775 m)

Population (2010)
  - Total: 4,504
- Time zone: UTC+7 (Western Indonesia Time)

Galudra is a village in Cugenang District, Cianjur Regency in West Java Province. Its population was 4504 in 2010.

== Climate ==
Galudra has a subtropical highland climate (Cfb) with heavy to very heavy rainfall year-round.

Climate data for Galudra
Month	Jan	Feb	Mar	Apr	May	Jun	Jul	Aug	Sep	Oct	Nov	Dec	Year
Mean daily maximum °C (°F)	21.0 (69.8)	21.0 (69.8)	21.2 (70.2)	21.3 (70.3)	21.5 (70.7)	21.6 (70.9)	21.5 (70.7)	22.0 (71.6)	22.3 (72.1)	22.0 (71.6)	21.5 (70.7)	21.0 (69.8)	21.5 (70.7)
Daily mean °C (°F)	15.8 (60.4)	15.8 (60.4)	16.0 (60.8)	16.2 (61.2)	16.3 (61.3)	16.0 (60.8)	15.4 (59.7)	15.6 (60.1)	15.9 (60.6)	16.1 (61.0)	16.0 (60.8)	15.7 (60.3)	15.9 (60.6)
Mean daily minimum °C (°F)	10.6 (51.1)	10.7 (51.3)	10.9 (51.6)	11.2 (52.2)	11.1 (52.0)	10.4 (50.7)	9.4 (48.9)	9.2 (48.6)	9.6 (49.3)	10.2 (50.4)	10.5 (50.9)	10.5 (50.9)	10.4 (50.7)
Average precipitation mm (inches)	444 (17.5)	400 (15.7)	407 (16.0)	362 (14.3)	253 (10.0)	149 (5.9)	106 (4.2)	127 (5.0)	164 (6.5)	251 (9.9)	382 (15.0)	361 (14.2)	3,406 (134.2)
Source: Climate-Data.org
