= Herman Suherman =

Indonesian politician (born 1962)

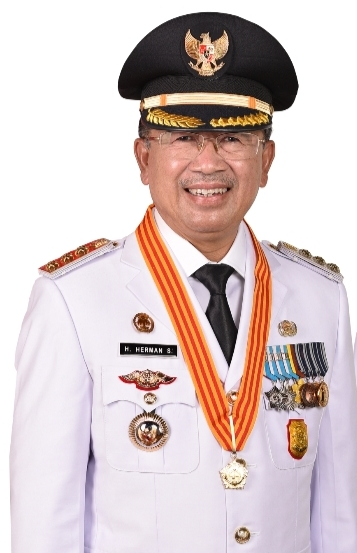

Regent of Cianjur
- In office 18 May 2021; Acting since 14 December 2018 - 18 May 2021 – 20 February 2025
- Preceded by: Irvan Rivano Muchtar
- Succeeded by: Mohammad Wahyu Ferdian

Personal details
- Born: 23 October 1962 (age 63) Cianjur, West Java, Indonesia
- Party: PDI-P

Herman Suherman (born 23 October 1962) is an Indonesian politician of the Indonesian Democratic Party of Struggle and former bureaucrat who is the regent of Cianjur Regency, West Java. He served as acting regent between 2018 and 2021, replacing his predecessor who was arrested on corruption charges, and he became the official regent in 2021 after winning the 2020 regency election. Prior to entering politics, he worked in the regency's government for nearly 30 years.

== Early life ==
Suherman was born on 23 October 1962 at the village of Mangun Kerta in Cianjur Regency, to Pupung Rustandi and Nunung Saadah. After completing school in Cianjur, graduating from a technical school, he studied engineering and received his diploma in 1986.

== Career ==
After his studies, Suherman began to work as a civil servant, joining the public works department of the Cianjur regency government. By 2009, he had been promoted as the head of the environmental office in the regency, head of the forestry and agricultural department in 2010, and in 2014 he was appointed president director of the municipal water company.

In the 2015 Cianjur regency election, Suherman ran as the running mate of Irvan Rivano Muchtar, and the pair was elected with 464,412 votes (49%). They were sworn in on 18 May 2016. Muchtar was arrested by the Corruption Eradication Commission on 14 December 2018, and Suherman was appointed as acting regent in his place. He would remain as acting regent until his swearing in for a second term on 18 May 2021. He had been elected for a full term in the 2020 regency election with 600,394 votes (57%). He is a member of the Indonesian Democratic Party of Struggle.

=== Cianjur earthquake ===
On 21 November 2022, an earthquake struck West Java, with Cianjur being the most affected region. He declared a one-month emergency response status, After evacuation and recovery, Suherman claimed that the earthquake had killed 600 people, in contrast to the National Agency for Disaster Countermeasure's report stating that the earthquake had killed 343. Suherman attributed the discrepancy to families immediately burying victims before they could be counted. The regency government later distributed funds for repairs of damaged houses, however, the program was later partially suspended, with Suherman singling out recipients who did not repair their homes.

== Family ==
He married Anita Sincayani in 1989, and the couple has one son and one daughter.
