= Gunung Padang =

Megalithic site in West Java, Indonesia

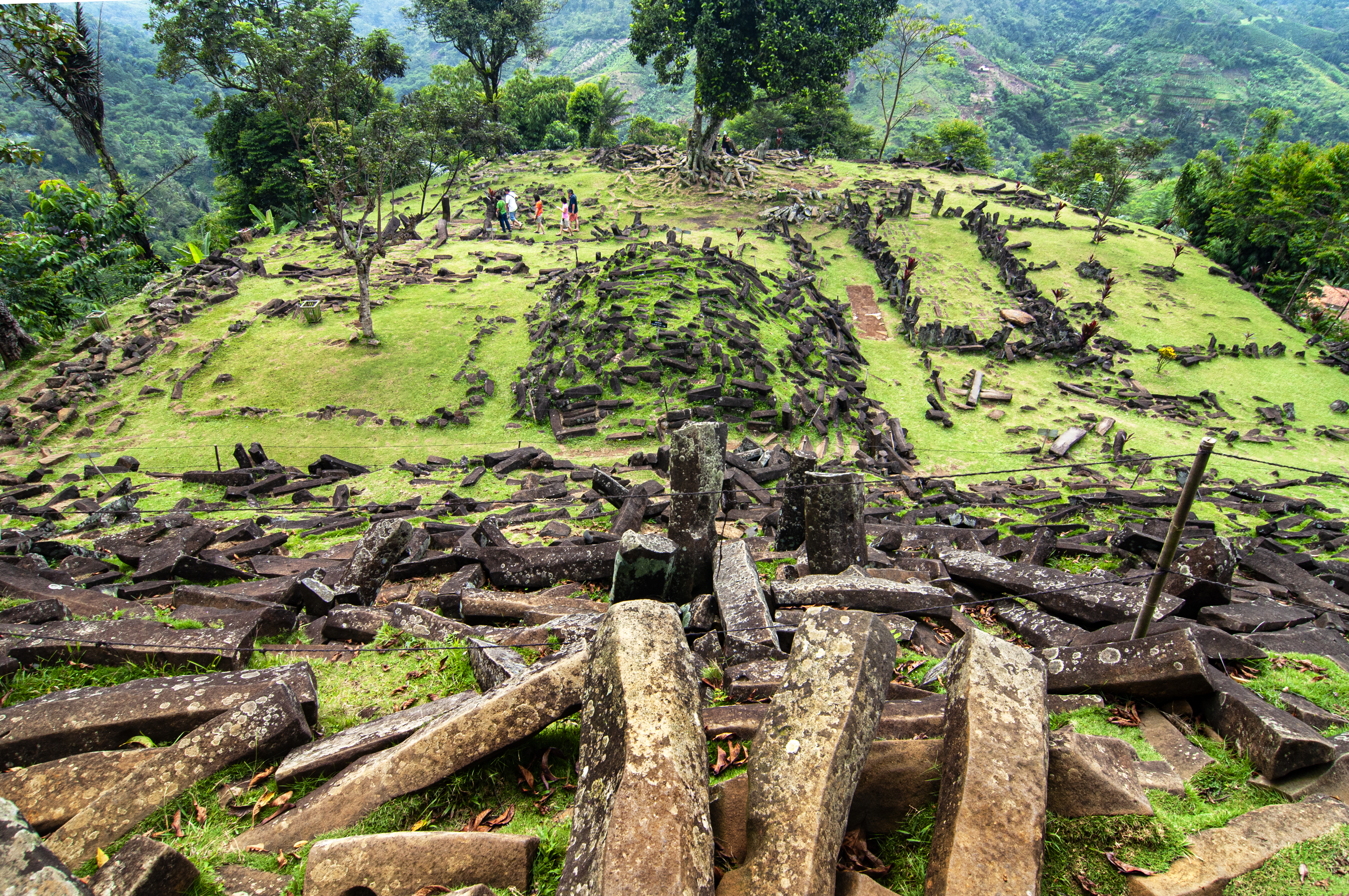
- A view of Gunung Padang

- Location within Indonesia
- Interactive map of Gunung Padang
- 6°59′38″S 107°03′23″E
- Type: Megalith
- Location: Karyamukti, West Java, Indonesia

Site notes
- Archaeologists: Nicolaas Johannes Krom; Lutfi Yondri; Harry Truman Simanjuntak; Ali Akbar
- Discovered: 1890

Gunung Padang is an archaeological site located in Karyamukti, West Java, Indonesia, 50 kilometres (31 mi) southwest of Cianjur. Located at 885 metres (2,904 ft) above sea level, the site covers a hill—an extinct volcano—in a series of five terraces bordered by retaining walls of stone that are accessed by 370 successive andesite steps rising about 95 metres (312 ft). It is covered with massive hexagonal stone columns of volcanic origin. The Sundanese people consider the site sacred and believe it was the result of King Siliwangi's attempt to build a palace in one night.

Gunung Padang consists of a series of five artificial terraces—one rectangular and four trapezoidal—that occur, in succession, at progressively higher elevations. These terraces also diminish in size as elevation increases, with the first being the lowest and largest, and the fifth being the highest and smallest. The terraces are aligned along a central longitudinal NW–SE axis. They are artificial platforms created by lowering elevated areas and filling in depressions until a flat surface was achieved. The perimeters of the terraces feature retaining walls constructed from volcanic polygonal columns, stacked horizontally and erected vertically as posts. Access to the complex is provided by a central stairway with 370 steps, an inclination of 45 degrees, and a length of 110 m (360 ft).

== Geomorphology and geology ==
The Gunung Padang region consists of steep-sided hills with an altitude of 800–1,200 metres (2,600–3,900 ft) above sea level. As seen in satellite images and digital terrain models, Gunung Padang is a small hill partially surrounded by the curved ridge crest of Gunung Empet. The north-facing slopes of Gunung Empet form a steep escarpment facing Gunung Padang and the partial rim of a deeply eroded, circular basin. The south-facing slopes are significantly gentler. North of Gunung Padang, there are Gunung Malang, Pasir Domas, and Pasir Pogor. Gunung Malang is located in the center of this deeply dissected basin. Gunung Padang lies somewhat on the edge of this basin, at the tip of a narrow ridge that continues southward and merges with the northern slope of Gunung Empet. According to the Cianjur geological map by Sujatmiko, the bedrock of the Gunung Padang area consist of basaltic andesite volcanic rocks regionally classified as the Tuffaceous Breccia, Lava, Sandstone, and Conglomerate. These volcanic rocks are intruded by igneous rocks called the Homblenda Pasir Pogor Andesite Intrusion. Based on K–Ar dating from Pertamina, the Homblenda Pasir Pogor Andesite Intrusion is inferred to be about 32.3 ± 0.3 million years old. Based on local field studies, regional geology, and local geomorphology, the circular basin within which Gunung Padang lies is inferred to be the caldera of an extinct, deeply eroded composite volcano, called the Karyamukti composite paleovolcano, which lies at the intersection of the Cimandiri fault (WNW – ENE) and the Gede-Cikondang fault (NNW – SSE).

Gunung Padang, on which the terraces of the Gunung Padang Site lie, is made up of hydrothermally altered volcanic rocks consisting of lava flows alternating with volcanic breccia that are intruded by andesite intrusive rocks. These volcanic rocks, which have been hydrothermally altered to quartz, pyrite, and kaolinite, are part of the deeply eroded Karyamukti composite paleovolcano. Because of their pervasive alteration, they are structurally weak and form an unstable base to Gunung Padang. The intrusive andesites, which correlate with the Homblenda Pasir Pogor Andesite Intrusion, form the top of Gunung Padang. This consists of andesite porphyry exhibiting well-developed columnar jointing, which forms trigonal to hexagonal stone columns that vary in shape and symmetry and in length from 1–3 metres (3 ft 3 in – 9 ft 10 in). The columnar jointing has formed perpendicular to the largely vertical sides of the igneous intrusion. The andesite porphyry consists of plagioclase and pyroxene phenocrysts surrounded by an aphanitic groundmass of volcanic glass. These stone columns have been used as ready-made blocks in the construction of the megaliths at the Gunung Padang Site.

Because of the weak and unstable foundation formed by the hydrothermally altered Karyamukti volcanic rocks, the summit of Gunung Padang partially collapsed during the Late Pleistocene, prior to the creation of the Gunung Padang Site. Evidence of this past collapse can be seen in the deposits of ancient landslides that underlie its western, upper eastern, and northern slopes and northeastern foot. In exposures of these deposits, repeated landslides can be seen to have tilted the long axis of the stone columns parallel to these slopes. This history indicates the continued collapse of Gunung Padang as well as the threats this has created for the archeological site.

Along the eastern side of Gunung Padang, the andesite porphyry and associated stone columns are relatively unweathered, in contrast to the stone columns of the western slope, which have been worn by spheroidal weathering. Some stone columns have weathered further into reddish-brown clay, and some are encased within clay crusts. These clay crusts, which have been mistaken for manmade mortar, are natural weathering rinds formed as a result of weathering penetrating inward from the columnar jointing.

== History of study ==
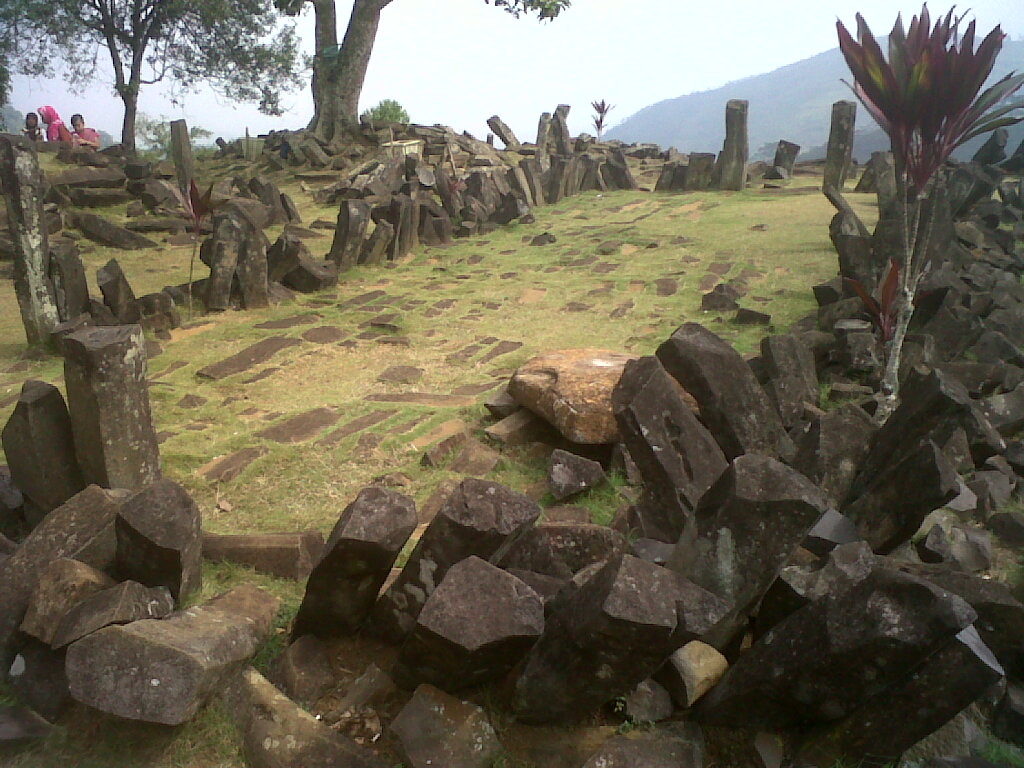
Gunung Padang site

Dutch historian Rogier Verbeek mentioned the existence of the Gunung Padang site in his book Oudheden van Java: lijst der voornaamste overblijfselen uit den Hindoetijd op Java, based on a visit and report by M. De Corte in 1890

Goenoeng Padang : Op den bergtop Goenoeng Padang, nabij Goenoeng Melati, eene opeenvolging van 4 terrassen, door trappen van ruwe steenen verbonden, met ruwe platte steenen bevloerd en met talrijke scherpe en zuilvormige rechtopstaande andesietsteenen versierd. Op ieder terrasse een heuveltje, waarschijnlijk een graf, met steenen omzet en bedekt, en van boven met 2 spitse steenen voorzien. In 1890, door den heer De Corte bezocht.
Gunung Padang : On the mountain top Gunung Padang, near Gunung Melati, a succession of 4 terraces, connected by steps of rough stone, paved with rough flat stones and decorated with numerous sharp and columnar upright andesite stones. On each terrace a small mound, probably a grave, surrounded and covered with stones and topped with 2 pointed stones. In 1890, visited by Mr. De Corte.

— Rogier Verbeek, Oudheden van Java,1891.

The notes on the Gunung Padang site in Verbeek's book are similar to those made by Dutch archaeologist Nicolaas Johannes Krom in the 1914 "Rapporten van de Oudheidkundige Dienst" ("Report of the Department of Antiquities").

After 1914, the site was largely forgotten until 1979, when a group of local farmers rediscovered Gunung Padang. This discovery quickly attracted the attention of the Bandung Institute of Archaeology, the Directorate of Antiquities, PUSPAN (now the Center for Archaeological Research and Development), the local government, and various community groups. Throughout the 1980s, these organizations conducted joint archaeological research and restoration work at Gunung Padang. In 1998, the Indonesian Ministry of Education and Culture declared it a heritage site of local interest. At the end of June 2014, the ministry declared Gunung Padang a National Site Area, covering a total of 29 hectares (72 acres).

On 1 October 2014, surveyors halted excavation activities temporarily, hoping to begin them again under the new government. The 2014 excavation has been criticized by archeologists for being improperly conducted.

== Age estimates ==
Archaeologist Lutfi Yondri from the bureau of archaeology in Bandung has estimated that the structures at Gunung Padang may have been built sometime between the 2nd and 5th centuries CE, thus in the Indonesian late prehistoric period, whereas Harry Truman Simanjuntak has suggested a later date in historical times, between the 6th and 8th centuries CE. Pottery fragments found at the site were dated by the bureau of archaeology in the range 45 BCE–22 CE.

=== Fringe date hypothesis ===
Danny Hilman Natawidjaja, an Indonesian geologist, has claimed that the site had been built as a giant pyramid 9,000 to 20,000 years ago, implying the existence of an otherwise-unknown advanced ancient civilization. Natawidjaja's analysis has been rejected by other scientists. Volcanologist Sutikno Bronto concluded that Gunung Padang is the neck of an ancient volcano and not an artificially created pyramid. Archaeologist Víctor Pérez has described Natawidjaja's conclusions as pseudoarchaeology.

Natawidjaja's ideas gained the attention of Indonesia's president Susilo Bambang Yudhoyono, who set up a task force. An archaeologist who did not wish to be named due to the involvement of the country's president stated:

In archaeology we usually find the 'culture' first ... Then, after we find out the artefact's age we'll seek out historical references to any civilisation which existed around that period. Only then will we be able to explain the artefact historically. In this case, they 'found' something, carbon-dated it, then it looks like they created a civilisation around the period to explain their finding.

Natawidjaja has been joined by activist-turned-politician and member of Yudhoyono's Democratic Party, Andy Arif, in advancing these pseudoarchaeological ideas. 34 Indonesian archaeologists and geologists signed a petition questioning the motives and methods of the Hilman-Arif team and submitted it to Yudhoyono.

In October 2023, an article by Natawidjaja et al., published in Archaeological Prospection, claimed that Gunung Padang is the oldest pyramid in the world, dating as far back as 27,000 years ago. In March 2024, the publisher of Archaeological Prospection, Wiley, and the editors, retracted that paper, stating that:

...the radiocarbon dating was applied to soil samples that were not associated with any artifacts or features that could be reliably interpreted as anthropogenic or "man-made". Therefore, the interpretation that the site is an ancient pyramid built 9,000 or more years ago is incorrect, and the article must be retracted.

== See also ==
- Bosnian pyramid claims
- List of places with columnar jointed volcanics
