= Cikini Hospital =

Hospital in Jakarta, Indonesia

- Primaya Hospital and Communion of Churches in Indonesia
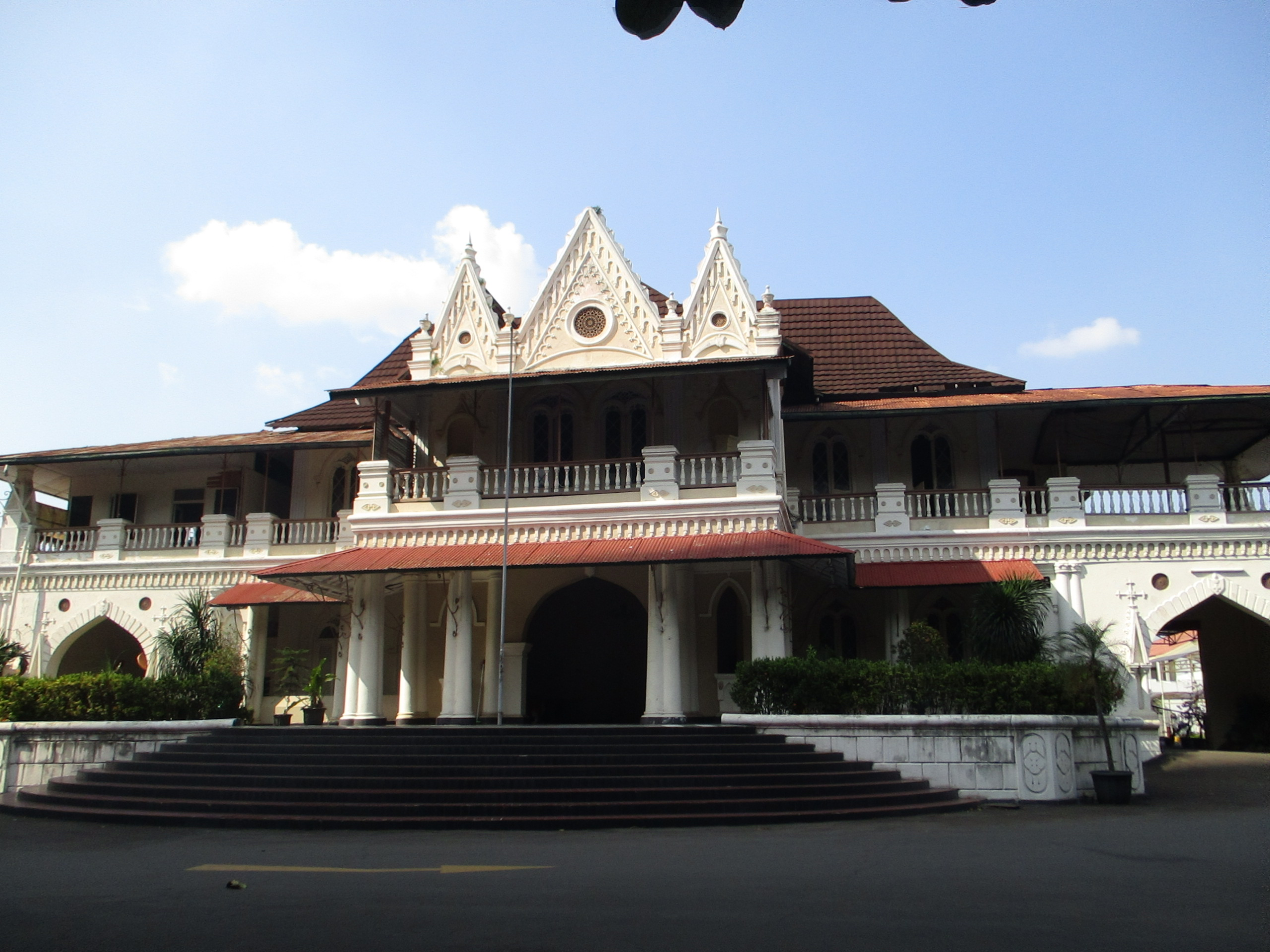
- Main building of Cikini Hospital, 2018

Geography
- Location: Jl. Raden Saleh Raya No.40, RT.12/RW.2, Daerah Khusus Ibukota Jakarta 10330, Indonesia
- Coordinates: 6.191°S 106.842°E

Organisation
- Care system: Private
- Type: District General

Services
- Emergency department: Yes
- Beds: 276

History
- Founded: 1852

Links
- Website: primayahospital.com/rumah-sakit/pgi-cikini/
- Lists: Hospitals in Indonesia

Primaya Hospital PGI Cikini, also known as PGI Cikini Hospital (Rumah Sakit PGI Cikini) or Cikini Hospital (Rumah Sakit Cikini), is a rural general hospital in Cikini, Menteng in Jakarta, Indonesia. It was formerly a mansion that was designed by Indonesian painter Raden Saleh, who used it as residence. Use of it as a hospital and nursing academy began in 1898. The building was built in 1852 and is known for its park-like setting in busy Jakarta, and was home to antelope until they were removed in the early 1970s. Saleh once had a collection of wild animals on the property. It has design features similar to the Callenberg Castle.

The hospital is located at Jalan Raden Saleh No. 40 in Cikini, Central Jakarta on 5.6 ha. It has approximately 300 beds.

The home was visited by Franz Ferdinand in 1893 during his world tour. He saw preparations for the Batavia Exhibition of 1893 on the grounds of the house.

== History ==
On 15 March 1895, Dominee Cornelis de Graaf and his wife, Mrs. Adriana J de Graaf Kooman founded Vereeniging Voor Ziekenverpleging In Indie. The medical center was opened in Gang Pool (near the state palace) on 1 September 1895 as a health service facility. Dominee Cornelis de Graaf and his wife sought funding to start this venture and managed to acquire around 100,000 guilder (which was the currency for Netherlands at the time) from Queen Emma of Netherlands (1879–1890). This funding allowed De Graaf to purchase the mansion which belonged to Raden Saleh in June 1897 and the medical center was transferred from Gang Pool to the newly purchased building.

On 12 January 1898, the status of the medical center was upgraded to a hospital. It became the first Christian Hospital in Indonesia. To honor the generosity of Queen Emma of Netherlands, the building was named Konningin Emma Ziekenhuis (Queen Emma's Hospital).

During the Japanese Occupation (1942–1945), Cikini Hospital was used as a hospital for the Japanese Navy. After the Japanese Occupation (August 1945 – December 1948). Cikini Hospital was managed by Repatriation of Allied Prisoners of War and Internees (RAPWI) and eventually by Dienst der Volksgezondheid (DVG).

In 1948, the management of Cikini Hospital was handed over to a private foundation led by R.F. Bozkelman. In 1957, the management of Stichting Medische Voorziening Koningen Emma Ziekenhuis Tjikini was handed over to Indonesian Church Council (Dewan Gereja-gereja di Indonesia - DGI), with Prof. Dr. Joedono as the acting director. Afterwards, Dr. H. Sinaga was appointed as the first official director of the hospital. Stichting Medische Voorziening Koningen Emma Ziekenhuis Tjikini Foundation was then renamed to Yayasan Rumah Sakit DGI Tjikini.

On 31 March 1989, due to the name change from DGI to PGI, Yayasan RS DGI Tjikini was renamed to Yayasan Kesehatan PGI Cikini.

Cikini Hospital is surrounded by a large garden which used to be a botanical garden and a zoo.

== Services ==
Cikini Hospital has many specialties onsite including:

- Cardiology
- Critical care
- Emergency medicine
- Endocrinology
- Family practice
- General surgery
- Gynecology
- Internal medicine
- Nephrology
- Obstetrics
- Oncology (medical & surgical)

== School ==
Besides a hospital, Yayasan Kesehatan PGI Cikini also runs a nursing academy called Akademi Perawatan RS PGI Cikini, which offers diploma and bachelor's degrees in nursing.

== Gallery ==
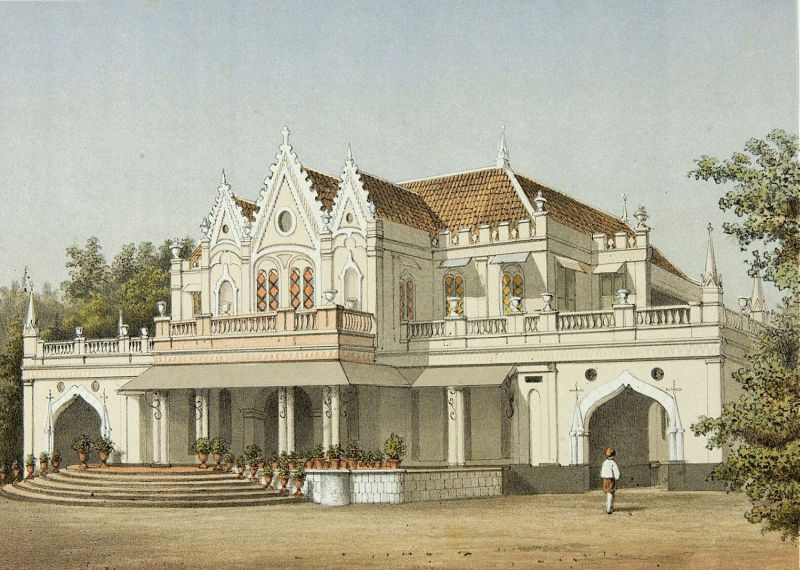
1880s lithograph by Josias Cornelis Rappard

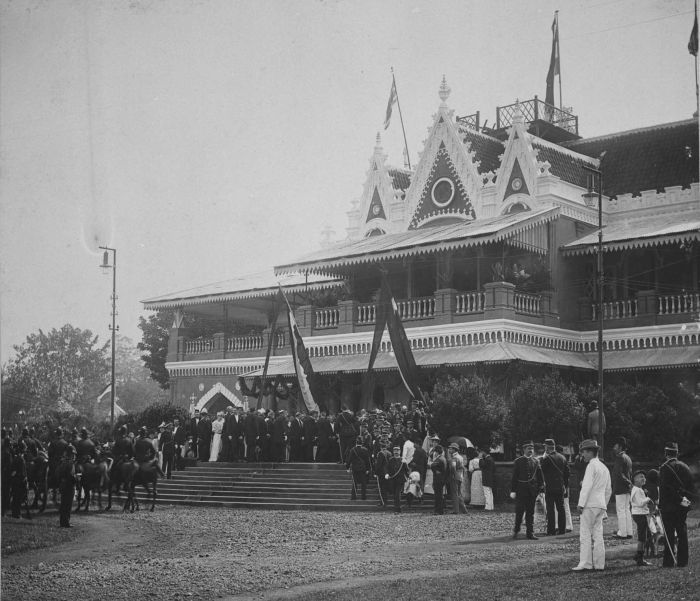
Raden Saleh's home was used for an exhibition in Batavia in 1893

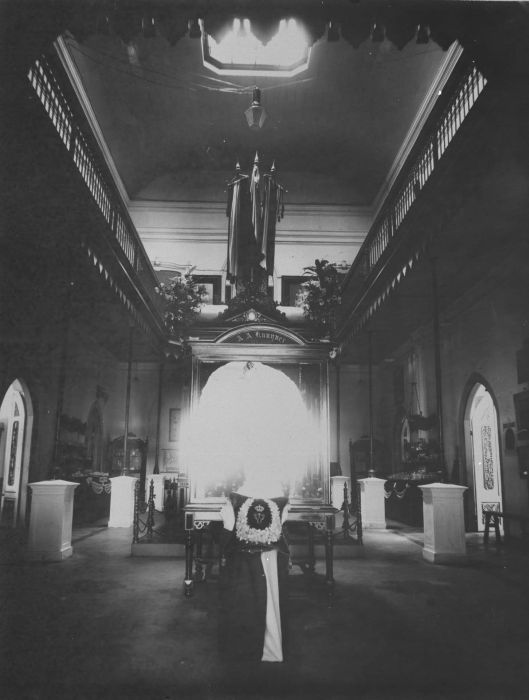
Interior during the 1893 exhibition at Batavia

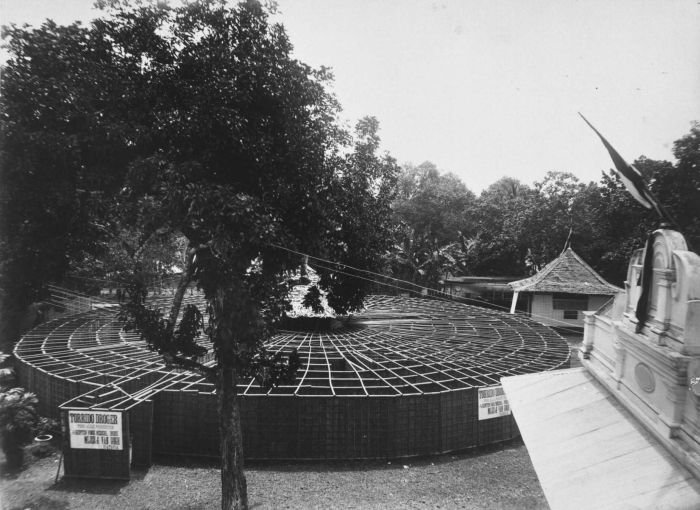
A labyrinth (maze) constructed for the 1893 exhibition at Batavia

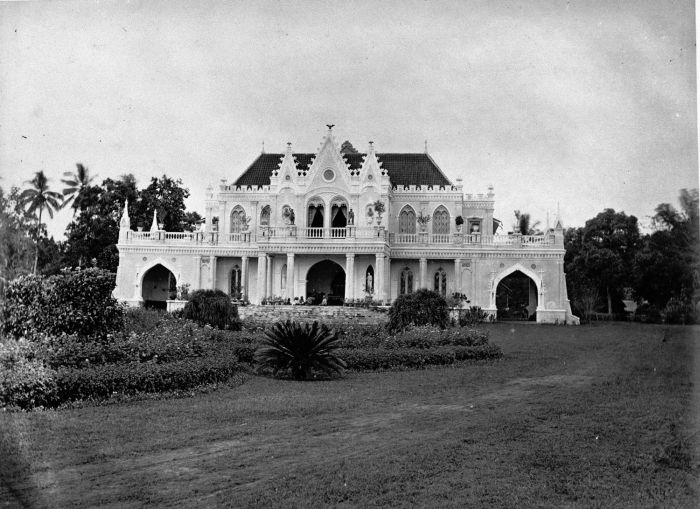

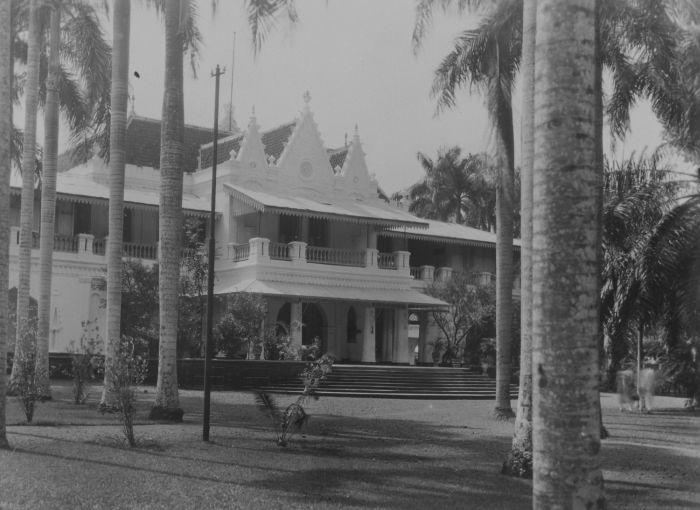
