= Cipanas Palace =

Presidential palace in West Java, Indonesia

- Istana Cipanas
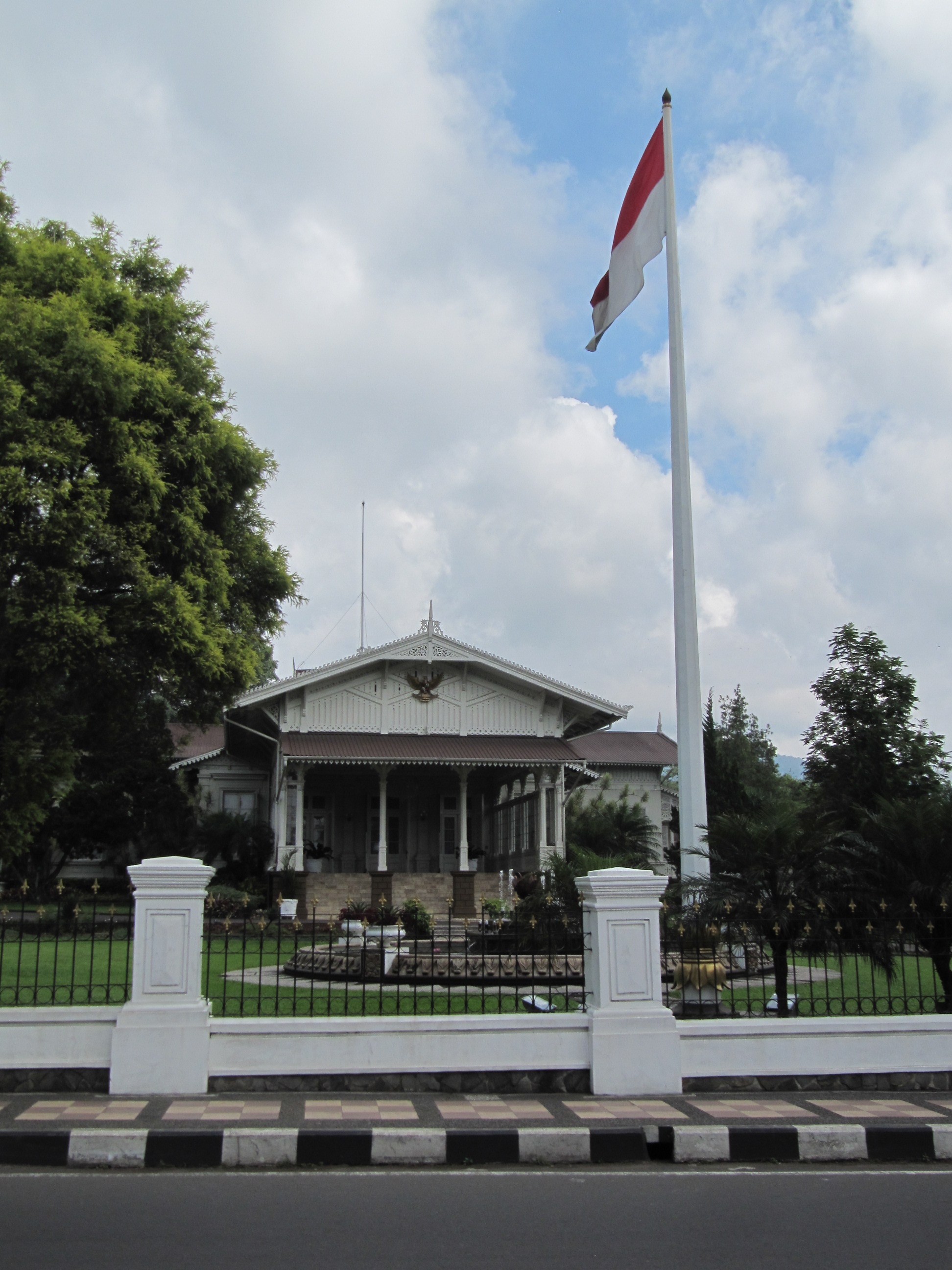
- Cipanas Palace
- Interactive map of the Cipanas Palace area
- Alternative names: Tjipanas palace

General information
- Architectural style: Old Indies Style
- Location: Cipanas, Indonesia, Indonesia
- Coordinates: 6.733569°S 107.041077°E
- Elevation: 1,100 m (3,609 ft)
- Construction started: 1740
- Client: Indonesian government
- Owner: Indonesian government

Technical details
- Structural system: wood
- Floor area: 7,760 m^{2} (83,500 sq ft)

Cipanas Palace (Indonesian pronunciation: [Istana tʃipanas] Istana Cipanas) is one of the seven presidential palaces of Republic of Indonesia. It is located in Cipanas, West Java, Indonesia, near a highway connecting Jakarta and Bandung through Puncak. Located approximately 103 kilometres (64 mi) from Jakarta, or about 20 kilometres (12 mi) from the city of Cianjur. Cipanas Palace is located in the village of Cipanas in Cianjur Regency, at the foot of Mount Gede and at an altitude of 1,100 metres (3,600 ft) above sea level. The building stands on an area of approximately 26 hectares (64 acres), with the area of the building approximately 7,760 square metres (83,500 sq ft).

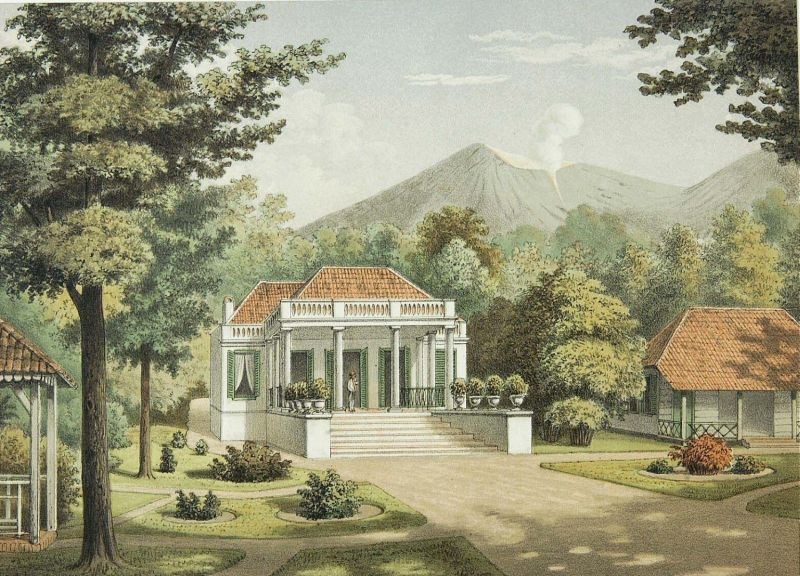
Watercolor Lithography of Cipanas Palace as the residence of Dutch East Indies Governor-generals in 1880 by Josias Cornelis Rappard

== History ==
The palatial residence was erected by a Dutch landlord named Van Heuts in 1740 during the rule of Governor General Gustaaf Willem van Imhoff. The area's reputation was for clean, fresh and cool mountain air and the building was made into a resort for Dutch Governor Generals.

The Cipanas villa (before it became Palace) was also the place where van Imhoff died in 1750, after being sick for two months. His body was buried in Tanah Abang, Jakarta, with a full Military rites. Besides being known as a builder of Buitenzorg Palace, Cisarua hospitals, and villas in Cipanas, Van Imhoff also known for establishing services in Academie de Marine at West Kalibesar, where the building was later named the Red Store.

Commissioner General Leonard du Bus de Gisignies also loved to visit the palace for sulfur bathing and brought his secretary Sirardus Willem Carel graaf van Hogendorp (1820-1841). During their administration, Herman Willem Daendels (1808-1811) and Stamford Raffles (1811-1816) employed a few hundred people assigned to work in apple farms, flower gardens or in rice mills, as well as to take care of cows, sheep, and horses.

Cipanas Presidential Palace also functioned as family residence of several Governors-General of the Netherlands East-Indies and their families. Among them were Andries Cornelis Dirk de Graeff and family (1926-1931), Bonifacius Cornelis de Jonge (1931), and the last was Alidius Tjarda van Starkenborgh Stachouwer shortly before the Japanese occupation of the Dutch East Indies occurred in 1942, where he and his family were then taken as Japanese prisoners and transferred to the Manchurian camp at Hsien in China.

Sukarno visited the Cipanas Palace frequently, mainly as a place to find inspiration for his speeches, especially to alert independence on 17 August. The peaceful Cipanas and cool atmosphere was like a magnet that attracted all the ideas stored in the minds of Sukarno to paper. The Cipanas Palace was also the place where Sukarno held his wedding ceremony with Hartini in 1953.

In 1954, Sukarno ordered the development of a remote studio in one of the top of the hill nearby the Cipanas Palace as a place to contemplate. Hilltop was chosen because it is a point where people can view Mount Gede in the morning clearly, before the fog then covered the peak.

Cipanas Presidential Palace has also been used for important events in the history of Republik Indonesia. On 13 December 1965, the dining Room in main Building was used by Sukarno's cabinet to have a meeting in making decision to change Indonesian money value from 1,000 to Rp 1.00 (Redenomination) during economic administration position held by Finance Minister Frans Seda.

In accordance with its function, the palace is not used to receive guests except for certain occasions, such as during the visit of Queen Juliana of the Netherlands to Indonesia in 1971, where she took the time to stop at the palace when visiting Indonesia. On April 14–17, 1993, Cipanas Palace was also used as a meeting place for Philippine's warring factions on the initiative of President Suharto. Foreign Minister Ali Alatas led negotiations between the Philippine government and the MNLF group (Moro National Liberation Front) led by Nur Misuari. All delegates were staying at Cipanas palace complex.

== Construction ==
The palace was built originally as a resort place and a stopover during Dutch ruling. The yard is divided into two areas, namely the palace garden area and forest area of the palace. Until 2001, In the palace's forest areas there were 1,334 specimens, 171 species, 132 genus (out of it only 14 are known), and 61 families of flora and fauna identified.

Presidential Palace consists of a main building, six pavilions, a special building, and two other buildings, one is as a reservoir of hot spring water and another one as a mosque.

Parent building, which is officially called Gedung Induk Istana Kepresidenan Cipanas, stands on an area of 982 square metres (10,570 sq ft). As the name implies, this building is the biggest building when compared to other buildings in the palace complex. The main Building is used by Indonesian President or Vice President and their families for retreat and relaxing. The original structure of the main building was built using Teak wood and enforced with cast iron. In later development, some of the floors and walls renovated with brick and mortar materials, although the renovation of the building's original design eliminates the original stage house concept.

The main Building, in accordance with its function, consisting of living room, bedroom, den, powder room, dining room, and back porch. In particular, the living room is on a stage with wooden floor. One of the main building's main hallway wall decorated with a painting by Soejono DS, which painted in 1958. This painting is known by the name Jalanan Seribu Pandang. The name of the painting was perpetuated itself because of its merits, namely that from whichever direction the painting is seen at, the painted eyes appear to see directly to the viewer.

Although built gradually, the palace's six pavilions were finally built around the Main Building, precisely in the backyard of the building . These six pavilions named after Wayang characters in Hindu epic Mahabharata: Yudhishthira Pavilion, Bhima Pavilion, Arjuna Pavilion, Nakula Pavilion, Sahadeva Pavilion, and Abhimanyu Pavilion. The first three pavilions were built during Dutch ruling in 1916, while the later three were built in around 1983 during Suharto's presidency. In addition, there are also two other buildings that are named Tumaritis I Pavilion and Tumaritis II Pavilion, which is located slightly apart from the Main Building and the sixth around the pavilion.

Bentol building is a unique building located behind the Main Building and much smaller than the Main Building and six pavilions. However, this building stands taller than the other buildings, including the Main Building. This is due to the fact that this building is located on the slope of mountain. The building is a product of two Indonesian architects, R.M. Soedarsono and Friedrich Silaban.

At the rear of the Main Building, there are some other buildings. However, the most substantial role to the existence of the Presidential Palace in Cipanas is its mineral hot springs. Therefore, to accommodate the overflow of water from natural sources, two buildings as Bath houses were built. One bath house is devoted for president or vice President and their families, while another larger bath house reserved for other people that accompanied the President or Vice President. Both first and the second bath house are furnished with bath furniture and amenities.

Not far from the bath house, there is an open fishing pond. In addition, on the left backyard of main Building there is a mosque named Masjid Baiturrahim as well as several other series of small buildings as office spaces. On the left side of the Main Building there is a Plant nursery used to maintain and develop gardens around the place.

== Gallery ==
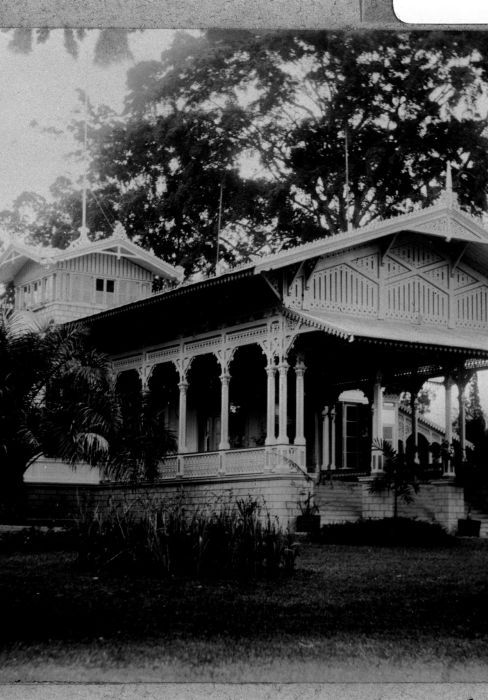
Picture of Istana Cipanas taken on 28 September 1904

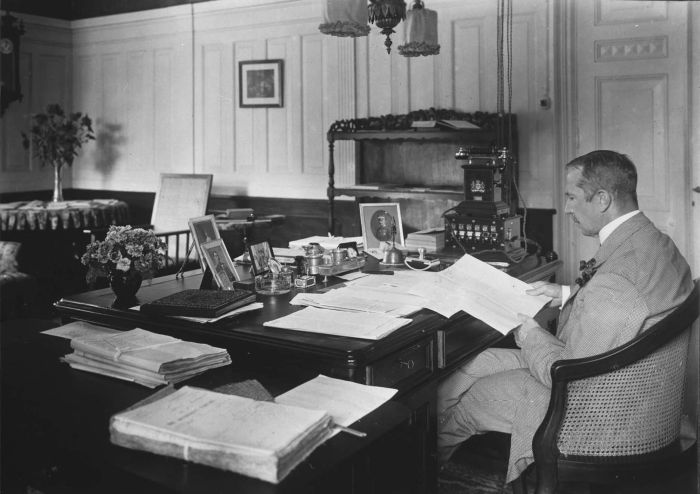
The Governor-General Johan Paul van Limburg Stirum behind his desk in his summer residence at Istana Cipanas, 1921

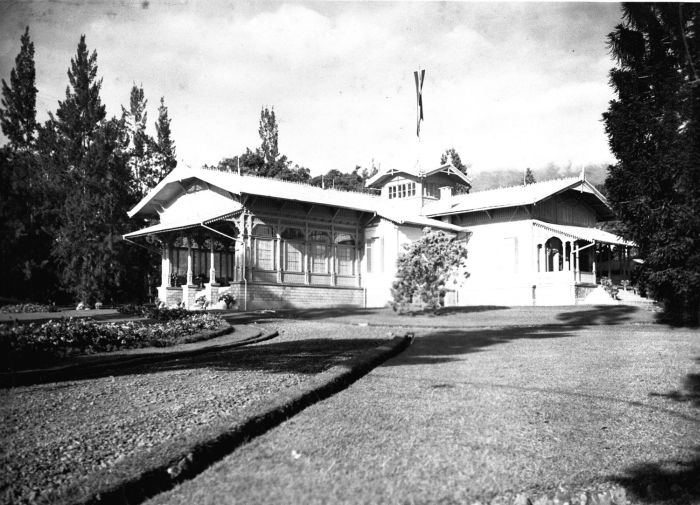
Cipanas Palace in around 1930 as the residence of Governor-General Andries Cornelis Dirk de Graeff

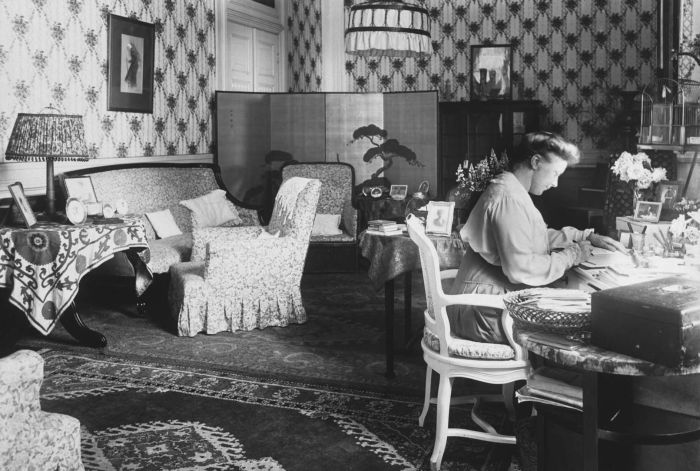
Wife of the Governor-General Johan Paul van Limburg Stirum was writing a letter at the Cipanas Palace, 1921

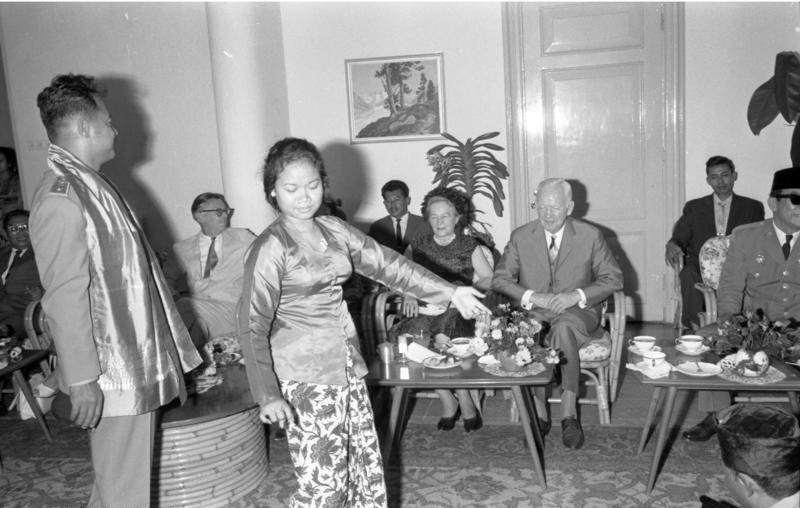
A state Visit of the German President Heinrich Lübke to Indonesia in 1963 with dance performance at the Cipanas Palace, Oct 30, 1963. The right most is Sukarno

== See also ==
- Bogor Palace
- Gedung Agung
- Istana Negara (Jakarta)
- Merdeka Palace
- List of palaces in Indonesia
