= Cipanas, Cianjur =

District of Cianjur Regency, West Java, Indonesia

Cipanas
- District
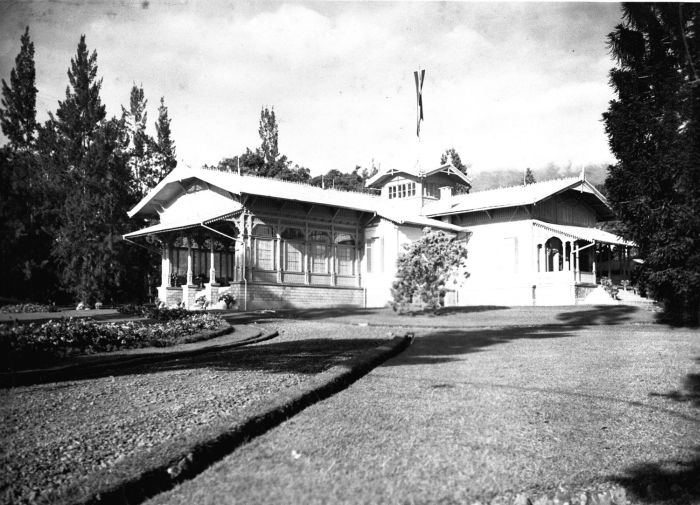
- Cipanas Palace in around 1930

- Location in Java
- Coordinates: 6.727012°S 107.043738°E
- Country: Indonesia
- Province: West Java
- Regency: Cianjur Regency

Area
  - Total: 67.28 km^{2} (25.98 sq mi)
- Elevation: 1,080 m (3,540 ft)
- Highest elevation: 2,900 m (9,500 ft)
- Lowest elevation: 884 m (2,900 ft)

Population (mid 2022 estimate)
  - Total: 115,574
  - Density: 1,718/km^{2} (4,449/sq mi)
- Time zone: UTC+7 (Indonesia Western Time)
- Postal code: 43253
- Area code: (+62) 263
- Vehicle registration: F

Cipanas is a district in the extreme northwest corner of Cianjur Regency in West Java, Indonesia. It had an area of 67.28 km^{2} and a population of 103,911 at the 2010 Census. which had increased to 113,592 at the 2020 Census; the official estimate as at mid 2022 was 115,574.

== Administration ==
Cipanas consists of 7 villages namely:

- Batulawang
- Ciloto
- Cimacan
- Cipanas
- Palasari
- Sindangjaya
- Sindanglaya

All the villages addressed with the same postcode 43253.

== Climate ==
Climate data for Cipanas, Cianjur, West Java, Indonesia (elevation 1,074 m or 3,524 ft)
Month	Jan	Feb	Mar	Apr	May	Jun	Jul	Aug	Sep	Oct	Nov	Dec	Year
Mean daily maximum °C (°F)	23.2 (73.8)	23.2 (73.8)	23.8 (74.8)	24.1 (75.4)	24.1 (75.4)	23.9 (75.0)	24.1 (75.4)	24.7 (76.5)	25.3 (77.5)	24.9 (76.8)	24.2 (75.6)	23.6 (74.5)	24.1 (75.4)
Daily mean °C (°F)	19.5 (67.1)	19.5 (67.1)	19.7 (67.5)	19.9 (67.8)	20.1 (68.2)	19.8 (67.6)	19.7 (67.5)	20.0 (68.0)	20.3 (68.5)	20.2 (68.4)	20.0 (68.0)	19.8 (67.6)	19.9 (67.8)
Mean daily minimum °C (°F)	17.1 (62.8)	17.1 (62.8)	17.0 (62.6)	17.1 (62.8)	17.0 (62.6)	16.4 (61.5)	15.9 (60.6)	16.1 (61.0)	16.4 (61.5)	16.9 (62.4)	17.3 (63.1)	17.2 (63.0)	16.8 (62.2)
Average precipitation mm (inches)	342 (13.5)	327 (12.9)	334 (13.1)	289 (11.4)	164 (6.5)	111 (4.4)	94 (3.7)	97 (3.8)	129 (5.1)	270 (10.6)	376 (14.8)	363 (14.3)	2,896 (114.1)
Average relative humidity (%)	88	89	88	87	86	82	77	73	72	77	85	87	83
Mean daily sunshine hours	6.6	6.3	7.0	6.9	7.2	7.6	7.8	8.1	8.4	8.0	7.4	7.3	7.4
Source: https://en.climate-data.org/asia/indonesia/west-java/cipanas-601231/#climate-table
