= Danny Hilman Natawidjaja =

Indonesian geologist

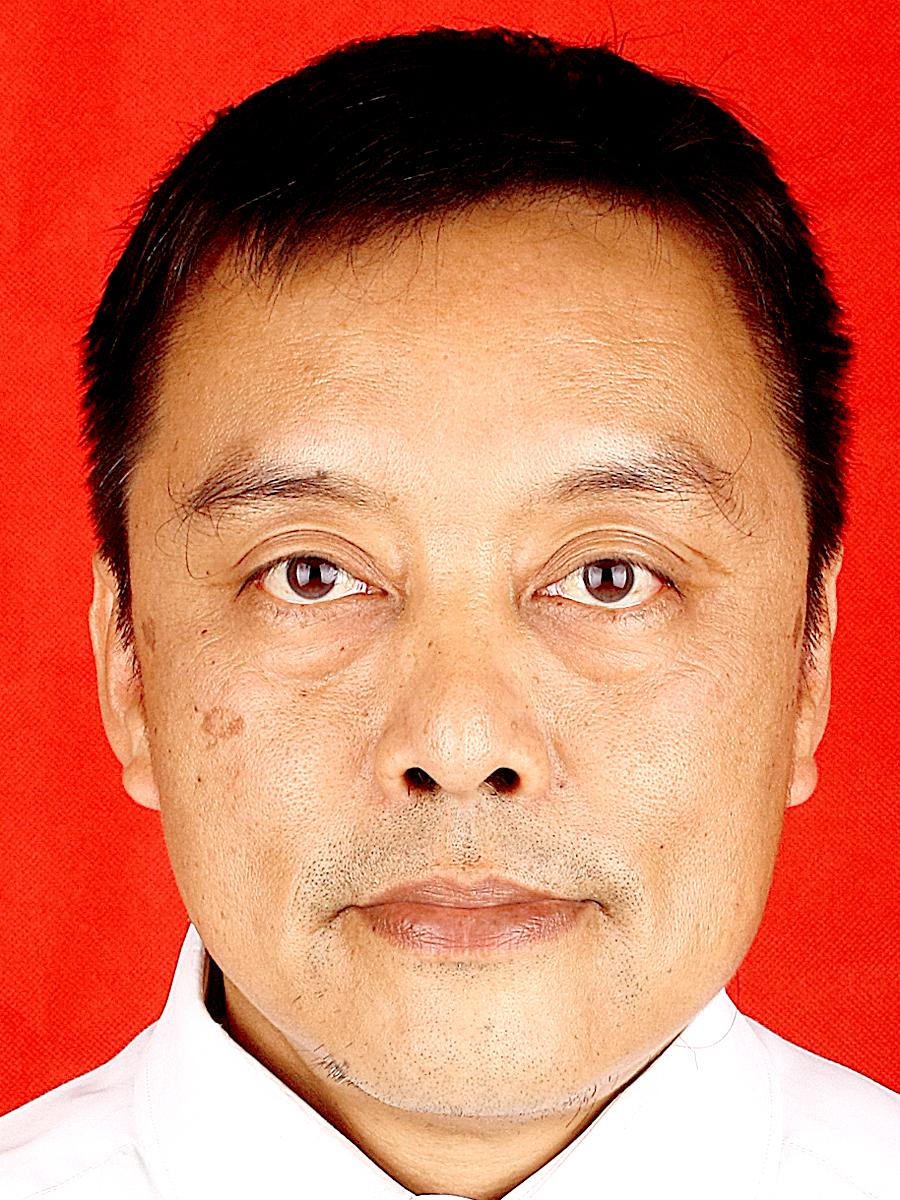
- Born: Subang, Jawa Barat
- Education: Institut Teknologi Bandung (BSc); University of Auckland (MSc); Caltech (PhD)
- Occupation: Researcher
- Known for: Earthquake expert

Danny Hilman Natawidjaja is an Indonesian geologist specializing in earthquake geology and geotectonics at the Indonesian Institute of Sciences (LIPI) Research Center for Geotechnology.

In Indonesia, Natawidjaja has contributed to research on local tectonic plates. Since 2000, he has made predictions regarding the earthquake on the west coast of Sumatra Island.

== Education ==
Natawidjaja graduated with a BSc degree in geology from the Bandung Institute of Technology (Indonesia) in 1984. He then went to the University of Auckland (New Zealand) where he obtained an MSc degree (with Honors) in Geology in 1992. Finally, he went to the California Institute of Technology (Caltech, United States) where he earned a PhD in Geology in 1998, with a thesis focussing on neotectonics and earthquake studies.

== Career ==
Natawidjaja became the initiator and coordinator of earthquake research at LIPI in 2002. With grants, he pioneered and developed a continuous network of SuGAr GPS stations since 2002 to monitor tectonic movements in Sumatra in collaboration with Caltech USA and the Earth Observatory of Singapore.

He became the head of the national team for the preparation of Guidelines for Natural Disaster Risk Analysis (PARBA) organized by UNDP and BNPB in 2008–2009.

He initiated and became a core member of Team-9 to revise the National MapSeismic Hazard Indonesia which was later published by the Ministry of PUPR in 2010 and used as the main reference in Standar Nasional Indonesia 1726-2012 for the implementation of earthquake resistant building codes.

He initiated and developed a Postgraduate program in Earthquake Studies at ITB known as the Graduate Research in Earthquake and Active Tectonics (GREAT) Program which was funded by the Australian-Indonesia Facility for Earthquake Disaster Reduction (AIFDR) bilateral program 2010–2017.

He became Chair of the Geology Working Group of the National Earthquake Study Center (PuSGeN) since 2016 to revise the Seismic Hazard Map of Indonesia which was then published by the Ministry of PUPR in 2017 and referred to by SNI 1726–2019 to replace the previous SNI.

In 2018, Natawidjaja was cited in multiple media articles about the July 2018 Lombok earthquake and aftershocks.

== Pyramid claims ==
In 2011, he took a leading part in the controversial geological survey of the archeological site at Gunung Padang as chief geologist of the government-sponsored Tim Terpadu Riset Mandiri (TTRM, 'Integrated and Independent Research Team').

Natawidjaja's conclusions gained the attention of Indonesia's President Susilo Bambang Yudhoyono, who set up a task force. An archaeologist who did not wish to be named due to the involvement of the country's president, stated:

In archaeology we usually find the 'culture' first … Then, after we find out the artefact's age we'll seek out historical references to any civilisation which existed around that period. Only then will we be able to explain the artefact historically. In this case, they 'found' something, carbon-dated it, then it looks like they created a civilisation around the period to explain their finding.

In October 2023, an article by Natawidjaja et al., published in Archaeological Prospection, claimed that Gunung Padang is the oldest pyramid in the world, dating as far back as 27,000 years ago. In March of 2024, the publisher of Archaeological Prospection, Wiley, and the editors, retracted that paper stating that:

...the radiocarbon dating was applied to soil samples that were not associated with any artifacts or features that could be reliably interpreted as anthropogenic or “man-made.” Therefore, the interpretation that the site is an ancient pyramid built 9000 or more years ago is incorrect, and the article must be retracted.

In 2023 he claimed to have discovered a 75,000 year old pyramid in Lake Toba, north Sumatra. The Indonesian Geological Agency expressed doubts about the claim, suggesting that it may be one of the triangular facets found on the hills of the lake that formed after the caldera was formed and then used by later civilizations.

== Awards ==
- Sarwono Prawirohardjo Award from the Indonesian Institute of Sciences (2005);
- Satyalancana Karya Satya X Year (1999), Satyalancana Karya Satya XX Year (2008) and Satyalancana Karya Satya XXX Year (2017) from the President of the Republic of Indonesia.

== Publications ==
- Natawidjaya, Danny Hilman (2013). Plato tidak bohong Atlantis ada di Indonesia [Plato Never Lied: Atlantis Is In Indonesia] (in Indonesian). Indonesia: Booknesia. ISBN 978-6021832929.

=== Selected journal articles ===
- Sieh, K; Natawidjaja, D (December 10, 2000). "Neotectonics of the Sumatran fault, Indonesia". Journal of Geophysical Research: Solid Earth. 105 (B12): 28295–28326. Bibcode:2000JGR...10528295S. doi:10.1029/2000JB900120. hdl:10356/95544.
- Natawidjaja, DH; Sieh, K; Ward, SN; Cheng, H; et al. (April 2004). "Paleogeodetic records of seismic and aseismic subduction from central Sumatran microatolls, Indonesia". Journal of Geophysical Research: Solid Earth. 109 (B4). Bibcode:2004JGRB..109.4306N. doi:10.1029/2003JB002398. hdl:10220/8477.
- Briggs, RW; Sieh, K; Meltzner, AJ; Natawidjaja, D; et al. (March 31, 2006). "Deformation and slip along the Sunda megathrust in the great 2005 Nias-Simeulue earthquake". Science. 311 (5769): 1897–1901. Bibcode:2006Sci...311.1897B. doi:10.1126/science.1122602. hdl:10356/79825. PMID 16574861. S2CID 37163786.
- Natawidjaja, DH; Sieh, K; Chlieh, M; Galetzka, J; et al. (June 2006). "Source parameters of the great Sumatran megathrust earthquakes of 1797 and 1833 inferred from coral microatolls". Journal of Geophysical Research: Solid Earth. 111 (B6). Bibcode:2006JGRB..111.6403N. doi:10.1029/2005JB004025. hdl:10220/8480.
- Chlieh, M; Avouac, JP; Sieh, K; Natawidjaja, DH; et al. (May 2008). "Heterogeneous coupling of the Sumatran megathrust constrained by geodetic and paleogeodetic measurements". Journal of Geophysical Research: Solid Earth. 113 (B5). Bibcode:2008JGRB..113.5305C. doi:10.1029/2007JB004981. hdl:10220/8493.
- Sieh, K; Natawidjaja, DH; Meltzner, AJ; Shen, CC; et al. (December 12, 2008). "Earthquake supercycles inferred from sea-level changes recorded in the corals of west Sumatra". Science. 322 (5908): 1674–1678. Bibcode:2008Sci...322.1674S. doi:10.1126/science.1163589. hdl:10220/8670. PMID 19074346. S2CID 39894566.
