= Josias Cornelis Rappard =

Dutch soldier and artist (1824–1898)

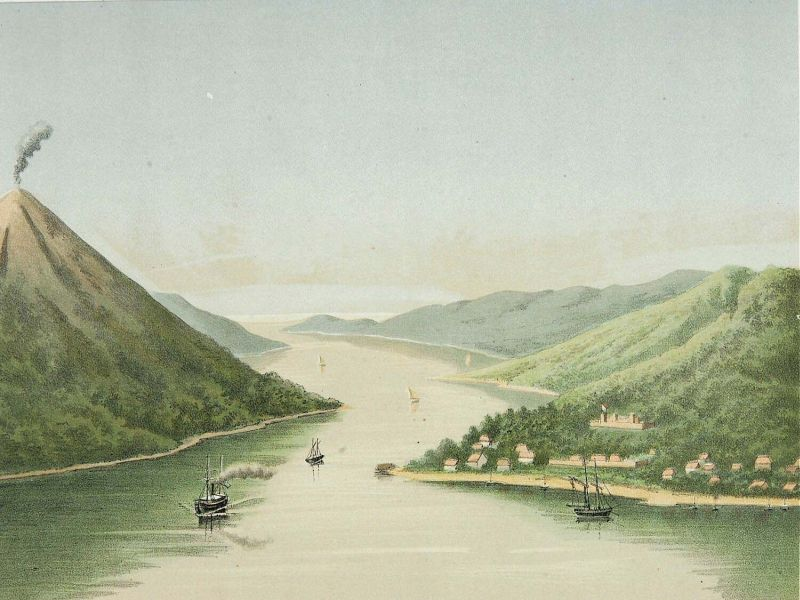
View of Bandanaira (lithograph based on a painting by Josias Cornelis Rappard, 1883-1889)

Josias Cornelis Rappard (24 April 1824, Nijmegen – 17 May 1898, Leiden) was a Dutch soldier and artist. Some of his paintings were made into lithographs and illustrations. He spent time in the Dutch East Indies (Indonesia) and made artworks there.

Rappard's father was Anthony (Antonij) Rappard (1785–1851) and his mother was Cornelia Arnolda Josina de Villeneuve (1792–1860). In 1851 he married in Batavia to Cornelia Nicolina Tromp (1831–1893), they had eight children. Rappard was a colonel in the infantry of the Royal Netherlands East Indies Army. He produced many paintings and drawings of life in Dutch East Indies.

After his return to the Netherlands, he continued to work on his paintings of the Indies. The Royal Tropical Institute in Amsterdam holds many lithographs made in the years 1882–1889 form Rappard's watercolors of Rappard.

== Gallery ==
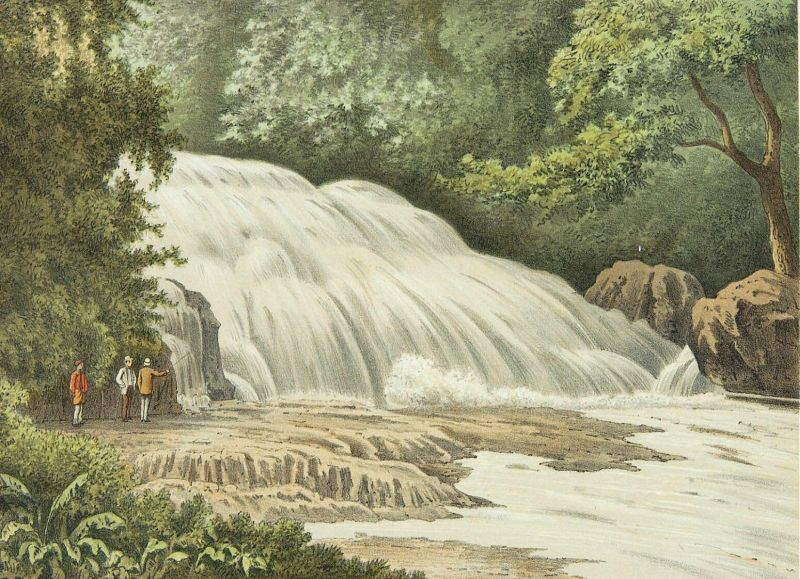
Lithograph of Bantimurung Waterfall in 1883–1889 based on a Josias Cornelis Rappard painting

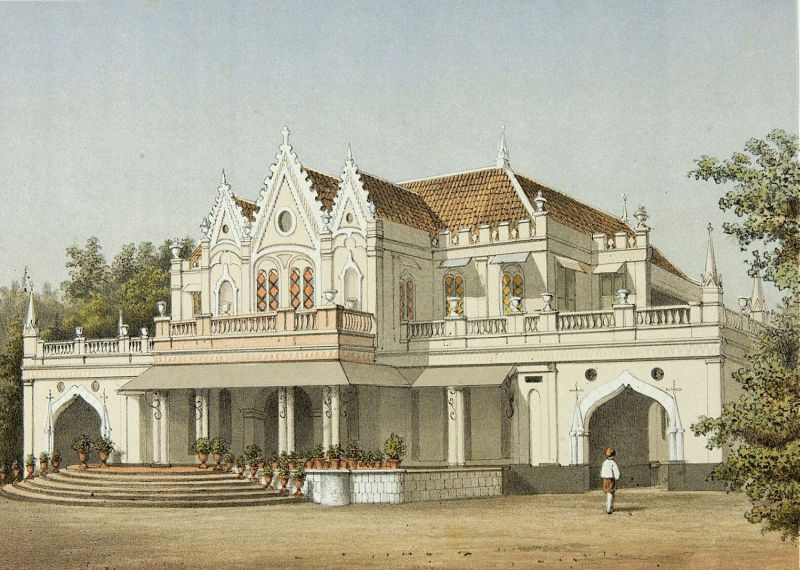
1880s lithograph Raden Saleh's residence (now Cikini Hospital)

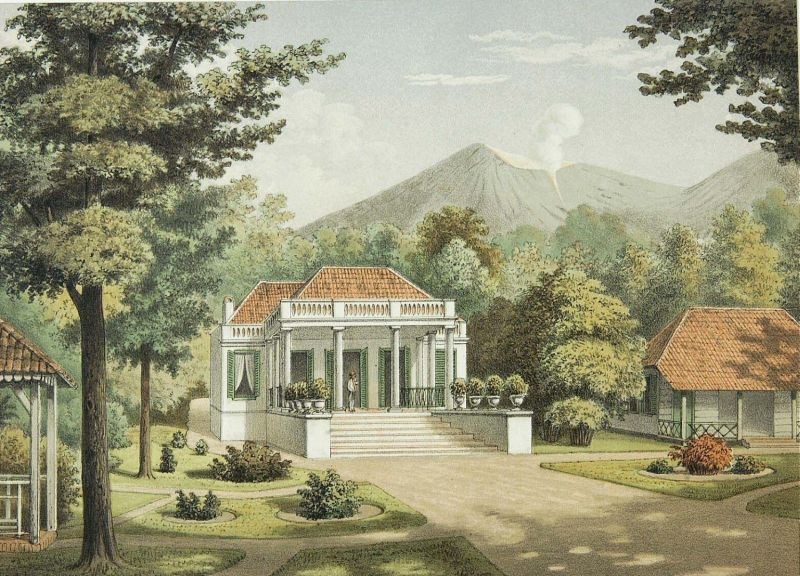
Watercolor lithography of Cipanas Palace, residence of Dutch East Indies Governor-generals (1880)

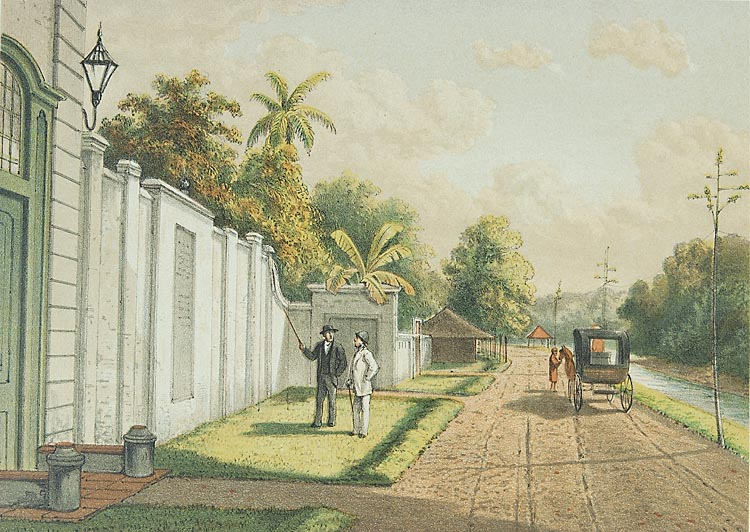
Gedenkteken Pieter Erberveld in Batavia (Jakarta)

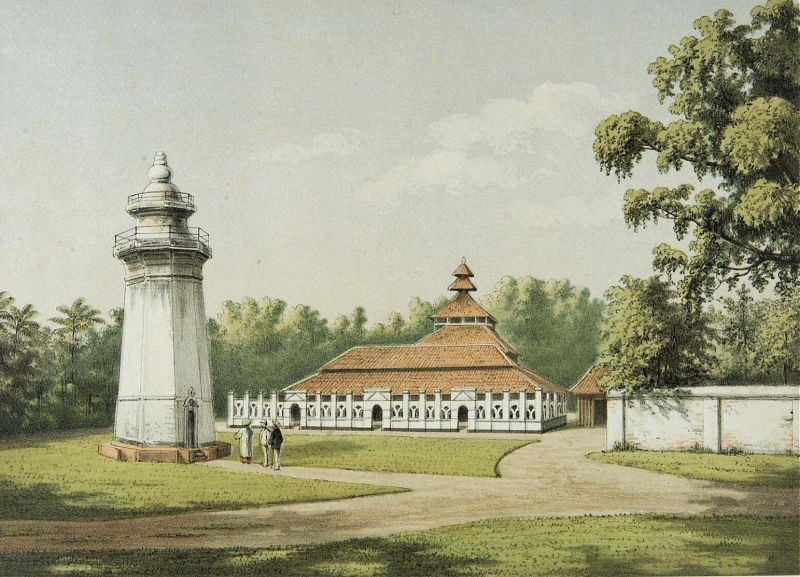
The great mosque of Bantam

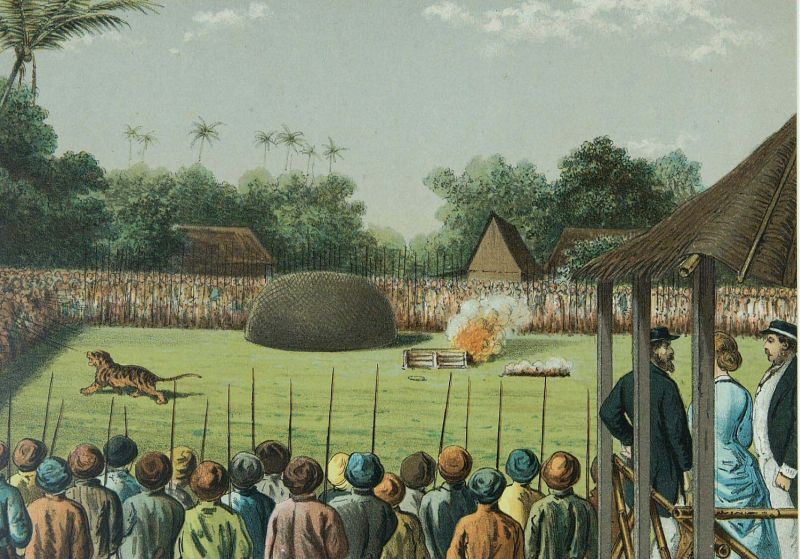
Tiger Fight (rampokan) on Java

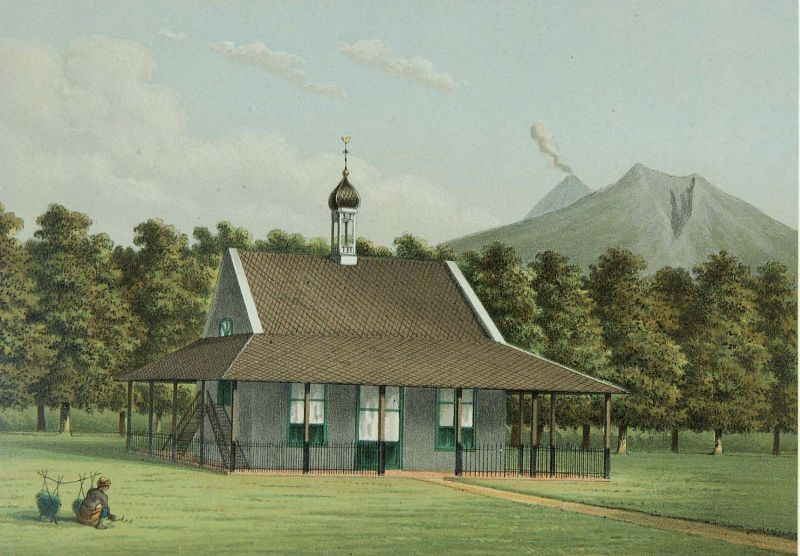
A church in Salatiga, Central Java

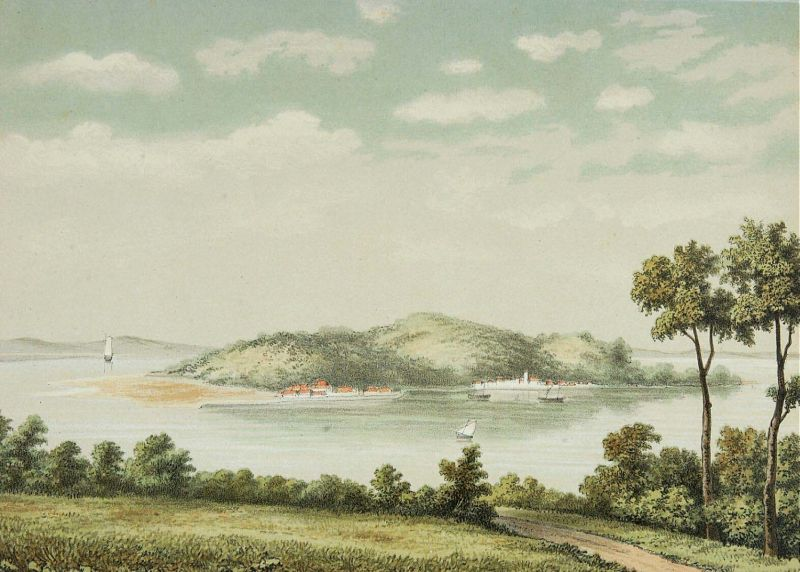
View of Riau in Sumatra, 1880s

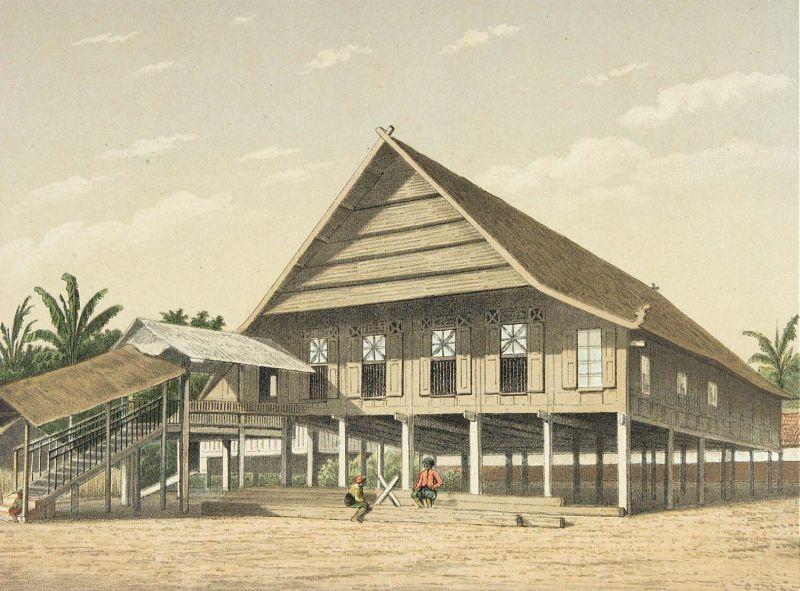
The home of the king of Gowa
