= Tumaritis =

In Sundanese and Javanese wayang, Tumaritis is a place (there is a difference of opinion whether it is a village or country) or a mythological abode of the Punokawan clown-servants. Ward Ki Semar is the doyen of the place. That it is often preceded by Karang, which means "garden" or "place".

Tumaritis considered as an ideal place in which all kinds of people live together in harmony. In addition, people can also coexist with other creatures in there without harming each other.
