= Cipanas, Lebak =

Cipanas
- Town and District
- Location in Java Location in Indonesia
- Coordinates: 6.550580699999999°S 106.35815269999999°E
- Country: Indonesia
- Province: Banten
- Regency: Lebak Regency

Area
  - Total: 64.91 km^{2} (25.06 sq mi)

Population (mid 2023 estimate)
  - Total: 51,689
  - Density: 796.3/km^{2} (2,062/sq mi)
- Time zone: UTC+7 (Indonesia Western Time)
- Postal code: 42372
- Area code: (+62) 252

Cipanas is a village and an administrative district (kecamatan) in Lebak Regency, Banten Province, Indonesia. The district is on the east side of the regency, and is directly adjacent to Jasinga District in Bogor Regency, West Java. It covers an area of 64.91 km^{2}, and had a population of 45,388 at the 2010 Census and 52,378 at the 2020 Census; the official estimate as of mid-2023 was 51,689. The district administrative centre is at Sipayung.

== Villages ==
Cipanas District consists of fourteen villages, all sharing the postcode 42372, namely:

- Bintangresmi
- Bintangsari
- Cipanas
- Giriharja
- Girilaya
- Harumsari
- Haurgajrug
- Jayapura
- Luhurjaya
- Malangsari
- Pasirhaur
- Sipayung
- Sukasari
- Talagahiyang
