= Harry Truman Simanjuntak =

Indonesian archeologist and prehistorian

Harry Truman Simanjuntak (born August 1951) is an Indonesian archaeologist and prehistorian.

== Education ==
Born 27 August 1951 in Pematangsiantar, North Sumatra, he first studied law in Medan and Yogyakarta and received a bachelor's degree in law, but later followed his main interest and earned a bachelor's degree in archaeology in 1979 at Gajah Mada University. His post-graduate studies brought him to the Institut de paléontologie humaine in Paris, where he obtained a master's degree in 1987 and a Ph.D. in 1991.

== Career ==
He worked as a researcher at the Yogyakarta Bureau of Archaeology until 1986. Following his return from Paris, he has worked at the National Research Center for Archaeology from 1992 until present. In 2007, he founded the Center for Prehistory and Austronesian Studies. He was awarded in 2015 with the Sarwono Award of the Indonesian Institute of Sciences.

== Research ==
Truman Simanjuntak engaged in fieldwork in most parts of Indonesia. He studied archaic human remains from the Paleolithic in Java, Sumatra, Kalimantan, Sumba, and the Maluku Islands. He led excavations of the early modern human inhabitants of Indonesia from the Late Paleolithic to the Neolithic, and also studied Megalithic and early Metal Age sites. According to Truman Simanjuntak, the Indonesian archipelago has harbored a wide cultural diversity from prehistorical times until now. Based on archaeological evidence from distinct pottery styles, he proposes a two-way entry of the Neolithic populations of western Indonesia: the Eastern Route Migration from the northeast, connected to the Austronesian expansion, and the Western Route Migration from the northwest from Mainland Southeast Asia. This two-fold origin is also corroborated by archaeogenetic evidence.
