= Cipanas, Cipanas, Lebak =

Cipanas
- Village
- Location in Java Location in Indonesia
- Coordinates: 6.550239400000001°S 106.3985857°E
- Country: Indonesia
- Province: Banten
- Regency: Lebak Regency
- District: Cipanas

Area
  - Total: 5.33 km^{2} (2.06 sq mi)

Population (2017)
  - Total: 4.236
  - Density: 795/km^{2} (2,060/sq mi)
- Time zone: UTC+7 (Indonesia Western Time)
- Postal code: 42372
- Area code: (+62) 252
- Vehicle registration: A

Cipanas is a village in Cipanas, Lebak Regency, Banten, Indonesia. On 2017 the population of the village is 4.236.
