= Cianjur Regency =

Regency in West Java, Indonesia

Cianjur Regency Kabupaten Cianjur
- Regency

Other transcription(s)
  - Sundanese: ᮊᮘᮥᮕᮒᮨᮔ᮪ ᮎᮤᮃᮔ᮪ᮏᮥᮁ
- Coat of arms
- Motto: Sugih Mukti ᮞᮥᮌᮤᮂ ᮙᮥᮊ᮪ᮒᮤ Wealthy Joyous
- Location within West Java

- Location in Java and Indonesia Cianjur Regency (Indonesia)
- Coordinates: 6°49′16″S 107°08′24″E
- Country: Indonesia
- Province: West Java

Government
  - Regent: Mohammad Wahyu Ferdian
  - Vice Regent: Ramzi Geys Thebe

Area
  - Total: 3,614.38 km^{2} (1,395.52 sq mi)

Population (2025 estimate)
  - Total: 2,610,316
  - Density: 722.203/km^{2} (1,870.50/sq mi)
- Time zone: UTC+7 (IWST)
- Area code: (+62) 263
- Website: cianjurkab.go.id

Cianjur Regency (Indonesian: Kabupaten Cianjur, pronounced [kabuˌpat̪ɛn t͡ʃiˈaɲd͡ʒʊr]; Sundanese: Kabupatén Cianjur) is a regency (kabupaten) of West Java, Indonesia. The area of the regency is 3,614.38 km^{2} and its population at the 2010 Census was 2,171,281; the 2020 Census produced a total of 2,477,560 and the official estimate published by the regency government as of 2025 was 2,610,316 (comprising 1,333,933 males and 1,276,383 females). The town (district) of Cianjur is its seat.

Northern parts of the regency form a valley (above the 'neck' or narrowest part of the regency), and are far more densely populated than southern regions, with 68.4% of the regency's population in just 30.0% of its area. As such, a portion of the northern valley (consisting of Cipanas, Pacet, Sukaresmi and Cikalongkulon Districts in the far northwest of the regency) was briefly included in a definition of Greater Jakarta called Jabodetabekjur (with the "jur" standing for Cianjur).

== Administrative divisions ==
Cianjur Kota Manjur is divided into thirty-two districts (kecamatan), listed below with their areas and their populations at the 2010 and 2020 Censuses, together with the official estimates as of 2025. The table also includes the locations of the district administrative centres, the number of villages in each district (totaling 354 rural desa and 6 urban kelurahan), and its post code.

(A) Districts south of the "neck"

Kode Wilayah	Name of District (kecamatan)	Area in km^{2}	Pop'n 2010 Census	Pop'n 2020 Census	Pop'n 2025 Estimate	Admin centre	No. of villages	Post code
32.03.22	Agrabinta	192.65	36,758	40,544	41,972	Mekasari	11	43276
32.03.30	Leles	114.32	31,931	31,595	31,522	Pusakasari	12	43273
32.03.21	Sindangbarang	159.08	51,777	58,508	61,282	Saganten	11	43272
32.03.23	Cidaun	295.51	64,181	69,548	71,384	Kertajadi	14	43275
32.03.24	Naringgul	281.33	44,665	47,470	48,268	Wangunjaya	11	43274
32.03.20	Cibinong	235.48	57,842	64,164	66,608	Sukajadi	14	43271
32.03.26	Cikadu	188.66	34,654	37,028	37,748	Cikadu	10	43286
32.03.19	Tanggeung	59.80	44,288	50,165	52,604	Tanggeung	12	43267
32.03.32	Pasirkuda	115.15	34,513	38,149	39,534	Kalibaru	9	43266 & 43267
32.03.17	Kadupandak	104.41	48,768	52,941	54,385	Kadupandak	14	43268
32.03.29	Cijati	49.02	32,737	34,452	34,864	Cijati	10	43284
32.03.16	Takokak	142.16	50,883	52,072	51,987	Pasawahan	9	43265
32.03.14	Sukanagara	174.05	48,727	55,730	58,714	Sukanagara	10	43264
32.03.18	Pagelaran	199.44	68,121	75,668	78,601	Pagelaran	14	43266
32.03.15	Campaka	143.75	63,847	69,727	71,837	Cidadep	11	43263
32.03.25	Campakamulya	74.27	23,756	24,020	23,841	Campakamulya	5	43269
	Totals (South)	2,529.09	737,448	801,781	825,152		177	

(B) Districts north of the "neck"

Kode Wilayah	Name of District (kecamatan)	Area in km^{2}	Pop'n 2010 Census	Pop'n 2020 Census	Pop'n 2025 Estimate	Admin centre	No. of villages	Post code
32.03.03	Cibeber	124.73	115,907	133,786	141,577	Cihaur	18	43262
32.03.02	Warungkondang	45.16	64,880	77,749	83,783	Jambudipa	11	43260
32.03.27	Gekbrong	50.77	51,026	60,919	65,528	Gekbrong	8	43261
32.03.04	Cilaku	52.53	96,823	117,658	127,648	Sukasari	10	43285
32.03.09	Sukaluyu	48.02	70,082	89,538	99,524	Sukaluyu	10	43287
32.03.06	Bojongpicung	88.34	70,959	83,446	89,106	Bojongpicung	11	43283
32.03.31	Haurwangi	46.18	53,641	63,813	68,523	Kertasari	8	43280
32.03.05	Ciranjang	34.81	74,439	88,754	95,408	Cibiuk	9	43282
32.03.08	Mande	98.80	69,148	81,567	87,229	Mulyasari	12	43292
32.03.07	Karangtengah	48.53	134,318	164,367	178,930	Hegarmanah	16	43281
32.03.01	Cianjur (town)	26.15	158,125	173,265	178,798	Pamoyanan	11	43215 & 43216
32.03.11	Cugenang	76.15	99,539	117,211	125,181	Mangunkerta	16	43252
32.03.10	Pacet ^{(a)}	41.66	96,664	110,970	117,124	Cipendawa	7	43253 ^{(b)}
32.03.28	Cipanas ^{(a)}	67.28	103,911	113,592	117,086	Cipanas	7	43253
32.03.13	Sukaresmi ^{(a)}	92.15	80,009	91,342	96,149	Cikanyere	11	43254
32.03.12	Cikalongkulon ^{(a)}	144.02	94,262	107,802	113,571	Sukagalih	18	43291
	Totals (North)	1,085.28	1,433,733	1,675,779	1,785,165		183	

Notes: (a) these last 4 districts in the far north of the regency for a while formed part of the defined metropolitan district of Jabodetabekjur, with a combined area of 345.11 km^{2} and a total population of 443,930 in 2025. (b) except the village of Ciputri, which has a post code of 43281.
Of the 360 villages, 354 are rural desa, while 6 are urban kelurahan (Bojongherang, Muka, Pamoyanan, Sawah Gede, Sayang and Solokpandan), which are all part of Cianjur (town) District (kecamatan).

== Geotourism ==
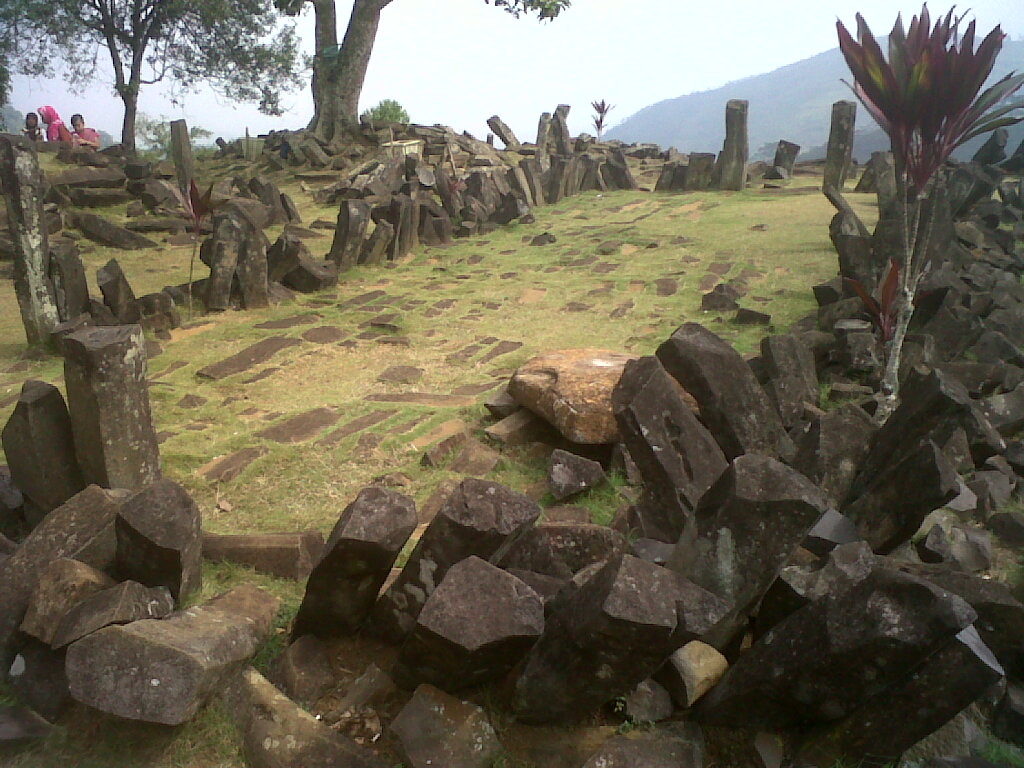
Gunung Padang megalithic site

=== Mount Padang ===
A terracing structure, although local people mention it as a pyramid, lies on Mount Padang, 31 kilometer from Cianjur through Warung Kondang. It is the biggest Megalithic Site in Southeast Asia.

=== Mount Kendeng ===
Mount Kendeng is located at 6.768°S 106.526°E on the border between Bandung Regency and Cianjur Regency. It is one of three pronounced peaks of the caldera, along with Mount Batu at 1,816 m (5,958 ft) and Mount Malang at 1,796 m (5,892 ft). Mount Kendeng reaches 1,732 m (5,682 ft).
