= Paula Rumokoy =

Indonesian actress, model and dancer (1949–1993)

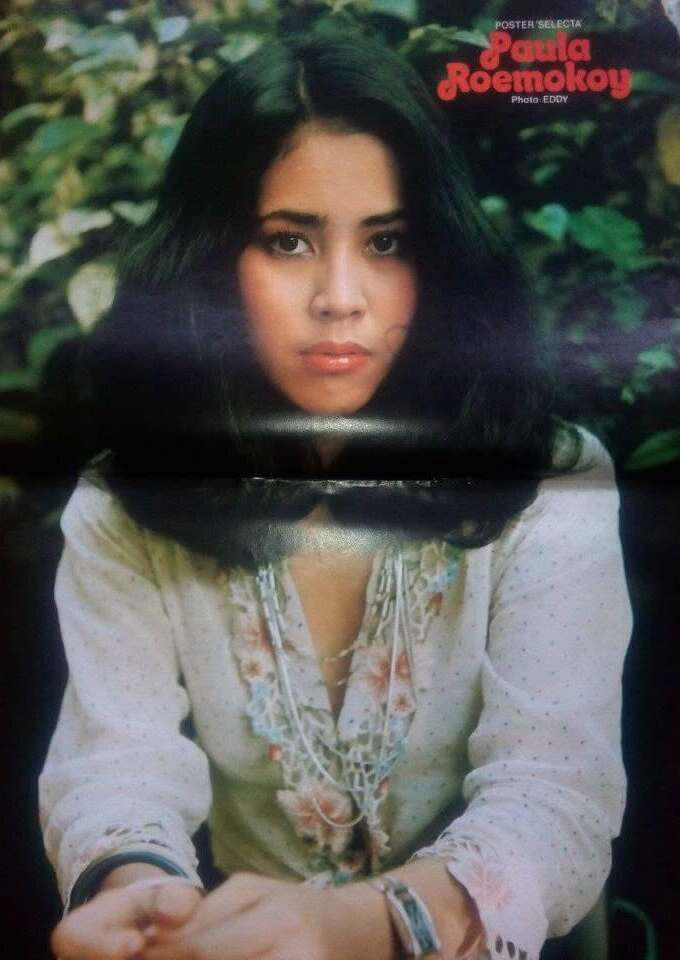
- Rumokoy on the poster of Selecta 1974
- Born: 17 April 1949; North Minahasa Regency, North Sulawesi, Indonesia
- Died: 16 January 1993 (aged 43); Jakarta, Indonesia
- Burial place: Tanah Kusir Cemetery
- Occupations: Actress; model; dancer
- Years active: 1968–1981
- Spouses: Bobby Suhadirman (m. 1970; div. 1973); Wim Umboh (m. 1974; div. 1982); Adiwarsita Adinegoro
- Children: 3
- Relatives: Djamaluddin Adinegoro (father-in-law)

Paula Rumokoy (17 April 1949 – 16 January 1993) was an Indonesian actress, model and dancer. She earned the nickname of "most popular Indonesian star" in the 1970s.

== Early life ==
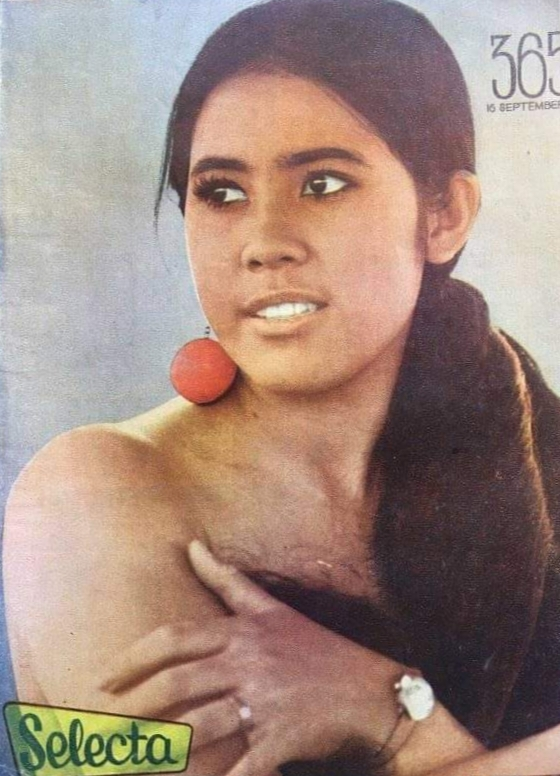
Rumokoy on the cover of Selecta, 16 September 1968

Rumokoy was born on 17 April 1949 in Tumaluntung, a village in Kauditan, North Minahasa Regency. She had a Spanish ancestry. Rumokoy spent her childhood in Amurang, South Minahasa. After graduated from high school, she started her careers as a catwalk model in Manado.

== Personal life ==
=== Marriages, relationships, and children ===
Rumokoy was first married to Bobby Suhardiman, a politician and the son of General Suhardiman, on 3 December 1970. They had a daughter, Yasmina Mesguita Mathilda (born 1971), and later divorced on 6 December 1973. She later married for a second time to Wim Umboh, a director, after starring in Dikejar Dosa (1974), on 23 May 1974. They have known each other since the filming of Dan Bunga-Bunga Berguguran (1970), which was directed by Umboh and rose Rumokoy to fame. Her rejection towards Umboh after the filming made him hostile towards her and even said that he would not use her again for his films. They became a couple who have been frequently discussed by various newspapers and entertainment magazines for a long time. Rumokoy married for a third times to Adiwarsita Adinegoro and has had two sons. Their marriage lasted until Rumokoy's death in January 1993.

=== Illness and death ===
Rumokoy was suffered from a lung cancer for two years and according to her family members, she then seeking a treatment to the United States and Singapore. She died at her residence in DI Panjaitan Street Number 65, Cipinang Cempedak, on 16 January 1993 around 16:30 PM due to the illness at the age of 43, and was buried in Karet Bivak Cemetery on 17 January.

== Career ==
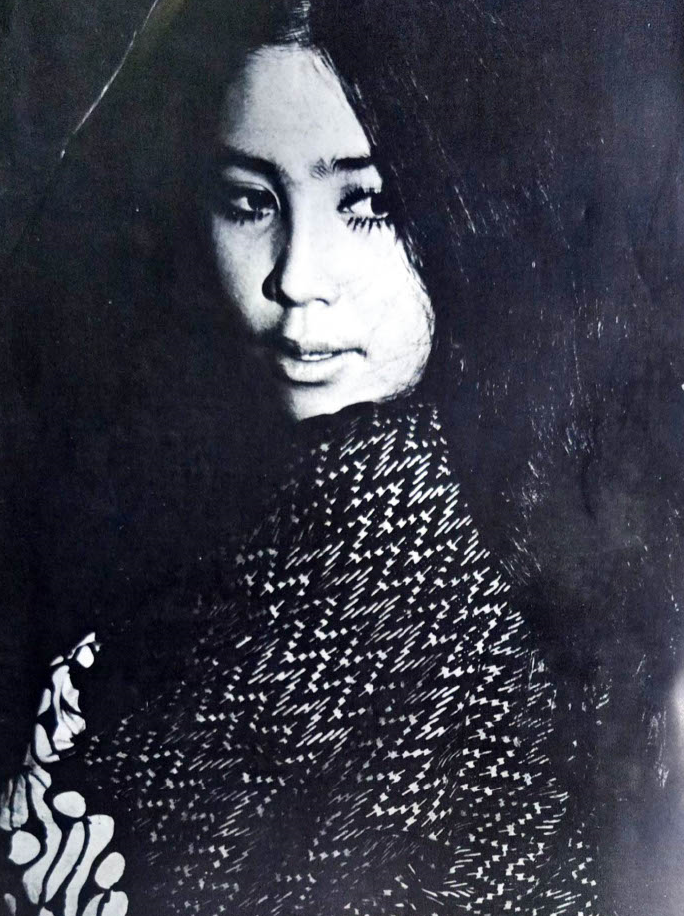
Rumokoy in 1972

Rumokoy's first film appearance was a supporting role in Djakarta-Hongkong-Macao (1968), after winning the Manado tourism queen contest in the same year. She again played supporting roles in her next two films Laki-laki Tak Bernama (1969) and Apa Jang Kau Tjari, Palupi? (1969). Rumokoy then joined Eka Quarta Dance, a dance troupe led by Rima Melati in Jakarta. During this period, she lived with Melati in her house at Wahid Hasyim Street in Central Jakarta.

After Laki-laki Tak Bernama was successful at the box office, director Wim Umboh asked Rumokoy to star in his next film, Dan Bunga-bunga Berguguran. The film was released in 1970, raising Rumokoy's name as an actress. She also earned a good response from film critics for bravely doing a bikini scene which at that time was considered taboo in Indonesian film industry.

== Filmography ==
During her thirteen-year career, Rumokoy acted in twenty-seven films. She was also a costume and set designer for two films.

=== Cast ===
- Djakarta-Hongkong-Macao (1968)
- Laki-Laki Tak Bernama (1969)
- Apa Jang Kau Tjari, Palupi? (1969)
- Dan Bunga-bunga Berguguran (1970)
- Si Pitung (1970)
- Tjinta di Batas Peron (1971)
- Rakit (1971)
- Brandal-Brandal Metropolitan (1971)
- Banteng Betawi (1971)
- Wajah Seorang Pembunuh (1972)
- Di Antara Anggrek Berbunga (1972)
- Dendam Si Anak Haram (1972)
- Si Bongkok (1972)
- Selamat Tinggal Kekasih (1972)
- The Angry Man (1972)
- Merintis Djalan Ke Sorga (1972)
- The Great Lover (1973)
- Ayah (1973)
- Jangan Kau Tangisi (1974)
- Dikejar Dosa (1974)
- Gersang Tapi Damai (1977)
- Petualang-Petualang (1977)
- Petualang Cinta (1978)
- Ratapan Anak Tiri II (1980)
- Hidup Tanpa Kehormatan (1981)

=== Crew ===
- Sesuatu yang Indah (1976)
- Kembang-Kembang Plastik (1977)

== Awards ==
Year	Award	Category	Subject	Result	Ref.
1975	Indonesian Journalists Association	Best Actress	Dikejar Dosa	Nominated	
