= Nurnaningsih =

Indonesian actress

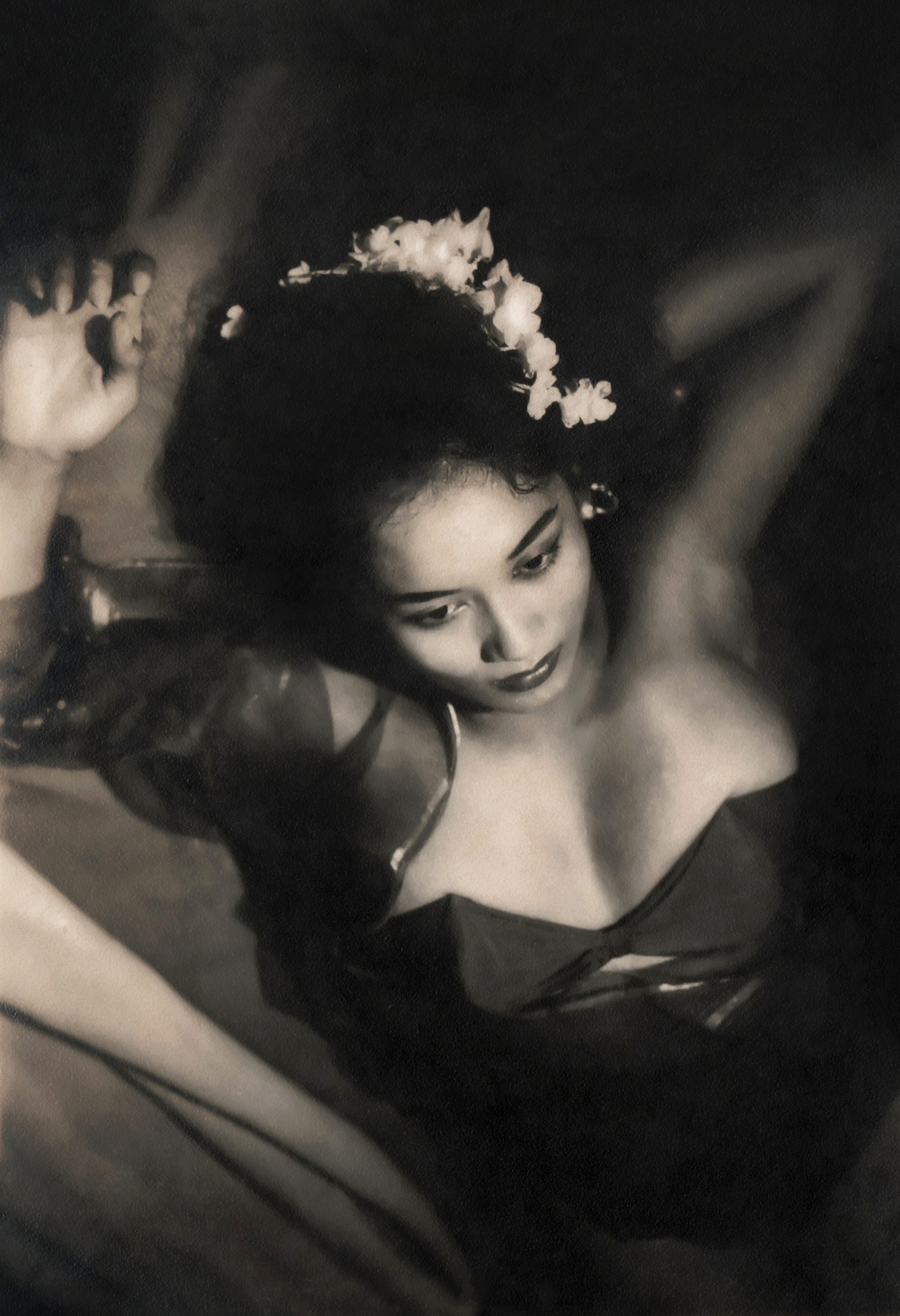
- Nurnaningsih in 1955
- Born: 5 December 1925; Surabaya, Dutch East Indies
- Died: 21 March 2004 (aged 78); Jakarta, Indonesia
- Resting place: Menteng Pulo War Cemetery
- Occupations: Actress; teacher; painter
- Years active: 1953–1988
- Spouses: Kartono Yudhokusomo (m. 1945; div. 1952) Basir Ibrahim (m. 1955, divorced) Yan Karel Thomas (divorced)
- Children: 4

Raden Nganten Nurnaningsih (5 December 1925 – 21 March 2004) was an Indonesian actress. She has been described as Indonesia's first sex bomb. She was the part of Classical Indonesian cinema.

== Biography ==
Nurnaningsih was born on 5 December 1925, at Darmo Hospital in Surabaya, Indonesia, to Raden Nganten Soekini Martindjung and Raden Kadjat Kartodarmodjo. She was the second child from the eighth children, her brothers were Hernoko, Daryono and Prawito. While her sisters were Nurpeni, Nurkeni, Nureti, and Nurbarti. Her father was the descendant of Sultan Agung of Mataram, while her mother was the descendant of Prabu Brawijaya V. Nurnaningsih dropped out of school in the first year of senior high school. She migrated to Jakarta at the age of 25 and residing in a hut near Ciliwung River.

Nurnaningsih made her feature film debut in 1953 with Usmar Ismail's Krisis (Crisis) as leading lady Ros but only got paid for Rp. 180. The comedy was the most successful film since Terang Boelan in 1937. In D. Djajakusuma's 1954 film Harimau Tjampa (Tiger from Tjampa) she appeared half-nude, making her the first native Indonesian actress in such a role. This occurred during a period of contention between artists and the censorship board. She later told the press: "I am not ruining art. I'm breaking away the old views of art that are still held in Indonesia." (Note: Original: "Saya tidak akan memerosotkan kesenian, melainkan hendak melenyapkan pandangan-pandangan kolot yang masih terdapat dalam kesenian Indonesia.") She released another film, Klenting Kuning, later that year.

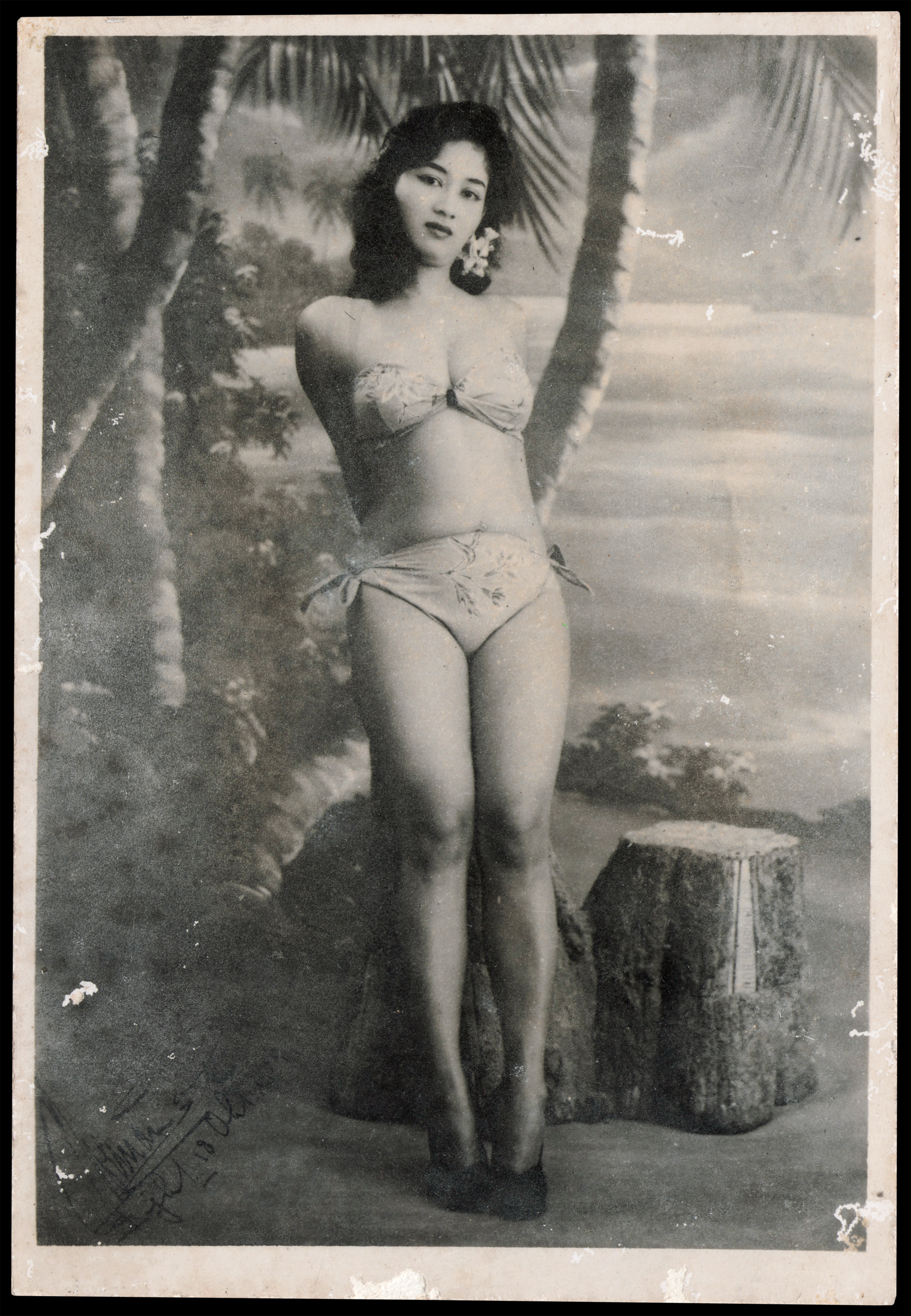
Nurnaningsih in bikini, which then earned her criticism and controversy in mid-1954

In mid-1954 nude pictures of Nurnaningsih by an unknown photographer began circulating in Jakarta. This resulted in her being brought in for questioning by the Jakarta police in early October, while the prosecutor's office also expressed an interest in the case. The general populace was outraged at the pictures, which they considered to be against Eastern values, and Nurnaningsih's films were boycotted in East Kalimantan. She released one film in 1955, Kebun Binatang (Zoo), before disappearing from the spotlight.

Nurnaningsih wandered the Indonesian archipelago for twelve years, taking odd jobs as a sketch artist, stage performer, English and Dutch language teacher, seamstress, pianist, singer, and – for six years – a football goalkeeper. She returned to film in 1968 with a bit part in Djakarta, Hongkong, Macao. After several more bit parts, she headlined in Seribu Janji Kumenanti (A Thousand Promises I Await) in 1972. She continued taking roles in the 1980s.

== Personal life ==
Nurnaningsih practiced Evangelical Christianity, she was married and divorced twelve times. Nurnaningsih was first married to painter artist Kartono Yudhokusumo in 1945, at the age of 18. They had two children named Karti Yudaningsih and Raden Julius Hargowo Bintoro. After they divorced in 1952, Nurnaningsih married for second time in April 1955 to a former lieutenant named Basir Ibrahim. They had a daughter named Maria Nina Zunaria. The couple were divorced one year after their daughter was born. During an interview, Nurnaningsih said her second husband motive for marrying her is nothing more than just wanted to taking advantage of her popularity. During her trip to Ternate, she met and married her third husband Yan Karel Thomas, they divorced. After the divorce, Nurnaningsih gave birth to her youngest son Yanto Ganggono, She is also had been gifted a house by President Sukarno.

Nurnaningsih said she was inspired to become a movie star when she saw a movie starring Roekiah, at the age of 14.

=== Illness and death ===
By the end of the 1990s, Nurnaningsih suffered from paralysis and diabetes mellitus. She died at her daughter's residence in Tebet, South Jakarta, on 21 March 2004, at the age of 78, and was buried at Menteng Pulo War Cemetery.

== Legacy ==
Nurnaningsih remained as Marilyn Monroe of Indonesia and her popularity spread to the United States and Italy.

== Filmography ==
- Tjemburu (Jealous; 1953)
- Krisis (Crisis; 1953)
- Harimau Tjampa (Tiger from Tjampa; 1954)
- Klenting Kuning (1954)
- Kebun Binatang (Zoo; 1955)
- Djakarta, Hongkong, Macao (1968)
- Orang Orang Liar (Wild People; 1969)
- Bernafas Dalam Lumpur (Breathing in the Mud; 1970)
- Derita Tiada Achir (Unending Sorrow; 1971)
- Samtidar (1972)
- Seribu Janji Kumenanti (A Thousand Promises I Await; 1972)
- Kembang-Kembang Plastik (Plastic Flowers; 1977)
- Donat Pahlawan Pandir (Donut of the Silly Hero; 1978)
- Bayang-Bayang Kelabu (Dark Shadows; 1979)
- Remang-Remang Jakarta (Dimness of Jakarta; 1981)
- Malam Satu Suro (The Night of One Suro; 1988)
