= Ancol War Cemetery =

Dutch war cemetery in Jakarta, Indonesia

Dutch Field of Honor Ancol
- Nederlands Ereveld Ancol; Makam Kehormatan Belanda di Ancol
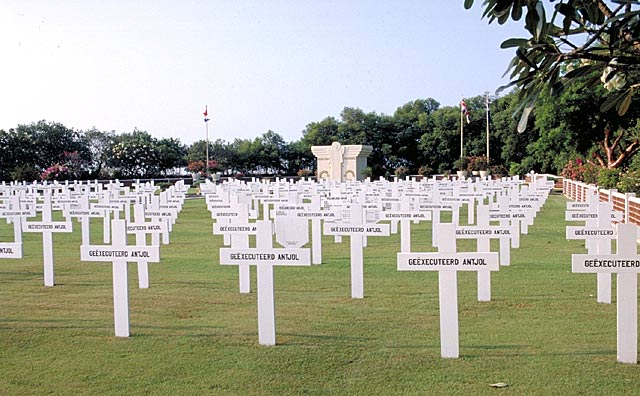
- Ancol War Cemetery
- Interactive map of Dutch Field of Honor Ancol

Details
- Location: Ancol, Jakarta
- Country: Indonesia
- Coordinates: 6°07′07″S 106°51′17″E
- Type: War cemetery
- Owned by: Netherlands War Graves Foundation
- No. of graves: Over 2,000

Ancol War Cemetery, also Dutch Field of Honor Ancol (Dutch: Nederlands Ereveld Ancol, Indonesian: Makam Kehormatan Belanda di Ancol), is a war cemetery in Ancol, Jakarta, in Indonesia. It is one of two Dutch war cemeteries in Jakarta, the other being Menteng Pulo War Cemetery in Tebet. The cemetery was inaugurated on 14 September 1946. More than 2,000 victims of the Pacific War are buried here, including 1,328 members of the resistance against the Japanese occupation of the Dutch East Indies.

== History ==
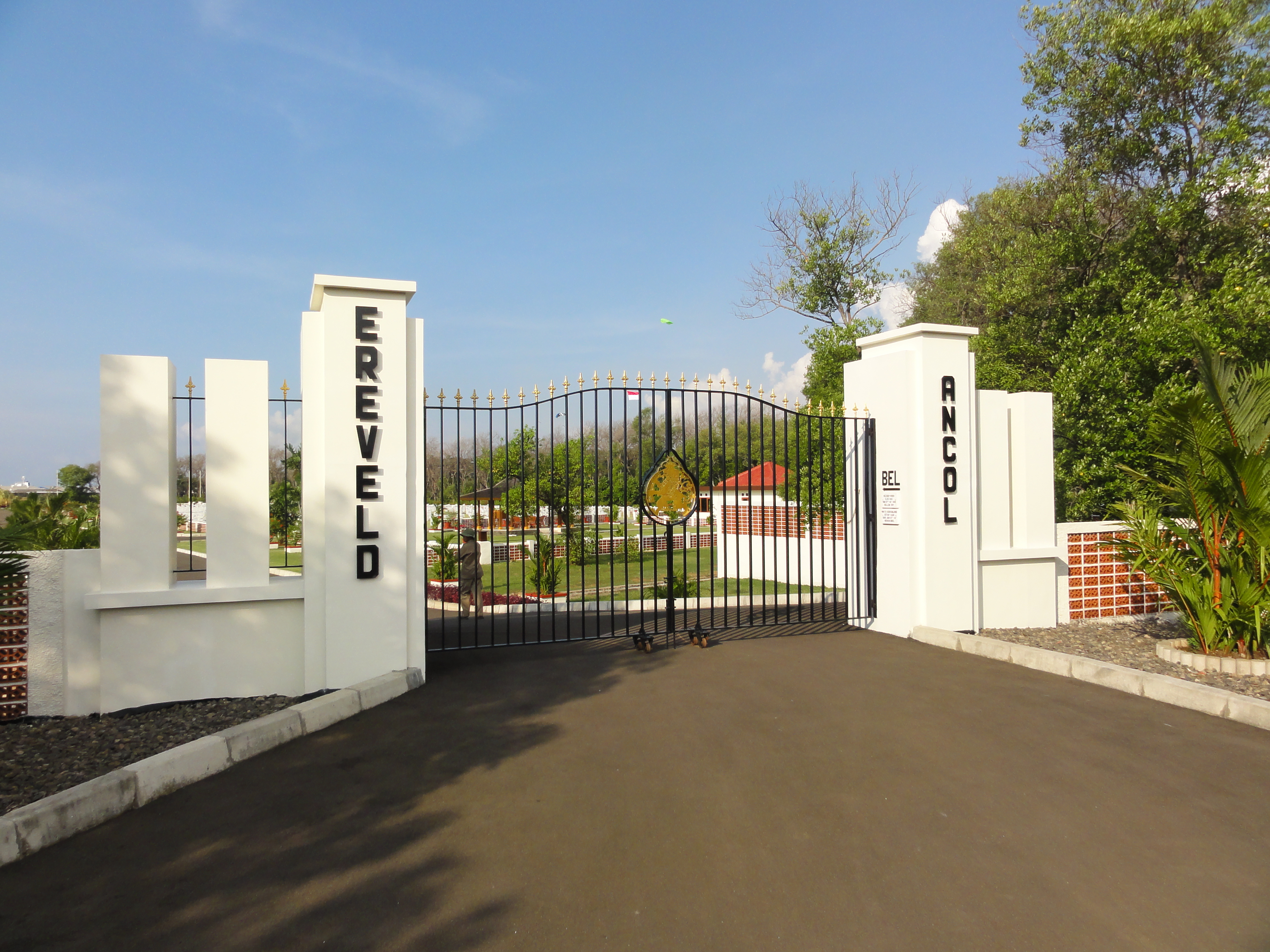
Entrance gate to Ancol War Cemetery, August 2010

After the surrender of Japan on 15 August 1945 – during the period of temporary British military administration of the Dutch East Indies – the Dutch Temporaire Krijgsraden (English: Provisional Courts-Martial) launched investigations into Japanese war crimes in the Indonesian archipelago, in particular those committed by the Kempeitai. It would be several months before investigators looked into Ancol (spelled Antjol before the 1972 orthography reform), a swampy area that had been used as a field of execution and mass grave by the Japanese occupiers. When personnel of the Graves Service of the Royal Netherlands Army first visited the site in June 1946, a rudimentary cement gravestone topped by a wooden cross stood on a neglected piece of land. On the stone was a simple inscription in Japanese, translating to "cemetery – deceased". In preparation of the trials against the staff of the Kempeitai headquarters in Batavia, some of the accused were transferred from prison to Ancol and interrogated on-site by a special committee.

The extracted statements remained limited to summary information: between 400 and 600 executed prisoners had allegedly been buried near the cement stone. In a stroke of luck, the elderly and deaf-mute guardian of an old Chinese temple was able to provide important information and pointed out the locations of many executions. On his instructions, excavations were carried out in the presence of the investigators. Single and communal graves were found throughout the area. In the following months, the extent of the burial ground was established. The site was cleared and the remains carefully collected and identified as much as possible. The ground was then leveled, raised and drained before reburials took place. A temporary wooden monument was placed where the cement gravestone had been, with an inscription in Dutch translating to "Their spirit has conquered, 1942–1945". On 14 September 1946, the cemetery was inaugurated, the first in the southwest Pacific to be constructed by the Royal Netherlands Army Graves Service.

== Inauguration ==
(in Dutch) Newsreel showing the arrival of the three-man Commission-General for the Dutch East Indies in Batavia and the inauguration ceremony at Ancol, September 1946

A grand and emotional tribute to the memory of those executed then took place. The Dutch flag was draped over the monument, the gravestones were decorated with palm branches, and rose petals were spread on all the graves. Many civilians from different countries, as well as soldiers, were lined up around the monument. A number of dignitaries attended the ceremony, including H.J. van Mook (the Lieutenant Governor-General of the Dutch East Indies), Lt. Gen. S. Spoor, V. Adm. A.S. Pinke, Gen. E.C. Mansergh (the British Commander-in-Chief of Allied Forces, Netherlands East Indies), and consular representatives of the United States, France and China. The tribute was preceded by a prayer service by P.J. Willekens, the Apostolic Vicar of Batavia. After this ceremony, an honorary salute was given by units of the Royal Netherlands Navy, the Royal Netherlands Army, and the Royal Netherlands East Indies Army. During the oppressive moment when the Dutch flag was lowered to half-mast, the military band played Chopin's Marche funèbre. After this, Van Mook gave a short speech and said, among other things:

We commemorate the people who, under the most impossible and discouraging circumstances, persevered in the struggle for their country and more than for their country: for humanity and for freedom and who paid for that struggle with the highest sacrifice they could make. We do not know their number; there are many, more than are buried here, because they did not only die here, after a parody of justice, which the enemy always needed to assuage his bad conscience. They died in many places in this archipelago and outside this archipelago. They were executed, sometimes tortured to death, sometimes killed in battle, when they were finally able to obtain weapons. But they all died for the same purpose: for the restoration of freedom and humanity.

== Later events ==
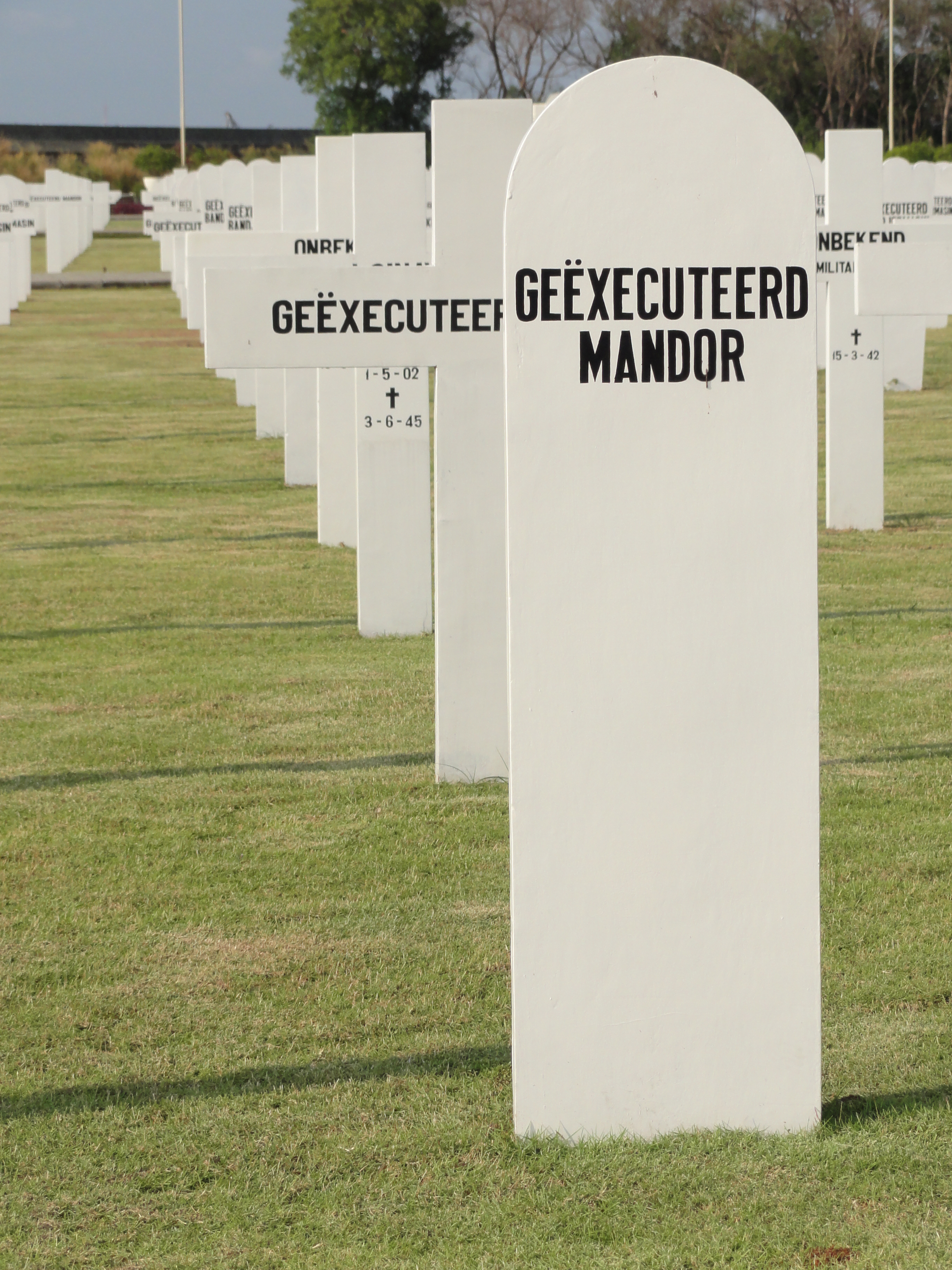
Gravestones at Ancol War Cemetery, August 2010

On Ancol War Cemetery stood a tree with a convex crown that came to be referred to as the "tree-of-heaven", as its shape made it seem as if the tree were raising its arms to heaven and uttering a cry of horror. This Ailanthus excelsa seemed to show a gesture of desperation and, according to the deaf-mute guardian of the Chinese temple, a number of women had been executed under this tree. After some time, the tree died off and a rescue operation was mounted by the then-director of the Netherlands War Graves Foundation R. Smagge, his wife, and a team of experts. They found that the roots of the old tree appeared to have sprouted a shoot, symbolizing to them the past, the present, and a succeeding generation. The old tree was impregnated in a special way by employees of the foundation and stripped of the dead bark. A copper plate was then affixed to the concrete collar that was placed around the tree, inscribed with a few lines from the poem For the Fallen by Laurence Binyon:

They went with songs to the battle, they were young,
Straight of limb, true of eye, steady and aglow.
They were staunch to the end against odds uncounted:
They fell with their faces to the foe.

They shall grow not old, as we that are left grow old:
Age shall not weary them, nor the years condemn.
At the going down of the sun and in the morning
We will remember them.

Ancol, 1942–1945

A semi-circular meditation bench was built around the tree. All victims buried in the cemetery at Ancol have in common that they were summarily executed following betrayal or after a show trial and torture. About 850 people visit the site annually. Ancol War Cemetery continues to be managed by the Netherlands War Graves Foundation.

== Notable burials ==
Today, more than 2,000 people are buried in the cemetery. A large number of them remain unnamed in communal graves because they could not be identified. In later years, war victims from across Indonesia were reburied at Ancol. Between 1946 and 1950, 22 Dutch war cemeteries had been constructed throughout the archipelago. At the request of the Indonesian government, however, the number of cemeteries was reduced to seven in the 1960s. Notable burials and reburials at Ancol include:

- Maj. Gen. R.T. Overakker (1890–1945)
- Col. G.F.V. Godenson (1888–1945)
- Cpt. R.G. de Lange (1896–1943)
- Cpt. L.A. Vellenga (1901–1943)
- Lt. J. Davijt (1916–1942)
- Lt. E.V.F. Toers Bijns (1908–1944)
- Lt. H. van Zanten (1918–1943)
- Res. Cpt. A.L.J. Wernink (1917–1944)
- Res. Lt. L.J. Welter (1910–1943)
- Controleur H. Jongbloed (1905–1942)
- Prof. Dr. A. Mochtar (1890–1945)
- those involved in the Hilgers affair
- 18 employees of the Algemeen Landbouw Syndicaat
