= Rajuan Alam =

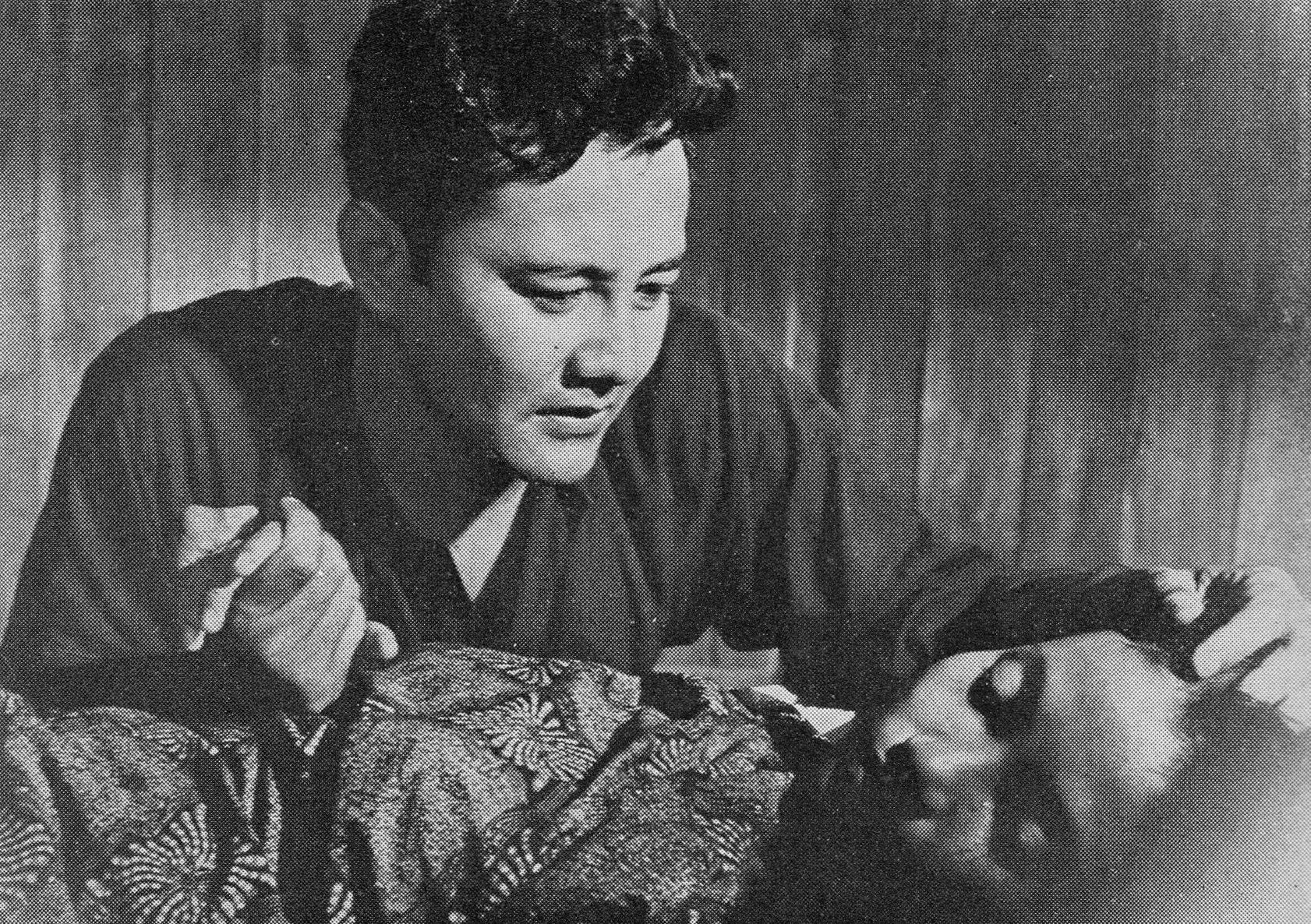
- Stars Bambang Hermanto and Lies Noor in a scene from the film
- Directed by: Miriam Bucher
- Written by: Padma T Astradiningrat
- Starring: Bambang Hermanto; Lies Noor
- Cinematography: Lie Gie San; Bert Sarodjo
- Edited by: G Sarono; B Supardi
- Music by: Bernard Ijzerdraat; Sukiman
- Production companies: Produksi Film Negara; United States Information Service
- Release date: 1956 (Indonesia)
- Countries: Indonesia; United States
- Languages: Indonesian; English

Rajuan Alam (Perfected Spelling: Rayuan Alam, released internationally as A House, a Wife, a Singing Bird) is a 1956 semi-documentary directed by Miriam Bucher and starring Bambang Hermanto and Lies Noor.

== Plot ==
Amin (Bambang Hermanto), a village youth, attempts to earn a living in the city. However, he is unsuccessful, and thus he returns to the village to live with his wife, Marlina (Lies Noor). Before they can marry, however, Marlina falls ill with malaria. When she is cured, they are able to marry.

== Production ==
Rajuan Alam was written by Padma T Astradiningrat and directed by Miriam Bucher as a joint production of Produksi Film Negara (PFN) and the United States Information Service (USIS). The film was shot in Eastmancolor by cameramen Lie Gie San and Bert Sarodjo, making it the first PFN production to be shot in colour. Scenes for the film were shot in Surakarta and Salatiga, and dialogue was recorded in both Indonesian and English.

Rajuan Alam starred Bambang Hermanto and Lies Noor. It also featured Rd Ismail as Marlina's father, as well as Boes Boestami, Ali Yugo, Chaidar Djafar, Tb Sanusi, and Pranadjaja. Editing was handled by G Sarono and B Supardi, with artistic design provided by HB Angin. Sound was recorded by Dick Ninkeula and Sudjito, and the film was scored by Bernard Ijzerdraat and Sukiman. The twenty-six minute film was intended as a semi-documentary about efforts to combat malaria.

== Release and reception ==
Rajuan Alam was released in Indonesia in 1956. It was screened at the 4th Asia-Pacific Film Festival in Tokyo, Japan, in 1957. Hermanto and Noor travelled to Japan to attend the screening, where the film was given the English-language title A House, a Wife, a Singing Bird. This title was a reference to a Javanese view that all a man needed for true happiness was a place to live, a woman by his side, and a bird to sing to him.

== Works cited ==
- "Eerste PFN-product Bekoring der Natuur als kleurenfilm" [First PFN Colour Film Production, Call of Nature]. Algemeen Indisch dagblad (in Dutch). May 9, 1956. p. 1 – via delpher.nl.
- "Lies Noor en Bambang Hermanto naar Tokio" [Lies Noor and Bambang Hermanto go to Tokyo]. Algemeen Indisch dagblad (in Dutch). May 20, 1957. p. 3 – via delpher.nl.
- "Rajuan Alam". filmindonesia.or.id (in Indonesian). Konfiden Foundation. Archived from the original on October 20, 2016.
- "Rajuan Alam – Kredit" [Rajuan Alam – Credits]. filmindonesia.or.id (in Indonesian). Konfiden Foundation. Archived from the original on October 20, 2016.
