= Lies Noor =

Indonesian actress and model (1943–1961)

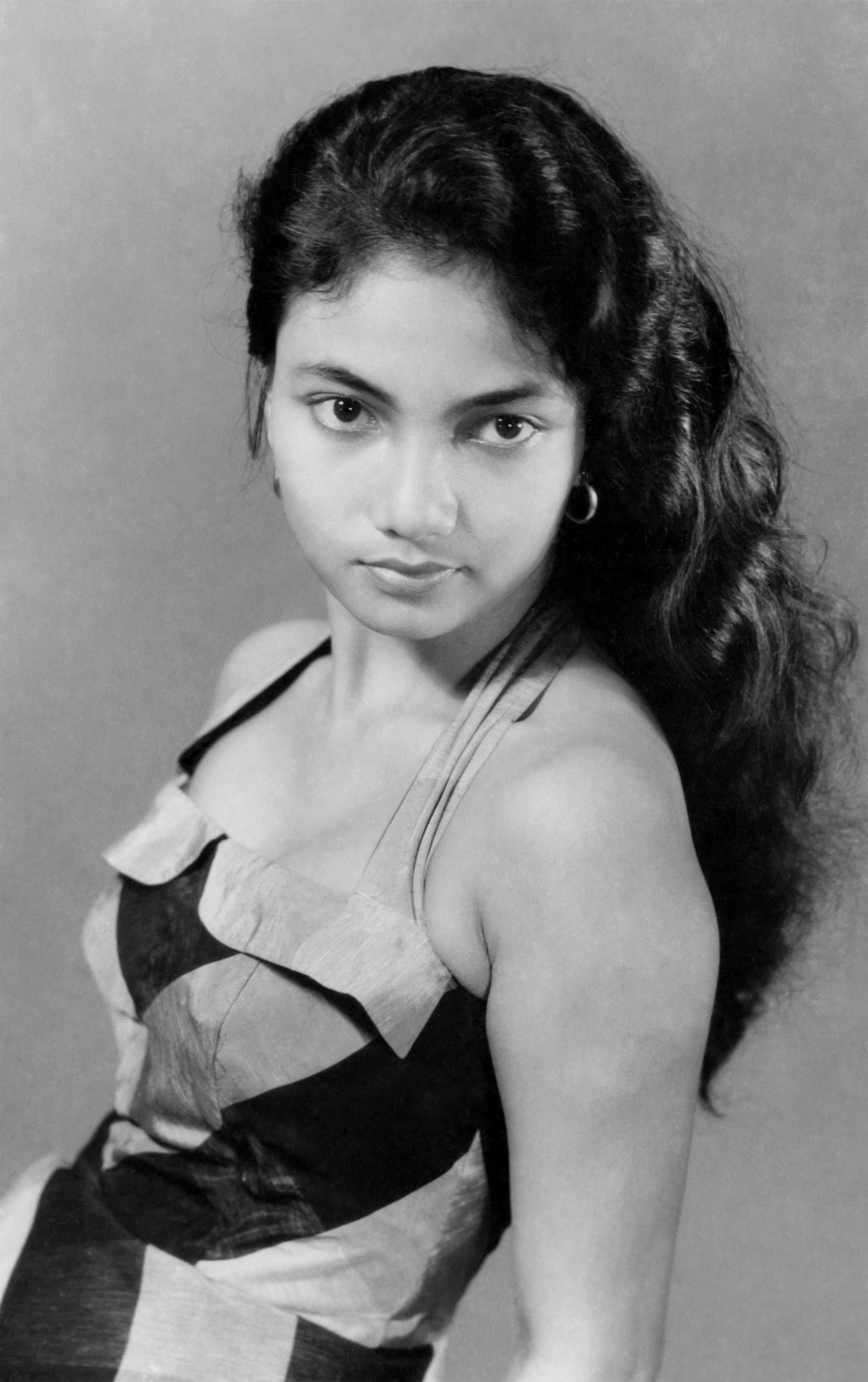
- Noor c. 1956
- Born: Eliza Noor; 12 July 1943; Batavia, Dutch East Indies
- Died: 14 March 1961 (aged 17); Jakarta, Indonesia
- Burial place: Karet Bivak Cemetery
- Other name: Elisa Firmansjah Noor
- Occupations: Actress; model
- Years active: 1952–1961
- Spouse: Firmansjah (aka Dick Ninkeula) (m. 1955)
- Children: 1

Eliza Firmansjah Noor (12 July 1943 – 14 March 1961), better known as Lies Noor, was an Indonesian actress and model. Rising to popularity after her appearance in 1952's Pulang (Homecoming), directed by Basuki Effendy, by 1955 Noor was able to demand fees of Rp 10,000 (USD 135) for her film appearances. She went on hiatus from acting after giving birth to her only child, later returning to cinema in 1960 with Pedjuang (Warriors for Freedom). Noor died of encephalitis on March 14, 1961, and was buried in Karet Bivak Cemetery.

== Early life ==
Lies Noor was born on 12 July 1943, in Batavia, Dutch East Indies, to Raden Mas Mohammad Noor Puspawidjaja. in an interview with Varia magazine, she said that she came from an old-fashioned family which did not want her to act.

== Career ==
While still in high school in Jakarta, in 1952, she was asked by Basuki Effendy to act in his film Pulang (Homecoming). Thinking that she could retire from acting immediately afterwards to work—like her role model Maria Ulfah Santoso—for social betterment, Noor accepted the role. Pulang was released to acclaim, with a review in De Nieuwsgier highlighting Noor as vibrant and photogenic.

Noor rapidly gained popularity in Indonesia for her acting, and soon offers came from other directors and producers. She appeared in Rentjong dan Surat in 1953, followed by Kopral Djono in 1954. In an August 1954 article for Film Varia magazine, Haznam Rahman described Noor as a new hope for Indonesian cinema, having found the greatest place in audiences' hearts despite her short filmography. He expressed hope that her future would be a bright one, and recommended that she migrate from Gabungan Artis Film (Association of Film Artists, GAF) to a larger studio such as Persari or Perfini. In September 1954, she was nominated for "Queen of the Silver Screen" by Film Varia magazine, which goes to Titien Sumarni.

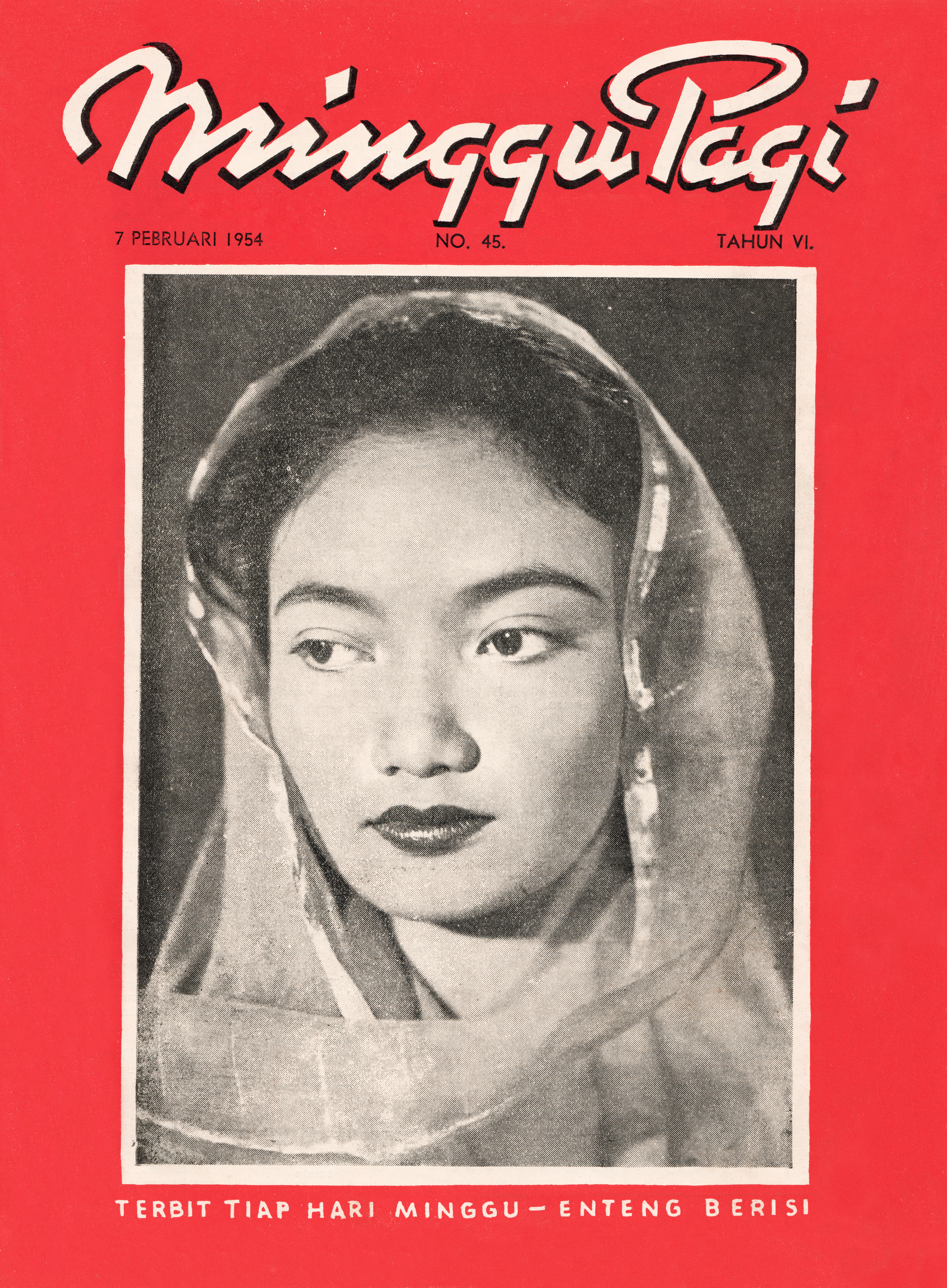
Noor on the cover of Minggu Pagi, 1955

Noor was most productive in 1955, when she appeared in five different films: Gagal (Failure), Peristiwa Didanau Toba (The Lake Toba Incident), Sampai Berdjumpa Kembali (Until We Meet Again), Ibu dan Putri (Mother and Daughter), and Oh, Ibuku (Oh, Mother). She was able to demand Rp 10,000 for a film produced in Jakarta or Rp 12,500 for a film produced outside of the city. (Note: According to an article in the March 1955 edition of Film Varia, the maximum fee paid to an Indonesian actor or actress at the time was Rp 10,000, though some actors and actresses had begun demanding Rp 15,000 (Sj. D. 1955, p. 3).) When she was approached by Honey Motion Pictures for Awan dan Tjemara (Clouds and Pines, 1955), she refused to take the lead role as she was only offered Rp 7,500; the role went to a newcomer, Triana.

In 1956, Noor went to Hong Kong with the Indonesian delegation to the 3rd Asia-Pacific Film Festival. That year she acted in three films: Melati Sendja (Twilight Jasmine), Peristiwa 10 Nopember (The 10 November Incident), and Rajuan Alam (Call of Nature). The last of these starred Noor alongside Bambang Hermanto as a husband and wife who must deal with malaria. For Rajuan Alam, in 1957 Noor travelled to Tokyo with her co-star for the 4th Asia-Pacific Film Festival, where the film was in competition under the title A House, a Wife, a Singing Bird.

After she gave birth, she took a hiatus from acting. Noor returned to cinema in 1960's Pedjuang (Warriors for Freedom), a film directed by Usmar Ismail which followed a platoon of Indonesian soldiers during the Indonesian National Revolution. She made her final film, Pesan Ibu (Mother's Message), in 1961. In this film, she played a young woman who had to help her mother support their family after their father's death. Noor was cast in Sandang Pangan (1961), but she died leaving the film unfinished.

== Personal life ==
Noor was married to Firmansjah (also known as Dick Ninkeula), a Produksi Film Negara employee whom she had met on the set of Pulang, in 1955, soon after graduating senior high school. After she gave birth to her only son, Rio Marcel Ninkeula, Noor took a hiatus from acting. She explained to Varia in a 1959 interview that she intended to focus on raising Rio until he was old enough for her to return to acting.

=== Illness and death ===
On 12 March 1961, Noor was admitted to Cikini Hospital, Jakarta, and treated for encephalitis. She died two days later at the age of 17, and was buried on 15 March at Karet Bivak Cemetery. At the funeral several film figures provided eulogies, including Djamaluddin Malik, Turino Djunaedy, and Basuki Effendy. Among the mourners were Chitra Dewi, Sofia Waldy, Bing Slamet, Dhalia, and Astaman.

== Filmography ==
In her nine-year career, Noor appeared in fourteen films.

- Pulang (1952)
- Rentjong dan Surat (1953)
- Kopral Djono (1954)
- Gagal (1955)
- Peristiwa Didanau Toba (1955)
- Sampai Berdjumpa Kembali (1955)
- Ibu dan Putri (1955)
- Oh, Ibuku (1955)
- Rajuan Alam (1956)
- Melati Sendja (1956)
- Peristiwa 10 Nopember (1956)
- Pedjuang (1960)
- Pesan Ibu (1961)
- Sandang Pangan (1961–unfinished)

== Works cited ==
- "Eerste PFN-product Bekoring der Natuur als kleurenfilm" [First PFN Colour Film Production, Call of Nature]. Algemeen Indisch dagblad (in Dutch). 9 May 1956. p. 1 – via delpher.nl.
- "Indonesische films naar Hongkong" [Indonesian Films in Hong Kong]. De nieuwsgier (in Dutch). 9 May 1956. p. 6 – via delpher.nl.
- "Jonge spelers" [Young Actors]. De nieuwsgier (in Dutch). 22 April 1954. p. 2 – via delpher.nl.
- Kristanto, JB, ed. (2007). Katalog Film Indonesia 1926–2007. Jakarta: Nalar. ISBN 978-979-26-9006-4.
- "Lies Noor en Bambang Hermanto naar Tokio" [Lies Noor and Bambang Hermanto go to Tokyo]. Algemeen Indisch dagblad (in Dutch). 20 May 1957. p. 3 – via delpher.nl.
- "Lies Noor – Filmografi" [Lies Noor – Filmography]. filmindonesia.or.id (in Indonesian). Jakarta: Konfiden Foundation. Archived from the original on 19 October 2016.
- "Lies Noor Meninggal" [Lies Noor Dies]. Nasional (in Indonesian). 16 March 1961. p. 3.
- "Lies Noor Meninggal" [Lies Noor Dies]. Varia (in Indonesian): 5, 26. 22 March 1961.
- Rahman, Haznam (August 1954). "Mengapa Film-Film Persari dan Perfini Djarang Beredar? Mana Nana Mayo? Lies Noor Harapan Baru" [Why are Persari and Perfini's Films So Rarely Released? Where is Nana Mayo? Lies Noor, a New Hope]. Film Varia (in Indonesian): 4–5, 35.
- Sj. D. (March 1955). "Honorarium Pemain Film" [Fees and Actors]. Film Varia (in Indonesian): 2–3, 39.
- Ambon, L. Tuanakotta (2 February 1955). "Surat-surat dari pembatja". Film Varia (in Indonesian). p. 44.
