= Miriam Bucher =

American female filmmaker

Miriam Bell Bucher (1912- 2002) was a pioneering 20th-century American female writer, editor, and director of documentary and educational films primarily based on international topics.

== Career ==
Early in her career, Miriam Bell was a film critic at the Miami Daily News. She then worked as an assistant to Pare Lorentz, well-known documentary director of films such as The Plow that Broke the Plains. Together with her husband, filmmaker Jules Bucher, whom she married in 1940, she worked with the Motion Picture Division of the Office of the Coordinator of Inter-American Affairs, producing numerous films about South America, often collaborating with filmmaker Julien Bryan. With the Simmel-Meservey company, she was involved in several short instructional films.

She and her husband lived and worked in Burma, Indonesia, India, Vietnam, and the Philippines in the 1950s and 1960s, making films, often working on projects for the US Information Agency and the US Agency for International Development. With Louis de Rochemont Productions, she went to Burma in the early 1950s to help establish the film industry there, serving as writer-editor member of the team and also assistant manager. The film Doh Pyi Daung Su (Our Burma), for which she wrote the screenplay, was screened at the 1953 Cannes Film Festival Short Film Competition. While living in Indonesia in the 1950s, she was involved with setting up the Indonesian film industry, as well as advising the South Vietnam film industry in the 1960s. In India, she worked for a private film production company called Art Films of Asia based in Bombay (Mumbai) that produced several documentary films on life, culture, and economy in post-Independence India. She later worked with Airlie Productions and Population Communication Services at Johns Hopkins University on films relating to population, reproductive health, and family planning.

== Filmography ==
- Roads South (1942), as scriptwriter
- Argentine Primer (1942), as scriptwriter
- Montevideo Family (1943), as scriptwriter
- Lima, Capital of Peru, Andes Mountains, South America (1944) as scriptwriter. Produced by the Office of the Coordinator of Inter-American Affairs.
- The High Plain (1944), as scriptwriter. Produced by the Office of the Coordinator of Inter-American Affairs.
- Let's Make A Sandwich (1950), as director and writer
- Let's Make A Meal In 20 Minutes (1950)
- Obligations (1950), as editor
- A Date with Your Family (1950), as editor
- Our Burma (1953) (alternate title Doh Pyi Daung Su), screened at the 1953 Cannes Film Festival.
- A House, a Wife, a Singing Bird (1956) (alternate title Rajuan Alam), as writer and director. A joint production of the US Information Service and Produksi Film Negara (PFN).
- River of Life (1960?) (alternate title Jeewan Ki Nadia), as writer and editor
- The Call, as director. A study on nursing at the JJ Hospital in Bombay for USAID.
- A Quiet Revolution (1974?), as screenwriter
- Dos Caminos (1974?), as screenwriter
- Cherish the Children (1974), screened at the 1976 Trento Film Festival
- A Question of Choice (1978), as screenwriter
- Para Cambiar Su Vida (1977), as screenwriter
- Vamos Donde Ello (1977), as screenwriter
- A Question of Justice (1977), as screenwriter/producer, about international women lawyers on needed legal reforms for women around the world
- To the People (1977), as screenwriter
- Social Marketing (1978), as screenwriter
- Indonesia: Family Planning First (1978)
- The Cheerful Revolution (1979)
- National Family Planning Programs; Restoring the Balance (197?), as writer
- Lessons For The Future (1980s?)
- Mexico: Year 2000 (1985?)
- The Joyful Day (1988), as screenwriter

== Personal life ==
Miriam Bell was born in Indiana in 1912 and attended Butler University. She married Jules Bucher in 1940. They had one son, Van Dyck Bucher. Jules Bucher was also a documentary filmmaker and the two often collaborated.
