= Iwan Tirta =

Indonesian fashion designer

Iwan Tirta (18 April 1935 – 31 July 2010) was an Indonesian batik fashion designer. Tirta trained as a lawyer, but became an internationally known designer. He is credited with beginning the early revival of batik design during the 1970s and 1980s. He also became an Indonesian and Javanese cultural advocate, as well as a food consultant, later in his career.

== Biography ==
=== Early life ===
Iwan Tirta was born Nusjirwan Tirtaamidjaja on 18 April 1935, in Blora, Central Java. Tirta, the youngest child in his family, had three older sisters. His father, Moh Husein Tirtaatmidjaja, served as a justice of the Supreme Court of Indonesia from 1950 until 1958. His mother was West Sumatran.

Tirta originally wanted to be a diplomat as a child, though his father encouraged him to study law. Tirta received a law degree from the University of Indonesia in 1958. He became a professor of international law following graduation. Tirta then moved to the United Kingdom to study at the London School of Economics and the School of Oriental and African Studies.

He was awarded the Adlai Stevenson Fellowship to study law at Yale Law School in Connecticut in 1964. Tirta moved to New York City upon the completion of his law degree in 1965, where he worked at the United Nations headquarters for several years.

=== Batik design ===
Tirta returned to Indonesia from New York City in 1970. Instead of utilizing his law degree as a profession, he started his career as a designer using traditional, hand-made batik cloth. Batik is a traditional art on Tirta's native island of Java. He began studying the design, motifs and manufacture process of batik.

Tirta authored several prominent books on the subject of batik. An advocate of batik decades before the fabric regained popularity, Tirta's designs gained attention both in Indonesia and internationally. He designed batik clothing for U.S. President Ronald Reagan and First Lady Nancy Reagan during their visit in the 1980s. Tirta's work achieved worldwide recognition in 1994 when he designed the batik shirts worn by world leaders at the Asia-Pacific Economic Cooperation summit in Bogor, Indonesia. He counted Nelson Mandela among his clients.

He was widely credited with the promotion of batik designs within the international fashion industry, including its magazines and fashion shows. However, despite its newfound popularity, Tirta was a critic of the recent revival of batik in the early 21st Century. He was especially critical of the embrace mass produced, printed batik over the traditional, handmade cloth, "The problem is that the establishment still doesn't know the difference between printed batik and the handmade one. It's our own mistake. They say *creative economy', and that's a contradiction. When the word economy comes into it ... you reduce everything to money. What we need now are good and knowledgeable patrons."

Tirta expanded from batik clothing into other batik inspired products in the last years of his life. He introduced news lines of ceramics and silverware embellished with traditional batik designs. Tirta also worked as a food consultant for upscale Indonesian restaurants.

Tirta established PT Iwan Tirta (with trademark name of Iwan Tirta (IT) Private Collection/ ITPC) in 2003. ITPC established its first gallery in 2006. ITPC opened its first mall location in 2008 and expanded further. Now it has 10 galleries already in prominent malls and locations in Jakarta & Surabaya (Galeria Grand Hyatt - Plaza Indonesia, Plaza Senayan, Senayan City, Pacific Place, Pondok Indah Mall 2, Jl Wijaya XIII, Shangrila Hotel Jakarta, Borobudur Hotel, Central - Grand Indonesia and SOGO Tunjungan Plaza IV - Surabaya).

As recently as 2007, Tirta partnered with Lydia Kusuma Hendra, the chairwoman of the PT Tri Marga Jaya Hutama ceramics company, to relaunch PT Pusaka Iwan Tirta, a line of batik-inspired ceramic dinnerware. The ceramics line was called Pusaka Maha Karya ("Heritage Masterpieces"), divided into two collections, Modang and Hokokai. His Hokotai collection was inspired by Hokokai batik, a form of batik which was created in the early 1940s during the Japanese occupation of the Dutch East Indies by painters in Pekalongan, Central Java, who themselves were inspired by kimono. The Modang collection was based on the batik traditionally worn by royal families in Yogyakarta.

In a 2009 interview with Time Magazine, Tirta listed some of his diverse influences, which included Pakubuwono X and other Javanese royalty, novelist Pramoedya Ananta Toer, Indonesian painters Raden Saleh and Srihadi, Yves Saint Laurent, Halston, Ludwig van Beethoven Johann Sebastian Bach and Wolfgang Amadeus Mozart.

=== Death ===
Iwan Tirta died on 31 July 2010 at Abdi Waluyo Hospital in Menteng, Central Jakarta, at the age of 75. He had suffered from diabetes and several strokes in the preceding years He was buried at Karet Bivak cemetery in Jakarta near his mother's tomb.

After three years of the maestro's departure, his name lives on.

Commemorating 1,000 days of his departure this year (2013), several events and milestones was highlighted among others: - Mobiliari group (Tatler Indonesia) has awarded a tribute to Iwan Tirta via Iwan Tirta Private Collection, on his role to promote Indonesian Batik as one of the luxury brands from Indonesia. March 2013, Darmawangsa Hotel

http://kennedyvoice-berliner.com/home/2013/03/19/mobiliariluxuryindustryconference/%5B%5D

https://web.archive.org/web/20160303233035/http://mobiliarigroup.com/events/indonesia-international-luxury-fair-2013/

- Tribute to Iwan Tirta by Berita Satu Media Holding and Gelar Nusantara. "Knights of the Golden Empress". Darmawangsa Hotel, July4th, 2013.

The management of PT Iwan Tirta has also paid tribute to the late maestro, visiting his tomb on last 8 July 2013.
