= Boes Boestami =

Indonesian journalist and film actor

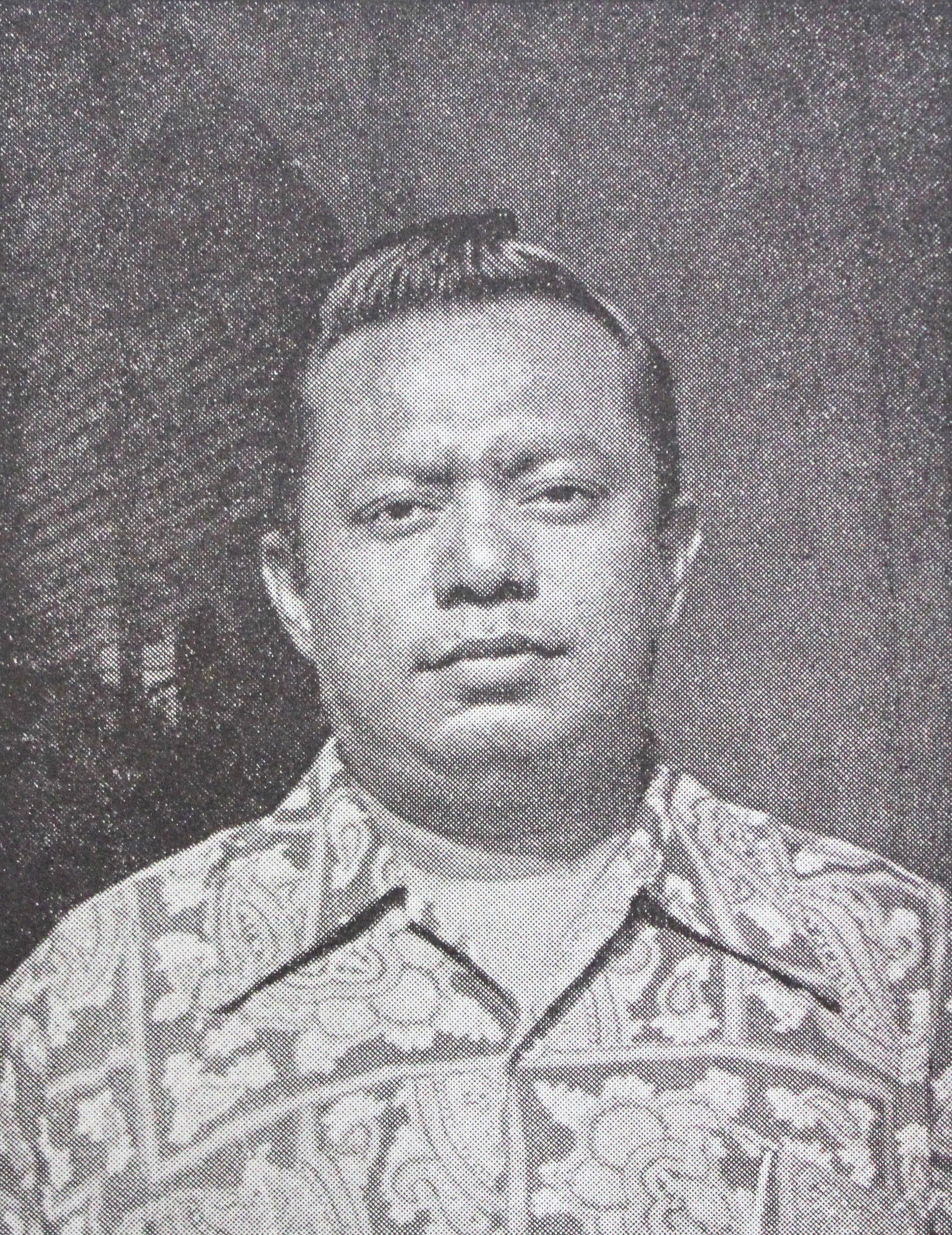
- Boestami in 1954
- Born: 30 December 1922; Batavia, Dutch East Indies
- Died: 11 September 1970 (aged 47); Jakarta, Indonesia
- Occupations: Journalist, actor
- Years active: 1950–1970

Boes Boestami (Perfected Spelling: Bus Bustami; 30 December 1922 – 11 September 1970) was an Indonesian journalist and film actor. He was mostly known for his comedic roles.

== Biography ==
Boestami was born in Batavia, Dutch East Indies (now Jakarta, capital of Indonesia), on 30 December 1922. As a child he went to a Europeesche Lagere School (European school), later studying at a trade school.

Boestami eventually began a career as a journalist, often covering film and entertainment news under the pen name "Bintang Ketjil" ("Little Star"). He was soon involved in the film industry as an actor, making his debut with a supporting role in Pelarian Pagar Besi (1951). He appeared in films by various production houses, including Borobudur Film, Bintang Surabaja, Asiatic Film Company, and Golden Arrow. At this last company, he secured a janitorial job for Wim Umboh, who later went on to become a multi-Citra Award winning director. Umboh eventually directed Boestami in Laki-Laki Tak Bernama (1969), the actor's last film.

Boestami did two films for Persari, a company owned by Djamaluddin Malik: Supir Istimewa and Leilani. In the latter film, he portrayed an obese man who fell in love with a young villager who said she would only marry him if he lost weight. The magazine Film Varia considered his role a highlight of the film. Boestami continued to act until the end of the 1960s.

While acting, Boestami continued to work as a journalist, at one point serving as the deputy chair of the film branch of the Indonesian Journalists Union. He served as editor of Aneka and Purnama, and wrote for Bintang Timur, Pemuda, Bintang Minggu, and Film Indonesia. While working with Bintang Timur, Boestami was part of the Indonesian delegation to the 1959 Asian Film Festival in Kuala Lumpur and Singapore. Aside from covering the trip—Usmar Ismail, the head of the delegation, wrote that the newspaper was one of the staunchest opponents of Indonesia's participation in the festival—Boestami performed the Tempurung dance.

Boestami died in Jakarta on 11 September 1970. At the funeral, the film producer Misbach Yusa Biran, remembering Boestami's large collection of film stills from the colonial period, was inspired to begin documenting the history of Indonesian cinema. He tried to purchase Boestami's collection, and though it had already been sold, Biran's efforts led to the establishment of Sinematek Indonesia in 1975.

== Filmography ==
During his twenty-year career, Boestami appeared in almost forty films. He was best known as a comedic actor.

- Dunia Gila (1951)
- Terbelenggu (1951)
- Pelarian dari Pagar Besi (1951)
- Bermain dengan Api (1952)
- Dewa Dewi (1952)
- KM 49 (1952)
- Kumala Dewa Dewi (1952)
- Solo Di Waktu Malam (1952)
- Belenggu Masjarakat (1953)
- Krisis Achlak (1953)
- Leilani (1953)
- Supir Istimewa (1954)
- Djaja Merana (1954)
- Adios (1954)
- Lain Dulu Lain Sekarang (1954)
- Putri dari Medan (1954)
- Tjuriga (1954)
- Genangan Air Mata (1955)
- Guntur (1955)
- Disimpang Jalan (1955)
- Dharma Bakti (1955)
- Dibalik Dinding (1955)
- Putra Solo (1955)
- Rajuan Alam (1956)
- Neng Atom (1956)
- Peristiwa 10 Nopember (1956)
- Peristiwa Surabaja Gubeng (1956)
- Pilihlah Aku (1956)
- Serampang 12 (1956)
- Air Mata Ibu (1957)
- Dewi (1957)
- Sedetik Lagi (1957)
- Bunga dan Samurai (1958)
- Momon (1959)
- Dara Kembar (1960)
- Bakti (1963)
- Minah Gadis Dusun (1966)
- Matahari Pagi (1968)
- Laki-Laki Tak Bernama (1969)

== Works cited ==
- Asyhad, Moh. Habib (30 March 2015). "Hari Film Nasional: Sejarah Sinematek Indonesia dan Pengorbanan Nani Wijaya" [National Film Day: The History of Sinematek Indonesia and the Sacrifice of Nani Wijaya]. Intisari (in Indonesian). Archived from the original on 4 January 2016.
- Biran, Misbach Yusa, ed. (1979). Apa Siapa Orang Film Indonesia 1926–1978 [What and Who: Film Figures in Indonesia, 1926–1978]. Sinematek Indonesia. OCLC 6655859.
- "Bus Bustami". Film Varia (in Indonesian). 1 (6). Jakarta: 22. May 1954.
- "Filmografi Boes Boestami" [Boes Boestami Filmography]. filmindonesia.or.id (in Indonesian). Konfiden Foundation. Archived from the original on 11 March 2016.
- Ismail, Usmar (1983). "Laporan dari Festival Film Asia" [Report from the Asian Film Festival]. Usmar Ismail Mengupas Film [Usmar Ismail Discusses Film] (in Indonesian). Jakarta: Sinar Harapan. pp. 113–130. OCLC 10435722.
- "Laki-Laki Tak Bernama". filmindonesia.or.id (in Indonesian). Konfiden Foundation. Archived from the original on 9 March 2016.
- "Telah Pergi Seorang Wim Umboh" [Wim Umboh has Passed Away]. Republika (in Indonesian). 25 January 1996.
