= Wim Umboh =

Indonesian film director (1933–1996)

- Born: Liem Yan Yung 林言容; 26 March 1933; Manado, North Sulawesi, Dutch East Indies
- Died: 24 January 1996 (aged 62); Jakarta, Indonesia
- Resting place: Jeruk Purut Cemetery
- Other name: Ahmad Salim (After converting to Islam)
- Occupations: Director, editor
- Years active: 1955–1996
- Spouses: R.O. Unarsih (m. 1955; div. 1957) Paula Rumokoy (m. 1974; div. 1982) Inne Hermina Chomid (m. 1984)
- Awards: Numerous Citra Awards

Ahmad Salim (26 March 1933 – 24 January 1996), better known by his birth name Wim Umboh but also known by the Chinese name Liem Yan Yung, was an Indonesian director who is best known for his melodramatic romances.

Born in North Sulawesi, Umboh was orphaned at the age of eight and later adopted by a Chinese-Indonesian doctor. After high school, he moved to Jakarta and found work at Golden Arrow Studios as a janitor and, later, translator. In 1955 he made his screen debut as a director with Dibalik Dinding (Behind the Walls). During his career, which spanned more than forty years, Umboh directed close to fifty movies, which garnered 29 Citra Awards from the Indonesian Film Festival. He was diagnosed with liver cancer in 1978 but, after recovering, he continued to work until his death from complications of diabetes and a stroke. Umboh was married three times and had two children.

An authoritarian director who strove for perfection, Umboh was known for experimenting with different technologies and, according to fellow director Teguh Karya, memorised the entire dialogue of his films during shooting. He preferred medium and close-up shots. Umboh influenced numerous Indonesian directors, including Karya, Slamet Rahardjo, Garin Nugroho, and Arifin C. Noer, and his work launched the careers of several Indonesian stars, including Sophan Sophiaan and Roy Marten. Among his most famous works are Pengantin Remadja (Teenage Bride; 1971), Mama (1972), and Pengemis dan Tukang Becak (The Beggar and the Pedicab Driver; 1978), the last of which was Umboh's personal favourite.

== Biography ==
=== Early life ===
Umboh was born in Wauilinei, Manado, North Sulawesi, Dutch East Indies, on 26 March 1933 to Oscal Yeng Liem Umboh and Non Umboh, an ethnic Minahasan family. He had 11 siblings. When Umboh was seven, their mother died, and when his father died the following year Umboh was adopted by a Chinese-Indonesian doctor named Liem. After being adopted, he received the Chinese name Liem Yan Yung and began learning Mandarin. While working part-time as a shoemaker, he finished high school; in high school he began writing scripts for stageplays. In 1952 Umboh decided to go to Jakarta.

Umboh was introduced to the film industry in 1953 by Boes Boestami, who secured him a job as a janitor at Golden Arrow Studios, owned by Chok Chin Hsin (also known as CC Hardy). He later became a Mandarin-Indonesian translator for imported films and studied filmmaking from Chok. In the 1950s, he was a member of the Senen Artists' Group, a group which met at Senen in Jakarta.

=== Career ===
Umboh made his directorial debut with Dibalik Dinding (Behind the Walls) in 1955. This was followed in 1956 by Terang Bulan Terang di Tengah Kali (Moonlight Shining in the Middle of the Stream), which also marked the first acting role of future director Sjumandjaja. That same year, he married R.O. Unarsih, with whom he had had a daughter named Maria the following year; the couple divorced in 1957. Umboh founded Aries Film together with Any Mambo in 1960, and the studio released its first film, Istana Jang Hilang (The Missing Palace). Three years later, he directed his daughter in Bintang Ketjil (Small Star).

Umboh's film Sembilan (Nine; 1967) was the first fully Indonesian film to be both in colour and CinemaScope; it was released at a time when the Indonesian film industry was incredulous of the profitability of colour films. Umboh released Pengantin Remadja (Teenage Bride) in 1971, which went on to win the Asian Film Festival; the film cast Sophan Sophiaan and Widyawati in its starring roles and led to the pair taking romantic roles together several more times. Umboh's 1972 film Mama was the first local production shot in 70 mm film and stereo sound. The film was also shot without a screenplay; instead, Sjumandjaja wrote the script while shooting was in progress. In 1973 Umboh cast Sophan Sophiaan and Widyawati together again for his film Pernikahan (Wedding), which went on to win eight Citra Awards at the Indonesian Film Festival; the win was a record which held for 13 years, until Teguh Karya's Ibunda (Mother) took away nine Citras in 1986. On 23 May 1974, he married actress Paula Rumokoy, a divorcée 16 years his junior, in a civil ceremony in Jakarta.

Umboh fell ill around the time he was filming Pengemis dan Tukang Becak (The Beggar and the Pedicab Driver; 1978), which starred Christine Hakim and Alan Nuary. According to Sophan Sophian, Umboh fell in the bathroom when the film was being shot in Surakarta, Central Java, leaving Umboh was unconscious for eleven days. The film was finished by Lukman Hakim Nain, and Umboh was sent back to Jakarta after several blood infusions in Surakarta. He was treated at Husada Hospital in Mangga Besar and diagnosed with aggressive liver cancer. At Husada, he spent a week in the intensive care unit, during which time he lost 9 kilograms (20 lb), before being put in a regular room. The hospital stay devastated him financially, which led to a 2-year struggle with the tax office over back taxes. A heavy smoker, after his struggle with cancer he cut back on the habit.

By August 1980 Umboh had recovered enough strength to direct his next film, Disini Cinta Pertama Kali Bersemi (Here Love Bloomed for the First Time), based on the novel by Mira W. Shortly before directing Putri Seorang Jenderal (A General's Daughter; an adaptation of Motinggo Busye's novel of the same name) in 1981, Umboh divorced Roemokoy. Umboh converted to Islam in 1983 and changed his name to Ahmad Salim. On 24 August of the following year Umboh married Inne Ermina Chomid, a police officer's daughter of Sundanese descent 28 years his junior. As his health was improving, Umboh continued to make films, including Kabut Perkawinan (The Fog of Wedlock; 1984). Umboh and Chomid had a son, William Umboh Ikhsan Salim, in 1986.

=== Later years and death ===
After the Indonesian film industry crashed in 1992 Umboh directed two television serials: Pahlawan Tak Dikenal (Unknown Hero; 1994) and Apsari. The crash, along with his long illness, led his finances to destabilise, to the point where he lived in government housing. In 1994 Suara Pembaharuan (now Suara Pembaruan), inaccurately reported him having died, a claim which Umboh publicly refuted. Umboh died at 4:45 am WIB (UTC+7) on 24 January 1996 in Jakarta of complications from diabetes and a stroke. He was buried in Jeruk Purut Cemetery, South Jakarta. Three weeks before his death, he was reportedly in good health and preparing to film a new serial entitled Gejolak Kampus Muda (Symptoms of a Youth Campus).

== Style ==
Umboh was an authoritarian perfectionist, who often reshot scenes he felt flawed and refused input from the actors. He sometimes worked together with other directors, including Sjumandjaja, Misbach Yusa Biran, and Arifin C. Noer, to improve the film's flow. These collaborations influenced the atmosphere of the films; for example, films shot with Noer like Sesuatu yang Indah (Something Beautiful; 1976) came across as surrealistic, while collaborations with Sjumandjaja were more realistic. Shooting scripts were often prepared minutes before shooting, but, according to Karya, Umboh memorised each line of dialogue and used his recollection during dubbing.

Most of the films directed by Umboh were romantic melodramas, a genre which had existed in Indonesia since the 1950s but was refined by Umboh. However, he preferred shooting films with a social message; he considered Pengemis dan Tukang Becak his favourite film. When shooting, Umboh minimised his use of master shots, instead preferring to use medium and close-up shots; his obituary in Kompas notes that around 80 per cent of any given Umboh film used these latter two shots.

== Legacy ==
Kompas notes that several Indonesian directors have been directly influenced by Umboh. Slamet Rahardjo and Garin Nugroho have continued his exploratory shooting techniques, while his editing and framing methods were further developed by Teguh Karya, Sophian, and Noer. The careers of numerous actors were launched by Umboh's films, including Sophiaan, Roy Marten, Tanti Yosepha, and Yenny Rachman. In a 1996 interview with Republika, Widyawati credited Umboh for her marriage to Sophiaan as he had introduced them for Pengantin Remadja. In a eulogy at Umboh's funeral, Rahardjo – then head of the Television Actors Guild – said that the Indonesian film industry would be "nothing" if it were not for Umboh's contributions.

== Awards ==
During his career, Umboh's films received 29 Citra Awards, nine of which were specifically for Umboh as director or editor. Award-winning films he directed include Pengantin Remadja, Mama, and Pengemis dan Tukang Becak.

== Filmography ==
- Dibalik Dinding (Behind the Walls; 1955)
- Kasih Ibu (A Mother's Love; 1955)
- Terang Bulan Terang Di Kali (Moonlight Shining over the Stream; 1956)
- Kunang-kunang (Fireflies; 1957)
- Arriany (1958)
- Djuara Sepatu Roda (Roller Skate Champion; 1958)
- Tiga Mawar (1959)
- Istana yang Hilang (The Missing Palace; 1960)
- Mendung Sendja Hari (Cloudy in the Evening; 1960)
- Djumpa Diperjalanan (Meet Along the Way; 1961)
- Bintang Ketjil (Small Star; 1963)
- Kunanti Djawabmu (I'll Await Your Answer; 1964)
- Matjan Kemajoran (The Tiger of Kemayoran; 1965)
- Apa Jang Kau Tangisi (What are You Crying About; 1965)
- Sembilan (Nine; 1967)
- Laki-Laki Tak Bernama (Man Without a Name; 1969)
- Isamar (1969)
- Dan Bunga-bunga Berguguran (And the Flowers Wilt; 1970)
- Pengantin Remaja (Teenage Bride; 1971)
- Biarlah Aku Pergi (Let Me Go; 1971)
- Perkawinan (Marriage; 1972)
- Mama (1972)
- Tokoh (Figure; 1973)
- Senyum di Pagi Bulan September (Smile on a September Morning; 1974)
- Cinta (Love; 1975)
- Smile on a December Morning (1975)
- Sesuatu yang Indah (Something Beautiful; 1976)
- Kugapai Cintamu (I'm Reaching for Your Love; 1977)
- Kembang-kembang Plastik (Plastic Flowers; 1977)
- Yang Negara Si Wanita (Land of the Woman; 1978)
- Pengemis Dan Tukang Becak (The Beggar and the Pedicab Driver; 1978)
- Disini Cinta Pertama Kali Bersemi (Here Love Bloomed for the First Time; 1980)
- When Love Breaks Through (1980)
- Hidup Tanpa Kehormatan (Life Without Honour; 1981)
- Putri Seorang Jenderal (A General's Daughter; 1981)
- Perkawinan 83 (Wedding 83; 1982)
- Pengantin Pantai Biru (The Bridegroom of Blue Beach; 1983)
- Johanna (1983)
- Kabut Perkawinan (The Fog of Wedlock; 1984)
- Biarkan Kami Bercinta (Let Us Love; 1984)
- Permata Biru (Blue Gem; 1984)
- Pondok Cinta (Love Shack; 1985)
- Serpihan Mutiara Retak (A Fragmented Pearl; 1985)
- Secawan Anggur Kebimbangan (A Glass of Wine; 1986)
- Merpati Tak Pernah Ingkar Janji (Doves Don't Break Promises; 1986)
- Aku Benci Kamu (I Hate You; 1987)
- Tatkala Mimpi Berakhir (When the Dreams End; 1987)
- Seputih Kasih Semerah Luka (As White as Love As Red as a Wound; 1988)
- Selamat Tinggal Jeanette (Goodbye Jeanette; 1988)
- Arini II (1988)
- Adikku Kekasihku (My Sister My Lover; 1989)
- Kristal-kristal Cinta (Love's Crystals; 1989)
- Bercinta Dalam Mimpi (Loving in a Dream; 1989) – as an actor
- Pengantin (Bride; 1990)
- Ayu Genit (Flirting Beauty; 1990)
- Pengantin Remaja (1991) – TV Series
