= Satyagraha Hoerip =

Indonesian writer and journalist (1934–1998)

- Born: Hoerip Satyagraha Prawirodihardjo; 7 April 1934; Lamongan, Dutch East Indies
- Died: 14 October 1998 (aged 64); Jakarta, Indonesia
- Occupation: Writer

Raden Hoerip Satyagraha Prawirodihardjo (7 April 1934 – 14 October 1998), popularly known as Oyik, was an Indonesian writer and journalist. He was mostly renowned for his short stories, some of which were set in the Indonesian mass killings of 1965–1966.

== Early life and education ==
Hoerip was born in Lamongan Regency on 7 April 1934, as the eldest of four children. His parents were of Javanese nobility and worked as civil servants in the colonial government, his mother a cousin of later president Sukarno. He for a time studied at a Dutch Europeesche Lagere School, before completing his middle and high school education across East Java in independent Indonesia. While in high school, he studied under novelist Iwan Simatupang.

After completing high school, he enrolled first at the law faculty of the University of Indonesia. However, he did not have interest in law, and was more interested in literature. Due to this, he did not complete his degree, and after two years he moved to Gadjah Mada University still in the law faculty. At Gadjah Mada, he more often attended literature classes, and so he once more moved to Padjadjaran University's law faculty. Again, he was more interested in literature, and eventually he never attained a degree. During his studies, he edited student magazines in addition to writing for external magazines and newspapers.

== Career ==
After his education, Hoerip did not hold any permanent jobs for extended periods. He worked as a journalist and editor for several newspapers such as Sinar Harapan, lectured at several universities in Indonesia and abroad, and for a time at the Algerian embassy in Jakarta. Due to his tendency to move jobs, Hoerip described himself as an "unemployed homeless intellectual".

Hoerip had been an active writer since his time in middle school, mostly writing short stories and poetry initially under the pen name "I Gst Poreh". His works focused on the life of the poor and social criticism of the rich and powerful. He also authored a wayang-based novel, and a movie script titled Palupi - later made into the film Apa Jang Kau Tjari, Palupi? (1969) by director Asrul Sani. His 1966 short story, Pada Titik Kulminasi, was set in the ongoing mass killings at that time, written in a perspective sympathetic to the perpetrators of the killings. Sebelum Yang Terakhir (1968), another of Hoerip's short stories, also covered the mass killings, was described as "vague" and "slant". Hoerip also compiled a collection of 12 short stories set during the killings and written in the late 1960s by other senior authors such as Mochtar Lubis and Gerson Poyk. He continued to write later during the New Order era, although not as productive as previously.

== Personal life ==
While Hoerip was born a Muslim, he converted to Christianity after marrying his wife Agustina Wilhelmina Ulag Nieman in 1964. The couple has five children. He was described as a bohemian who always carried a pair of sunglasses. Goenawan Mohamad described Hoerip as a "follower of Sjahrir", heavily affected by Sjahrir's imprisonment and the emergence of "Guided Democracy".

He died on 14 October 1998 in Jakarta.
