= Supir Istimewa =

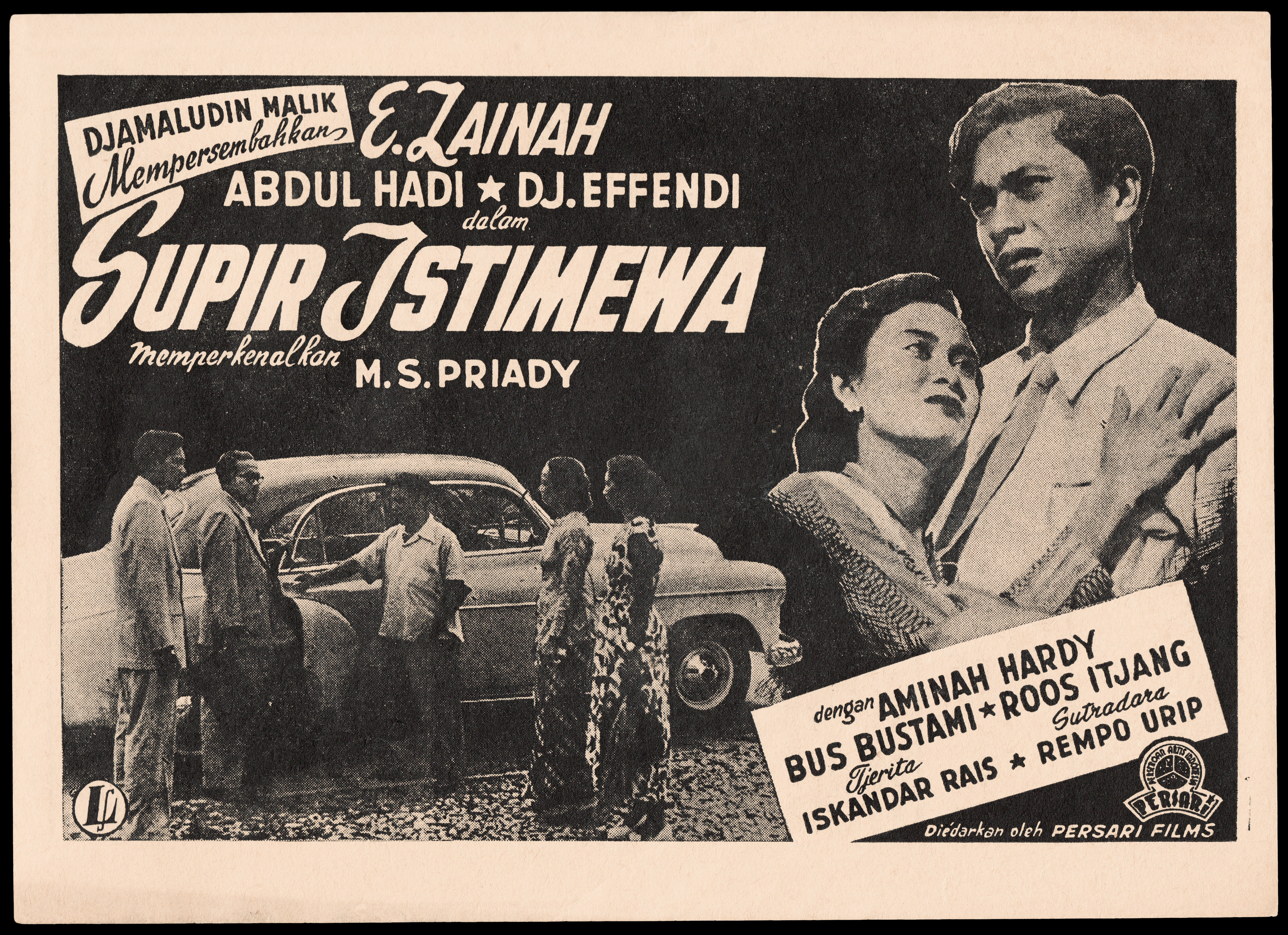
- Promotional flyer
- Directed by: Rempo Urip
- Written by: Saleh Iskandar Rais
- Produced by: Djamaluddin Malik
- Starring: MS Priyadi; Ermina Zaenah; Abdul Hadi; Djauhari Effendi
- Production company: Persari Film Corporation
- Release date: 1954
- Country: Indonesia
- Language: Indonesian

Supir Istimewa ("Special Chauffeur") is a 1954 Indonesian film directed by Rempo Urip and produced by Djamaluddin Malik for the Persari Film Corporation. Starring MS Priyadi, Ermina Zaenah, Abdul Hadi, and Djauhari Effendi, the film follows a wealthy young man who passes as a chauffeur to convince a village woman to fall in love with him.

== Plot ==
Kadir (MS Priyadi), a rich young man from the city, falls in love with Rukyah (Ermina Zaenah), a beautiful maiden from the countryside. During their first meeting, however, Rukyah treats Kadir roughly; since her mother (Roos Itjang) married a rich man who later manipulated and abused her, she considered all rich people to be untrustworthy.

To gain Rukyah's affections, Kadir passes as a chauffeur. He is supported by his uncle, Abdul Sjukur (Abdul Hadi), but challenged by his spoiled sister Khalsum (Yaya Hidayati). Kadir's parents, however, Abdul Wahab (Djauhari Effendi) and Yatimah (Aminah Hardy), are too busy with Abdul Wahab's business dealings to support their children.

Rukyah is accused of stealing a necklace by Kadir's mother and runs away. Kadir, upon discovering that the necklace's owner had simply misplaced it, chases after Rukyah and is able to find her. In the end, the two are able to marry and live happily ever after.

== Production ==
Supir Istimewa was produced for Persari Film Corporation by Djamaluddin Malik. The film was one in a long line of commercially oriented ventures which had been produced by the company starting with Sedap Malam in 1950. This black-and-white film was directed by Rempo Urip based on a screenplay by Saleh Iskandar Rais. Urip was supported by Syahril Gani, who served as assistant director and assistant editor.

The film starred MS Priyadi, Ermina Zaenah, Abdul Hadi, and Djauhari Effendi. They were supported by Aminah Hardy, Boes Boestami, Roos Itjang, and Yaya Hitayati. Supir Istimewa was the feature film debut of Priyadi and Hitayati; Priyadi went on to appear in another nine films for Persari, ending with Dewi in 1957, whereas Hidayati continued acting for the company until Rindu Damai in 1955.

== Release ==
Supir Istimewa passed the censorship bureau in 1954, and was rated for ages 17 and up. It was being screened in the city of Semarang by September of that year.

== Works cited ==
- Biran, Misbach Yusa, ed. (1979). Apa Siapa Orang Film Indonesia 1926–1978 [What and Who: Film Figures in Indonesia, 1926–1978]. Sinematek Indonesia. OCLC 6655859.
- "Film Baru: "Supir Istimewa"" [New Film: Supir Istimewa]. Kentjana (in Indonesian). 1 (11). Jakarta. 30 April 1954.
- "Filmografi untuk MS Priyadi" [Filmography for MS Priyadi]. filmindonesia.or.id (in Indonesian). Konfiden Foundation. Archived from the original on 21 April 2017.
- Kristanto, JB, ed. (2007). Katalog Film Indonesia 1926– 2007. Jakarta: Nalar. ISBN 978-979-26-9006-4.
- "Royal". De Locomotief (in Dutch). Semarang. 21 September 1954. p. 4.
- Supir Istimewa (brochure) (in Indonesian), Persari Film Corporation, 1954, reverse
