= Ermina Zaenah =

Indonesian actress and producer (1927–2009)

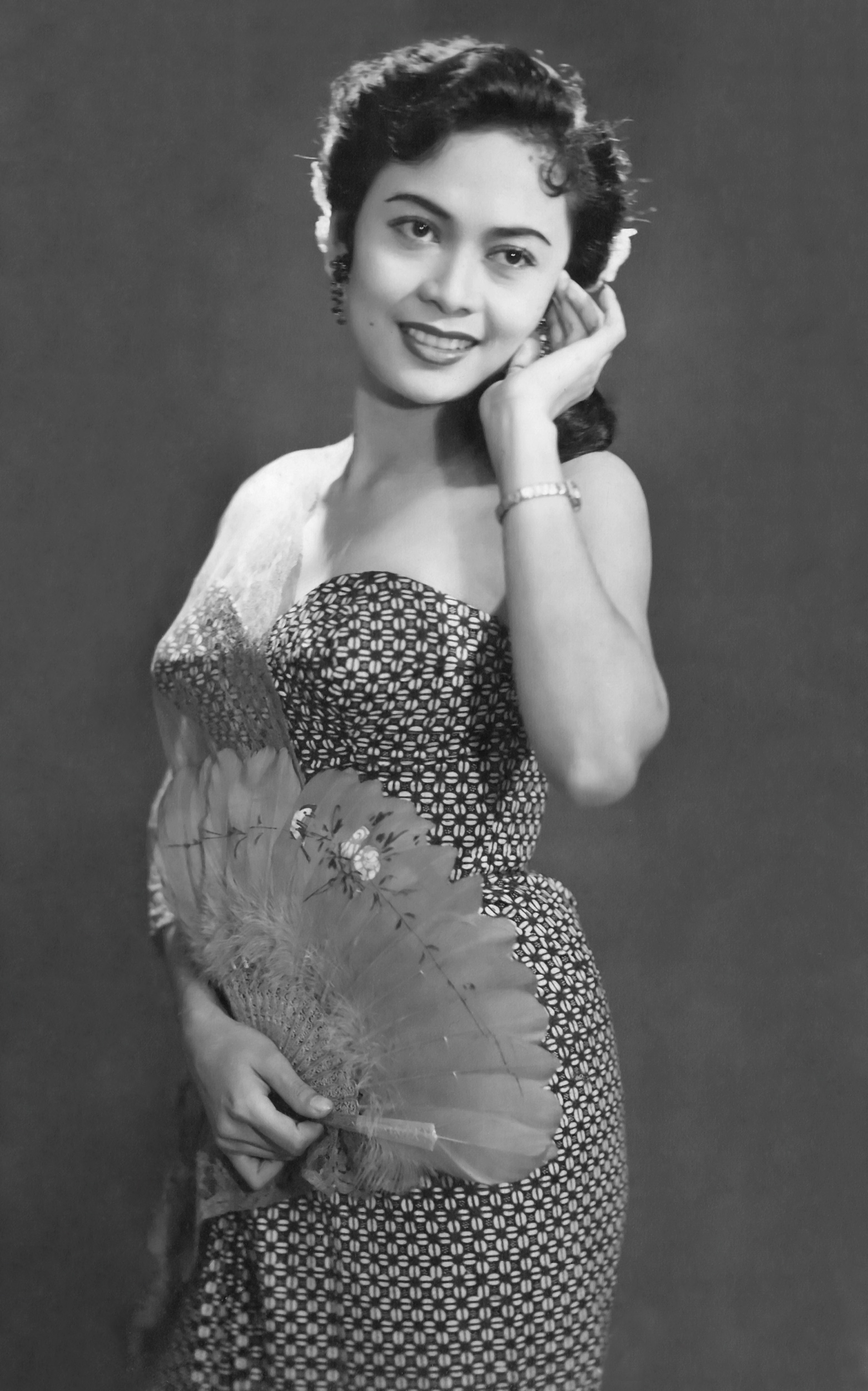
- Zaenah in c. 1960
- Born: 11 November 1927; Jambi, Dutch East Indies
- Died: 4 January 2009 (aged 81); Cimahi, West Java, Indonesia
- Occupations: Actress; producer
- Years active: 1951–1964, 1982–1983
- Spouses: Nurdin Syam (m. 1943) John R. Sibih (m. 1965)

Ermina Zaenah (11 November 1927 – 4 January 2009) was an Indonesian actress and film producer who was active in the 1950s and 1960s. She was part of Classical Indonesian Cinema.

== Life and career ==
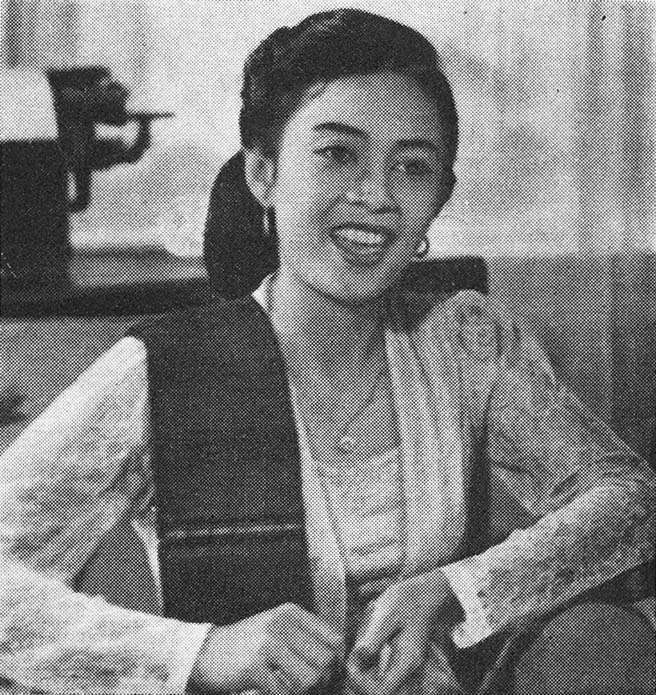
Zaenah in 1954

Zaenah was born on 11 November 1927 in Jambi, Dutch East Indies, to Mar'i Yusuf. She had a younger brother, Marzuki Yusuf. Zaenah was married to Nurdin Syam, a navy captain who later became a director at Persari, in 1943. As of 1979, she was resided in Bandung, West Java. Aside from acting in stage plays, Zaenah led her own musical group, the Los Suita Rama, and performed topeng dance.

In 1951, Zaenah entered the film industry. Originally she performed in productions by a number of companies, including Golden Arrow, Fred Young's Bintang Surabaya, and Tan and Wong Bros. In 1953 she migrated to Djamaluddin Malik's Persari, starring in several films for the company, including Supir Istimewa, Pegawai Tinggi (cited by Film Varia as Zaenah's greatest opportunity to gain domestic fame equal to Titien Sumarni), and Bintang Baru.

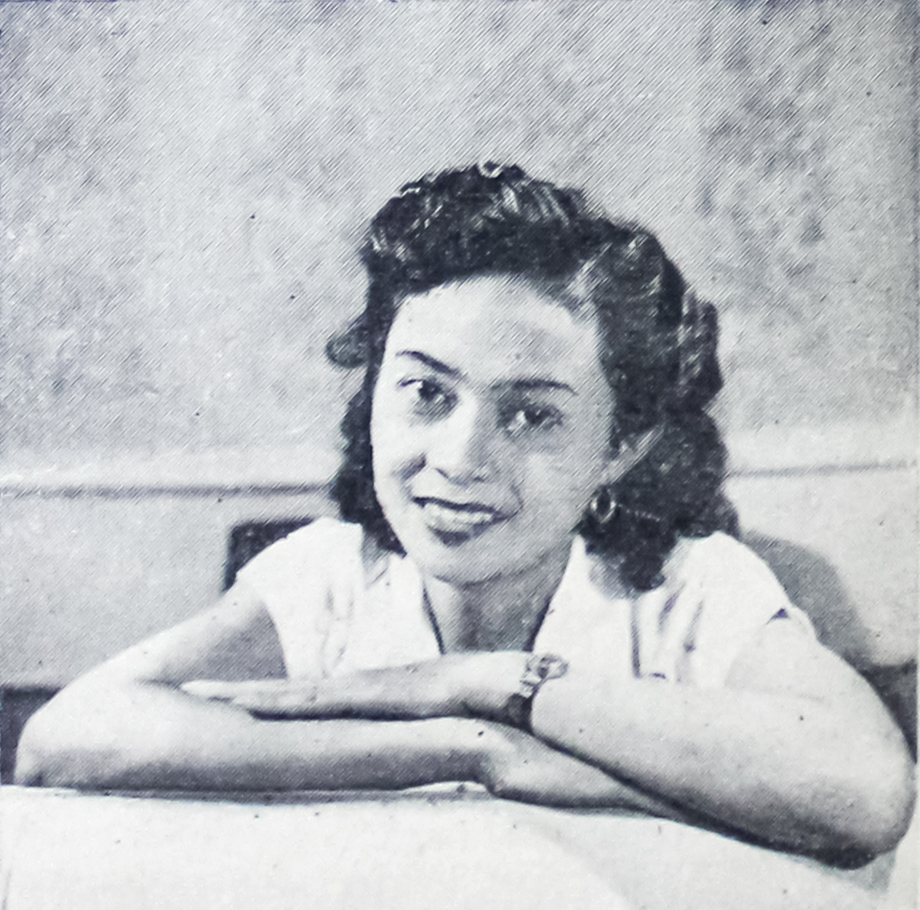
Zaenah in 1956

In the 1960s, as the domestic film industry was suffering, Zaenah moved behind the camera. She worked as producer on four films: Kamar 13 (Room 13, 1961), Lagu dan Buku (Song and Book, 1961), Bakti (Service, 1963), and Ekspedisi Terakhir (The Last Expedition, 1964). She returned to the theater for a short time when she toured Java with the group Sapta Daya. Her fellow actors during this tour included Astaman, Awaludin, and M. Budharasa.

Zaenah was married to her second husband, John R. Sibih, the President Director of Gema Masa Film, in 1965, and was attended by actress Sri Redjeki. By the 1970s, she was working as an entrepreneur, focusing on mercantile efforts. Zaenah died in Cimahi, West Java, on 4 January 2009, at the age of 81.

== Filmography ==
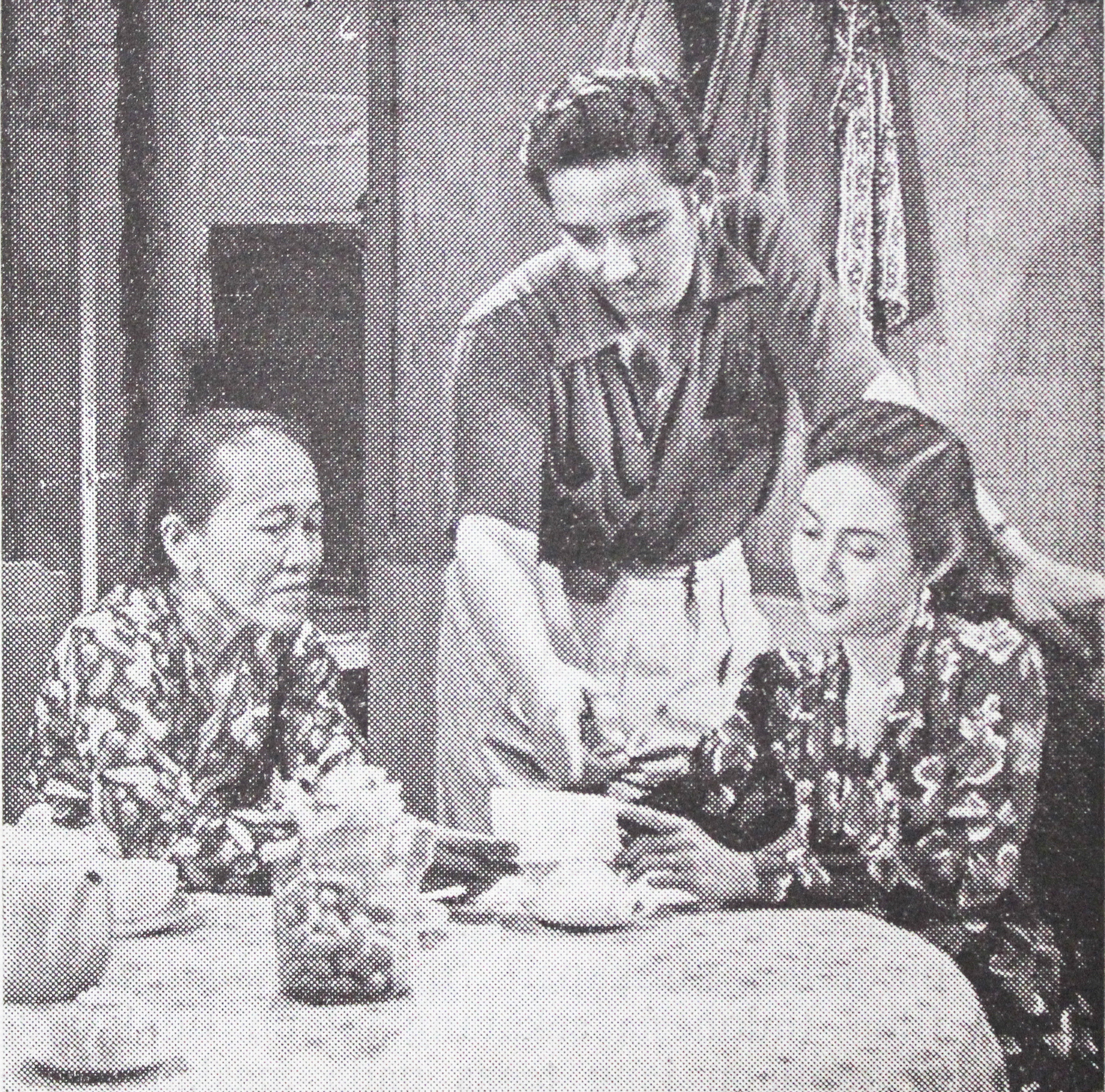
Zaenah, Mak Roos, and S. Bono in a scene from Bintang Baru (1954)

During her sixteen-year career, Zaenah acted in thirty two films. She also produced four productions.

=== Cast ===
- Aku dan Masjarakat (1951)
- Seruni Laju (1951)
- Pelarian dari Pagar Besi (1951)
- Pembalasan (1951)
- Bermain dengan Api (1952)
- Kekal Abadi (1952)
- Kisah Kenangan (1952)
- Tiga Pendekar Teruna (1952)
- Sangkar Emas (1952)
- Siapa Dia (1952)
- Surja (1952)
- Ajah Kikir (1953)
- Asmara Murni (1953)
- Bagdad (1953)
- Bawang Merah Bawang Putih (1953)
- Kenari (1953)
- Bintang Baru (1954)
- Gara-gara Djanda Muda (1954)
- Kasih Sajang (1954)
- Pegawai Tinggi (1954)
- Supir Istimewa (1954)
- Gadis Sesat (1955)
- Hadiah 10.000 (1955)
- Berdjumpa Kembali (1955)
- Lagak Internasional (1955)
- Harta Angker (1956)
- Kamar Kosong (1956)
- Buruh Bengkel (1956)
- Sendja Indah (1957)
- Ibu Mertua (1960)
- Nyi Blorong (1982)
- Perkawinan Nyi Blorong (1983)

=== Crew ===
- Kamar 13 (1961)
- Lagu dan Buku (1961)
- Bakti (1963)
- Ekspedisi Terakhir (1964)

== Works cited ==
- Ardan, S. M.; Hadimadja, Ramadhan Karta; Poeradisastra, Ratih; Sari, Fitria (2004). Jejak Seorang Aktor Sukarno M. Noor dalam Film Indonesia [Footsteps of the Actor Sukarno M. Noor in Indonesian Cinema] (in Indonesian). Jakarta: Aksara Karunia.
- Biran, Misbach Yusa, ed. (1979). Apa Siapa Orang Film Indonesia 1926–1978 [What and Who: Film Figures in Indonesia, 1926–1978]. Sinematek Indonesia. OCLC 6655859.
- Indonesia, Madjalah Mimbar (1965). Mimbar Indonesia (in Indonesian). Pembangunan Politik, Ekonomi, Sosial dan Kebudajan.
- "Filmografi Ermina Zaenah" [Ermina Zaenah Filmography]. filmindonesia.or.id (in Indonesian). Konfiden Foundation. Archived from the original on 9 February 2016.
- "Gelanggang Datuk Sari" [Datuk Sari's Corner]. Film Varia (in Indonesian). 1 (11): 28–29. November 1954.
- Fauziah, Syifa (17 July 2023). Sari, Siska Permata (ed.). "Mengintip Pesona Bintang Film Lawas Ermina Zaenah, Aktris Primadona Era 50-an Idola Bung Karno". iNews.ID (in Indonesian).
