= Apa Jang Kau Tjari, Palupi? =

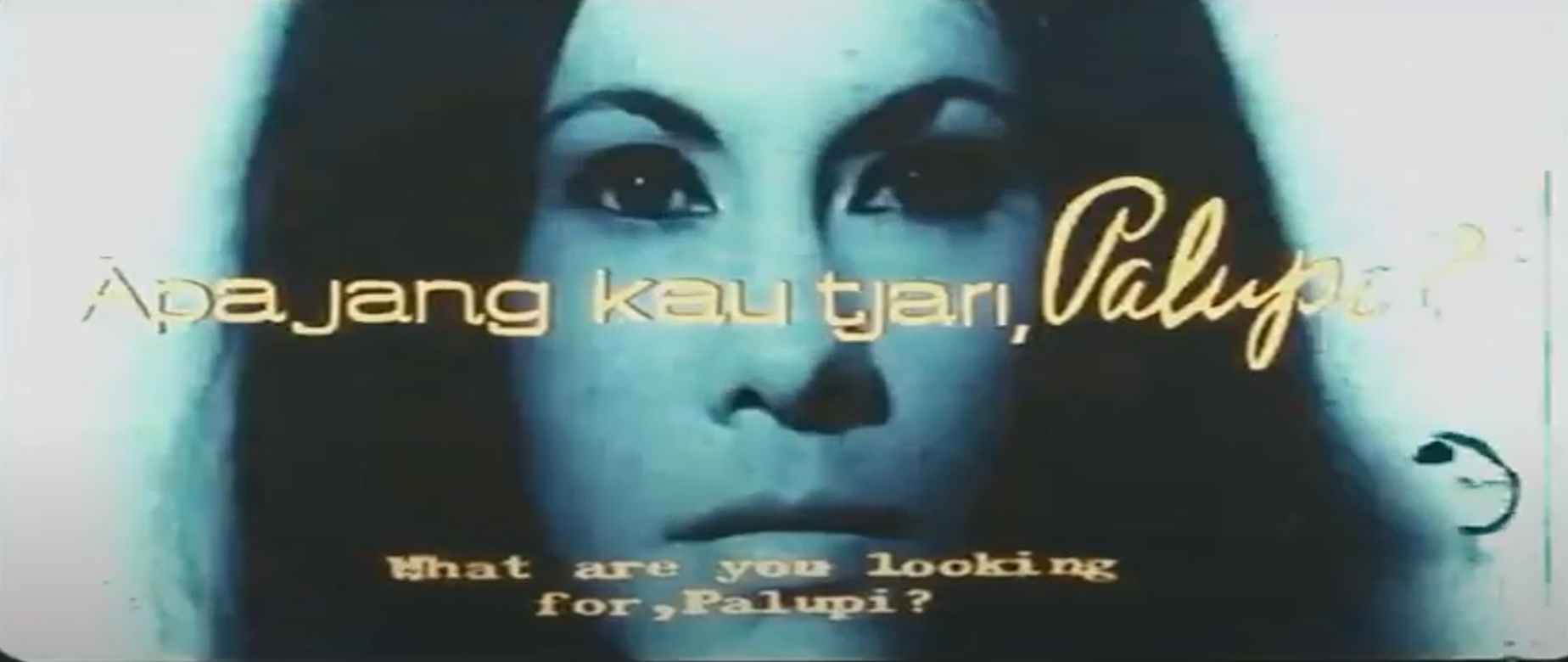
- Directed by: Asrul Sani
- Written by: Satyagraha Hoerip
- Starring: Farida Sjuman; Pitrajaya Burnama; Ismed M. Noor; Widyawati; Sandy Suwardi Hassan; Paula Rumokoy
- Release date: 1969
- Running time: 127 minutes
- Country: Indonesia
- Language: Indonesian

Apa Jang Kau Tjari, Palupi? (EYD: Apa Yang Kau Cari, Palupi?; English: What Are You Looking For, Palupi?) is a 1969 Indonesian drama film directed by Asrul Sani.

Produced by the National Film Production Board, the movie was Sani's third. It is centered around the titular character Palupi and her struggle to enter the Indonesian film industry, along with ensuing love affairs. Although it was well-received by critics and influenced later movies, the film was a commercial failure and failed to recoup its production costs.

== Plot ==
The movie begins with Palupi, the titular character, watching a film featuring herself in a cinema. Her companions, including filmmaker Chalil, comment on Palupi's age, to her dismay. Most of the movie is presented as a flashback leading to the opening scene.

Palupi is an ambitious woman with dreams of becoming a movie star, married to the idealistic artist Haidar. Disliking her marriage, she meets Chalil and quickly falls for the filmmaker. In one scene, Palupi swims nude with Chalil, not showing any hesitation. She later features in one of his movies, enjoying the fame that follows. She proceeds to divorce Haidar and marry Chalil, but soon breaks up with Chalil as well to marry Sugito, a rich businessman. However, Sugito cheats on Palupi, leaving her distraught.

As the flashback ends, the movie returns to the cinema. Palupi leaves, with Chalil trying to follow her. She enters an unfamiliar party and becomes disoriented there as the movie concludes.

== Cast ==
- Farida Syuman as Palupi
- Pitrajaya Burnama as Chalil
- Ismed M. Noor as Haidar
- Aedy Moward as Sugito
- Paula Rumokoy as Sofi

== Production ==
Apa Jang Kau Tjari, Palupi? was one of several movies produced by the government-organized National Film Production Board, and was the third movie directed by Asrul Sani. It was based on writer Satyagraha Hoerip's script Palupi. The movie had a production budget of Rp 30 million at the time.

The character Chalil is partly based on Sani himself, and was one of the first movies in independent Indonesia to feature nudity. The movie heavily featured "Western" music, following the political transition ongoing in Indonesia at that time.

== Reception and impact ==
The movie won the best movie award at the 1970 Asian Film Festival. Despite the award, the movie was a commercial failure and did not recoup its production cost. It did, however, inspire other filmmakers such as Usmar Ismail to show Jakarta as a glitzy underworld; this image later inspired a number of the so-called "prostitution films". Media historian Krishna Sen summarised the reception of the movie as "hailed by Indonesian critics as an art film, rejected by the audience as too arty, and shown around the world as an example of Indonesia's film culture".
