= Sesuatu yang Indah =

1976 film by Wim Umboh

Sesuatu yang Indah (Something Beautiful) is a 1976 Indonesian drama film directed and written by Wim Umboh. It stars Yatie Octavia, Sophan Sophiaan, Robby Sugara, WD Mochtar and Marini.
