= Albertus Samuel Pinke =

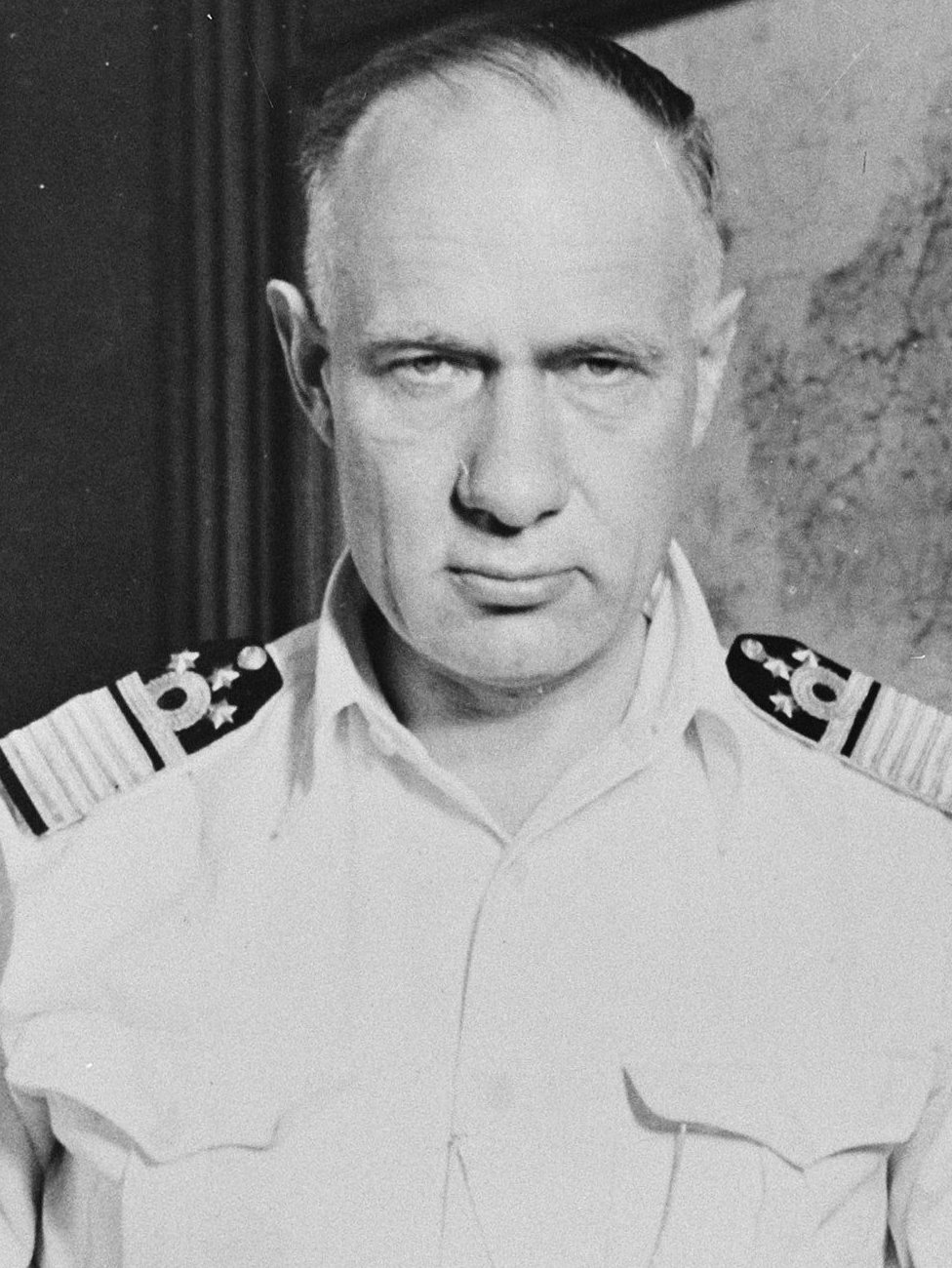
- Born: Albertus Samuel Pinke; 14 October 1894; Heerde, Netherlands
- Died: 8 July 1966
- Military career
- Allegiance: Netherlands
- Branch: Royal Netherlands Navy
- Rank: Vice Admiral
- Commands: Commander of the naval forces in the Dutch East Indies
- Conflicts: Indonesian War of Independence

Albertus Samuel "Ab" Pinke (14 October 1894 – 8 July 1966) was a vice admiral in the Royal Netherlands Navy (RNLN). Between 25 January 1946 and 30 September 1949 he was commander of the naval forces in the Dutch East Indies, during the Indonesian War of Independence.

== Early life ==
Albertus Samuel Pinke was born on 14 October 1894 in Heerde, the Netherlands, as son of Frederik Pinke and Johanna Maria Willemina Carpentier Alting. Frederik Pinke was a naval officer in the Royal Netherlands Navy who served between 1 May 1912 and 1 February 1914 as commander of the naval forces in the Dutch East Indies.

== Military career ==
=== Interwar Period ===
In 1928 Pinke was part of a supervisory committee that observed the testing of a new bubble capture system that Inkavos had developed to eliminate bubbles when firing torpedoes from torpedo tubes. During his time on the committee he observed the trials aboard the HNLMS O 6 and contributed to the final report in which it was concluded that the system did not meet expectations.

=== Indonesian War of Independence ===
On 25 January 1946 Pinke was appointed commander of the naval forces in the Dutch East Indies as replacement for Conrad Helfrich. As commander naval forces Dutch East Indies he repeatably urged the Dutch government to strengthen the presence of the Royal Netherlands Navy in the Dutch East Indies during the Indonesian War of Independence. In particular he wanted the RNLN to perform patrol tasks to stop the smuggling of weapons and infiltration by Republican forces. He also firmly opposed transferring these patrol tasks to the Dienst van Scheepsvaart. Furthermore, he warned of the dangers that a foreign country could potentially start supporting the Republican forces with equipment if the fight dragged on too long, which might shift the power balance.
