= Karet Bivak Cemetery =

Cemetery in Jakarta, Indonesia

Karet Bivak
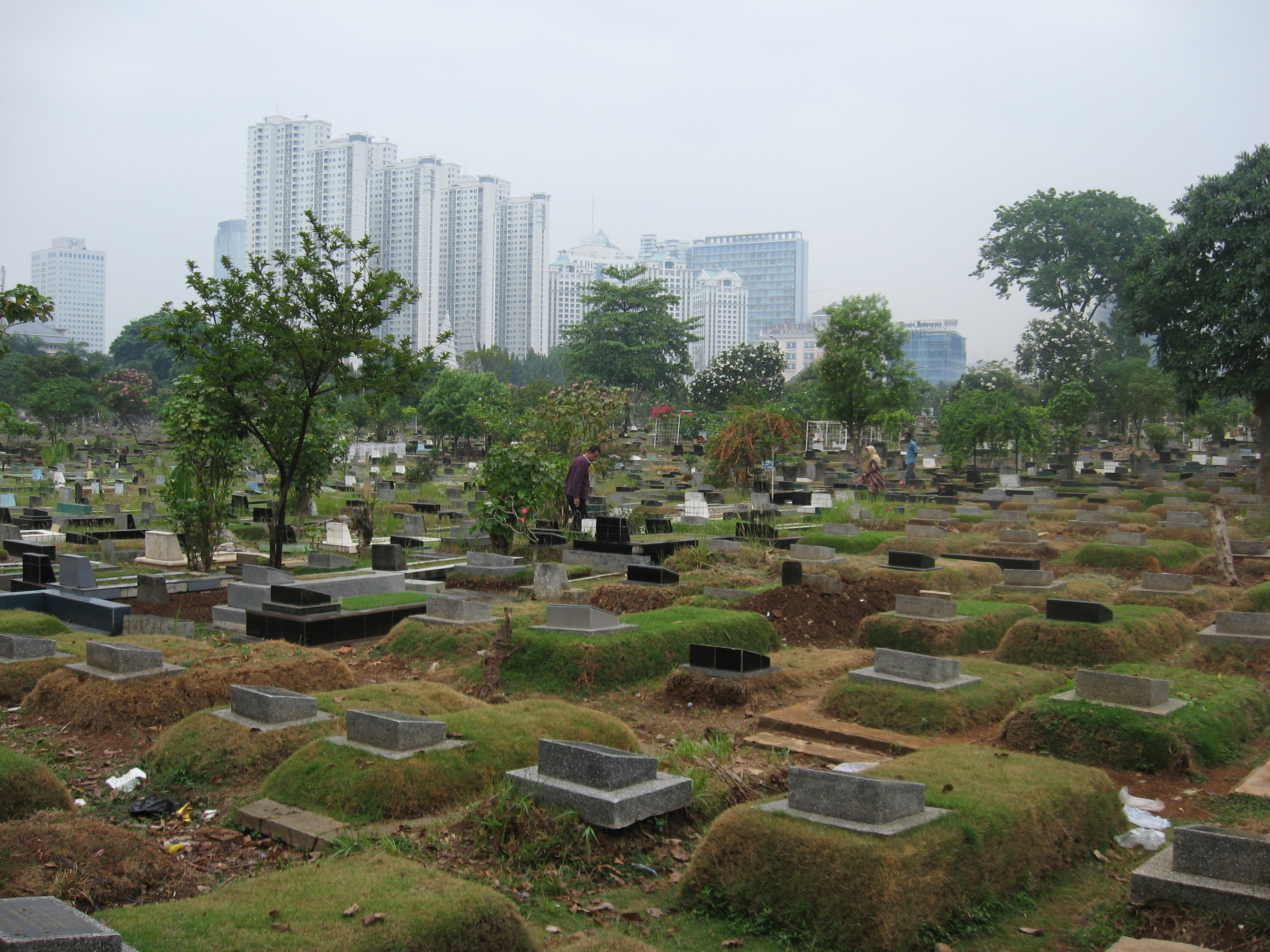
- Several graves in Karet Bivak
- Interactive map of Karet Bivak

Details
- Location: Central Jakarta
- Country: Indonesia
- Coordinates: 6.20269°S 106.81410°E
- Type: Public
- Size: 16.2 hectares (0.16 km^{2}; 0.06 sq mi)
- No. of graves: Approximately 48,000

Karet Bivak is a cemetery in Jakarta, Indonesia. It is the second largest public graveyard in the city.

== Description ==
Karet Bivak is located in Central Jakarta, Jakarta. It covers an area of 16.2 hectares (0.16 km^{2}; 0.06 sq mi), making it the second-largest cemetery in Jakarta. In 2007 it contained approximately 48,000 graves. The graves of poor people are located in a special block at the back of the graveyard.

As of 2007, the cemetery is at full capacity. To deal with the lack of graveyard space, common throughout Jakarta, families have begun using a single plot for several family members, stacking them on top of each other. Another method proposed is reassigning the 18,000 graves that have been abandoned or have had their lease run out.

Maintenance is done by self-employed gravekeepers, who receive funds from the families of those interred. The gravekeepers generally do not attend to the graves of families who do not pay them. Although the cemetery is often devoid of visitors, during Ramadhan, the cemetery is often filled with pilgrims and families visiting the dead.

== History ==
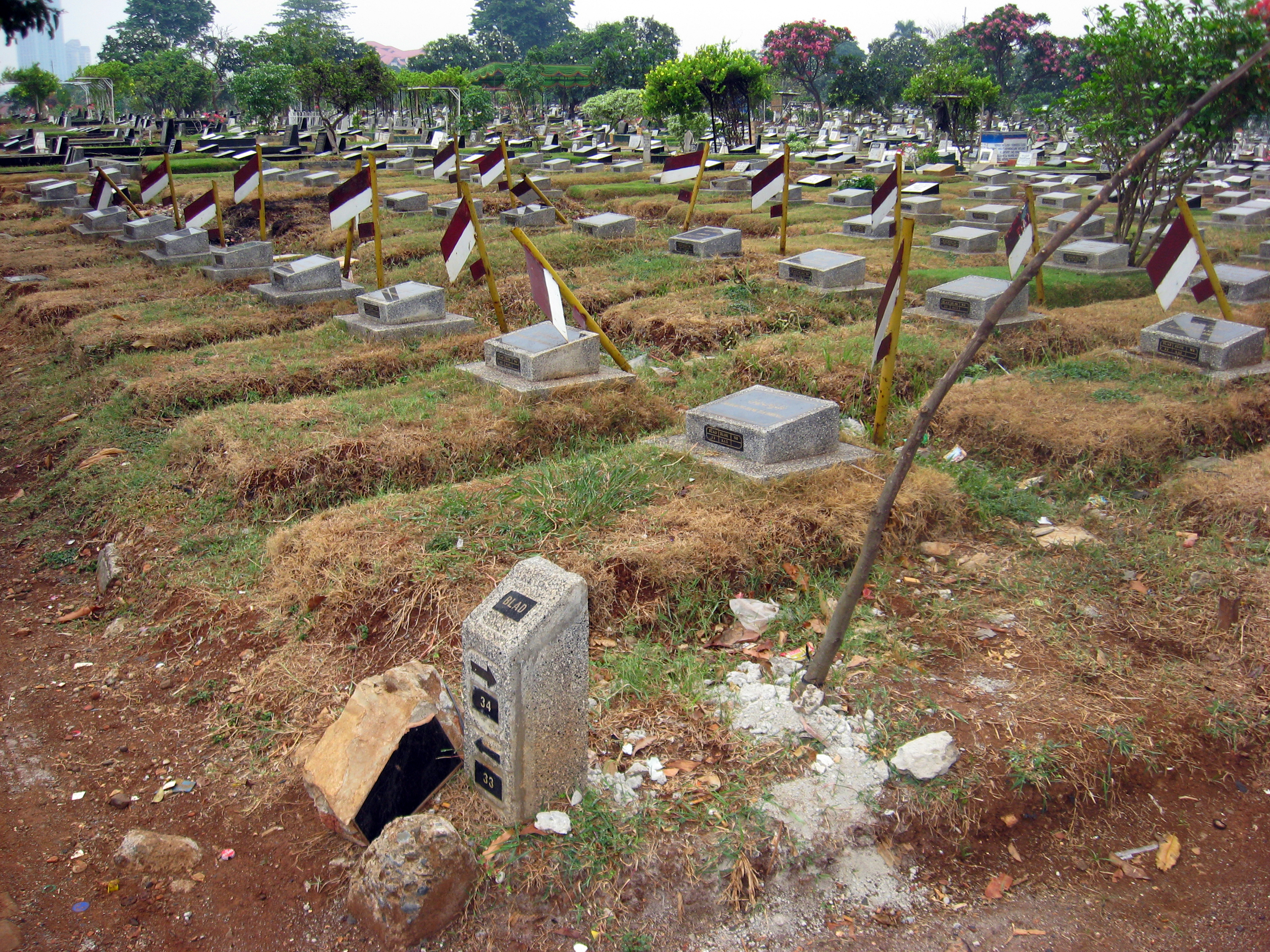
Graves of nationalist revolutionaries

In 2009 the government of Jakarta began the plakatisasi program to ensure the graves in Karet Bivak followed the rules for gravestones as outlined by a 2007 bylaw. By September 2009 the government had replaced 2,000 graves with plain gray tombstones and grassy mounds. The head of the Jakarta Parks and Cemetery Agency, Ery Basworo, noted that the program was also to improve water retention in the city and to eliminate the “spooky” perception of cemeteries. Although the government stated that families were notified, some families of those interred were not. The mass-produced new gravestones at times misspelled the names of the interred.

== Notable interments ==
- Abraham Lunggana, politician
- Benyamin Sueb, actor, comedian, and singer
- Bing Slamet, actor, comedian, singer, and songwriter
- Chairil Anwar, poet
- Chairul Saleh, politician
- Guruh Sukarnoputra, artist and youngest son of Sukarno
- Fatmawati, wife of Sukarno and National Hero of Indonesia
- HIM Damsyik, dancer and actor
- Hadi Thayeb, diplomat and co-founder of the Ministry of Foreign Affairs
- Ismail Marzuki, composer
- Iwan Tirta, batik fashion designer
- Lies Noor, actress
- Mohammad Hoesni Thamrin, nationalist and National Hero of Indonesia
- Rachmawati Sukarnoputri, lawyer and politician, daughter of Sukarno
- Sumitro Djojohadikusumo, economist
- Trisno Sumardjo, writer and painter
