= Menteng Pulo War Cemetery =

Dutch war cemetery in Jakarta, Indonesia

Dutch Field of Honor Menteng Pulo
- Nederlands Ereveld Menteng Pulo; Makam Kehormatan Belanda di Menteng Pulo
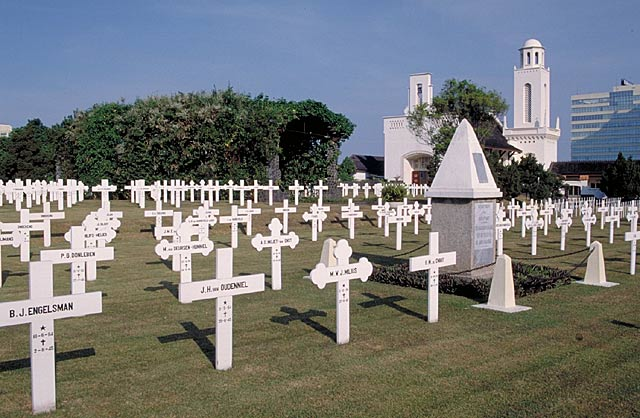
- Menteng Pulo War Cemetery
- Interactive map of Dutch Field of Honor Menteng Pulo

Details
- Location: Tebet, Jakarta
- Country: Indonesia
- Coordinates: 6°13′20″S 106°50′22″E
- Type: War cemetery
- Owned by: Netherlands War Graves Foundation
- Size: 29,000 m^{2} (310,000 sq ft)
- No. of graves: Approximately 4,300

Menteng Pulo War Cemetery, also Dutch Field of Honor Menteng Pulo (Dutch: Nederlands Ereveld Menteng Pulo, Indonesian: Makam Kehormatan Belanda di Menteng Pulo), is a war cemetery at Jl. Menteng Pulo RT. 3 RW. 12, Menteng Dalam, Tebet, Jakarta in Indonesia. It is one of two Dutch war cemeteries in Jakarta, the other one is Ancol War Cemetery at Ancol. Menteng Pulo War Cemetery was built to accommodate the victims of the war from the Japanese occupation during World War II. At present it is maintained by the Netherlands War Graves Foundation, which is an organization that manages all Dutch war cemeteries in the world.

== History ==
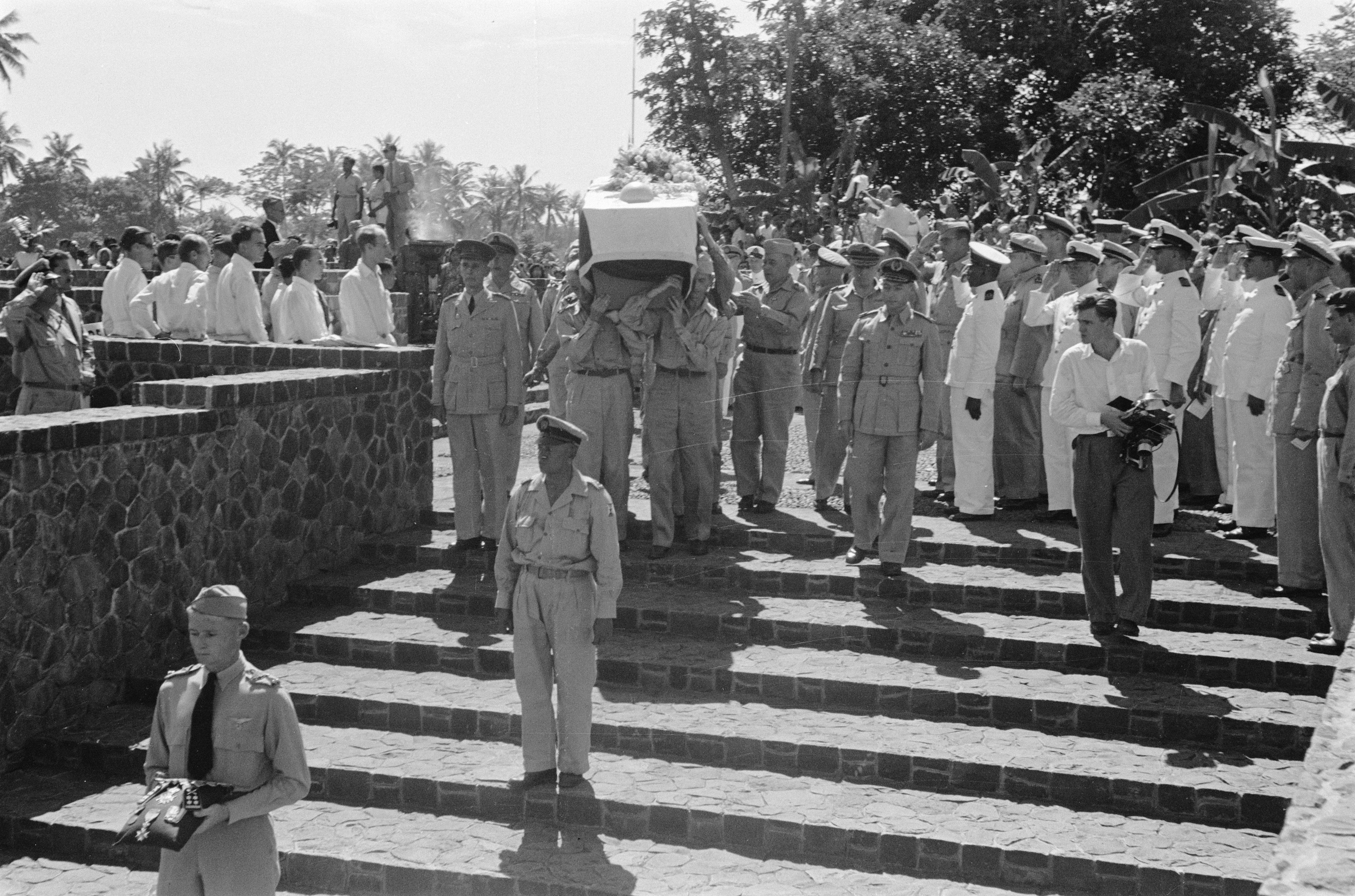
Burial of General Simon Spoor

It was built on L-shaped waqf land provided by the Djakarta government at that time. Menteng Pulo War Cemetery was designed on 7 December 1946 by the architect Hugo Anthonius van Oerle, who served as a lieutenant colonel in the First Division of the Royal Netherlands Army. The laying of the first foundation was carried out by Lieutenant General Simon Spoor, who at that time was the highest ranking Dutch military leader in the Indonesian archipelago. There are about 4,300 graves of Royal Netherlands East Indies Army (KNIL) members who were killed during the Indonesian War of Independence, and victims of the atrocities in Japanese-run internment camps during World War II. Not only ethnic Dutch, but also native Indonesian KNIL members were buried here. From 1946 to 1950, there were only 22 graves. However, since 1960, Menteng Pulo has become a tomb for bodies that have been moved from several regions in Indonesia such as Banjarmasin, Tarakan, Balikpapan, Manado, Makassar, Palembang, and Cililitan. The graves in this cemetery are arranged in eighteen blocks. Most of the KNIL soldiers who had perished and had been buried in Australia, they were moved to Jakarta and reinterred here throughout November 1950. This included soldiers originally from Surinam and the Dutch Caribbean.

Besides the thousands of tombs of victims of the Second World War, at Ereveld Menteng Pulo there are several monuments that are characteristic. The two buildings are the Simultaan Church in which there are crosses from bearing rails taken from the Burmese stretch of the Thai–Burma Railway. The church is not only used for prayers, but also as a place of commemoration and ceremonies for all religions, as well as the Columbarium which stores ashes of 754 Dutch military personnel who died as prisoners of war.
