= Laki-Laki Tak Bernama =

- Theatrical poster
- Directed by: Achmad Salim
- Written by: Achmad Salim
- Produced by: Annie Mambo
- Starring: Ratno Timoer; Rahayu Effendi; Rima Melati; Rachmat Kartolo; W.D. Mochtar; Gaby Mambo
- Cinematography: Lukman Hakim Nain
- Edited by: Achmad Salim
- Music by: Idris Sardi
- Production company: Aries Film
- Release date: 1969 (Indonesia)
- Country: Indonesia
- Language: Indonesian

Laki-Laki Tak Bernama (Indonesian for Man Without a Name) is a 1969 Indonesian film directed by Achmad Salim.

== Plot ==
Laki-Laki Tak Bernama shows a number of scenes related to sexuality, including a cheating wife and husband.

== Production ==
Laki-Laki Tak Bernama was written and directed by Wim Umboh (also known as Achmad Salim) for Annie Mambo's Aries Film. The film was shot by Lukman Hakim Nain in CinemaScope and Eastmancolor. Idris Sardi provided the music, while Umboh handled editing. According to Tempo, the film was rumored to have been shot without a screenplay.

The film starred Ratno Timoer, Rahayu Effendi, Rima Melati, Rachmat Kartolo, W.D. Mochtar, and Gaby Mambo. Supporting roles were held by Farida Arriany, Farouk Afero, Hamid Gruno, Paula Rumokoy, Sandy Suwardi Hassan, Sofia WD, Tien Samatha, Jeffry Sani, Boes Boestami, A. Hamid Arief, and Dicky Zulkarnaen. This was Melati's first film role after a five year hiatus, as well as the last role of Boestami, who died two years later.

== Release and reception ==
Laki-Laki Tak Bernama was released in 1969. It was advertised as the first Indonesian sex film, as well as "the only National film that is the bravest and biggest . . . . with SEX scenes which are explicit without pulling any punches". The poster featured images of kissing and a woman undressing, and urged viewers to take their girlfriends to see the film.

J.B. Kristanto, in his catalogue of Indonesian films, writes that, though Laki-Laki Tak Bernama builds its characters sufficiently, the film's plot is convoluted and unclear.

== Works cited ==
- "FFI 1973 Jakarta: FFI pertama Benyamin dalam Intan" [IFF 1973 Jakarta: The First IFF for Benyamin in Intan]. Tempo (in Indonesian). Vol. 3. 7 April 1973.
- "Filmografi Boes Boestami" [Boes Boestami Filmography]. filmindonesia.or.id (in Indonesian). Konfiden Foundation. Archived from the original on 11 March 2016.
- Kristanto, JB, ed. (2007). Katalog Film Indonesia 1926–2007. Jakarta: Nalar. ISBN 978-979-26-9006-4.
- Laki-Laki Tak Bernama (poster) (in Indonesian), Aries Film, 1969
- "Rima Melati". Ensiklopedi Jakarta (in Indonesian). Jakarta: Jakarta City Government. Archived from the original on 13 August 2016.
- Woodrich, Christopher A. (March 2016). "Sexual Bodies, Sensual Bodies: Depictions of Women in Suharto-Era Indonesian Film Flyers (1966–1998)" (PDF). Indonesian Feminist Journal. 4 (1): 38–50. ISSN 2338-9362.
