= Kembang-Kembang Plastik =

- Movie poster
- Directed by: Wim Umboh
- Written by: Arifin C. Noer
- Produced by: Hakim Mansun
- Starring: Cok Simbara; Dien Novita; Maruli Sitompul; Roy Marten; Ully Artha; Yatie Octavia
- Cinematography: Lukman Hakim Nain
- Edited by: Eduart P. Sirait
- Music by: Nazar Ali
- Distributed by: Jaya Bersaudara Film
- Release date: 1977
- Running time: 110 min.
- Country: Indonesia
- Language: Indonesian

Kembang-Kembang Plastik (Plastic Flowers) is a 1977 Indonesian film directed by Wim Umboh. Starring Cok Simbara, Dien Novita, Maruli Sitompul, and Roy Marten, it details the lives of people living in a prostitution district in Semarang. It has interpreted as giving a sympathetic perspective of their plight, but received mixed reception.

== Plot ==
In the Sunan Kuning prostitution district in Semarang, Central Java, several prostitutes and criminals are living in close proximity. They are Lily (Yati Octavia), who wishes to marry and move away from the city; Ijan (Cok Simbara), a pickpocket and Lily's boyfriend, Mbah Genggong (Maruli Sitompul), an old robber who fought in the Indonesian National Revolution until he was betrayed; Yayuk (Ully Artha), who was forced into prostitution to deal with her husband's gambling debts; Mangapul (Roy Marten), an escaped felon who pretends to be rich; and Norma (Dien Novita), who nearly slept with her brother while working. In the district, the children imitate the adults' behaviour and kiss in the streets, men work as pickpockets in the city proper, and corrupt businessmen, politicians, and police officers hire the prostitutes.

Lily and Ijan plan to marry, but they do not have enough money to do so. When they are discussing it, Lily is interrupted by a customer who takes her to a room to have sex. Meanwhile, Yayuk and her husband are having marital difficulties as he continues to gamble and sleep with other women. The pickpockets steal a purse in town, but one is chased down and beaten to death by the crowd. Mangapul takes Yayak to a nearby warehouse for sex. They decide to marry, and after their tryst take leave of the brothel leader, then drive away for Surabaya.

Mbah Genggong leads his men, including Ijan, to rob a jewellery store owned by a Chinese-Indonesian man. The store-owner's wife tells them to take the jewellery, so long as she and her family are not harmed. The bandits agree, then take the goods and escape to their hideout in an old farmhouse. Ijan takes a pair of wedding rings, and sneaks away to give the rings to Lily before coming back. Meanwhile, the police arrest Mangapul; he promises to marry Yayak from inside prison.

After arresting Mangapul, the police go to Mbah Genggong's hideout. As the bandits flee, Mbah Genggong — who thinks he has been betrayed — kills Ijan with a blade and then attempts to attack the police, but is killed. As the district's residents come out and watch the police actions, Lily puts on her wedding ring.

== Production ==
Kembang-Kembang Plastik was directed by Wim Umboh, who was generally known for making romances. The story was adapted from a stage play by Arifin C. Noer. According to Umboh, the film was meant to have no primary protagonist, instead giving equal treatment to each of the main characters.

== Style and themes ==
Umboh described the film as being a look at the daily lives of Indonesian prostitutes, from a warm and sympathetic perspective. Actors adopted Javanese or Batak accents. Andreas Weiland, reviewing for the Taiwanese film magazine Influence, wrote that the film was comparable to Glauber Rocha's 1969 film O Dragão da Maldade Contra o Santo Guerreiro (The Dragon of Evil Against the Warrior Saint) in that they were in a similar style, including the inclusion of bandits and use of music and colour.

Umboh, as usual for him, used mainly medium and close-up shots; Noer considered the effect overdone, and wrote that the film could have been improved with longer-range shots. The film is interspersed with songs, both traditional and modern.

Mangunharso, in a review in Suara Merdeka, suggested that the character of Mbah Genggong was included to show that people considered useful to their country can fall, and that those who are prostitutes now could have been something else had their lives taken a different turn. He also noted that a strong sense of mystery pervaded the film. Weiland noted a strong sense of social commentary about poverty.

== Release and reception ==
The film was released in 1977. It was shown at the Taipei International Film Festival the following year. At the 1978 Indonesian Film Festival, it was runner up for best editing.

A review for Tempo magazine argued that Umboh was unfit to direct the film, as his realistic approach did not do justice to the original play; however, the robbery scene was said to be well-done. Noer also wrote that Umboh's approach was too realistic for the material. Mangunharso wrote that the film was intriguing, but complained that towards the end it began to focus too much on Mbah Genggong. Weiland described it as "a film that carries you away by its filmic rhythm and stops often enough to give you time to think."
