= Max Tera =

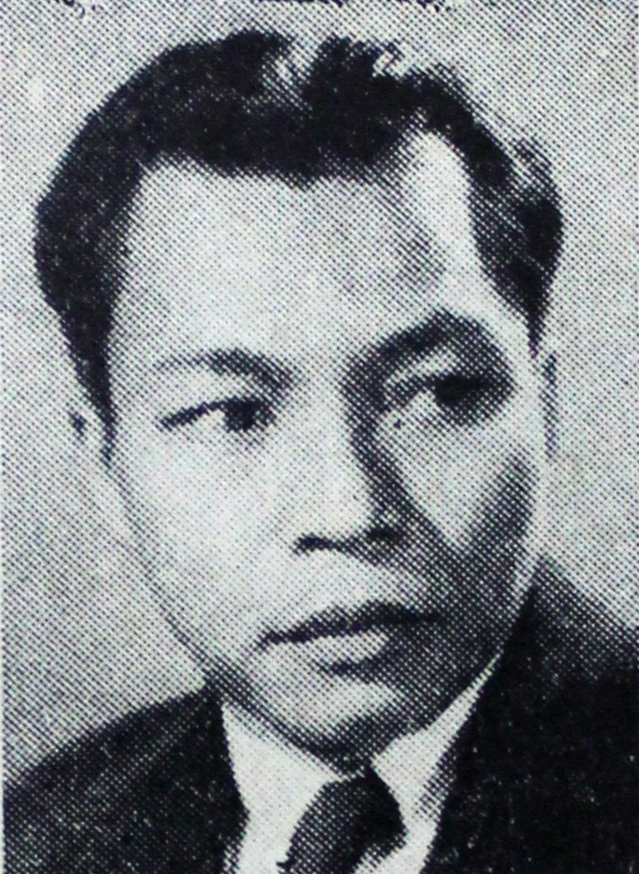
Tera, 1960

Max Tera (25 October 1920 – 1 October 1992) was an Indonesian cinematographer and editor. He was employed by PERFINI in the 1950s and was a frequent collaborator with director Usmar Ismail.

== Biography ==
Tera was born on 25 October 1920 in Madiun, East Java, Dutch East Indies. He continued his education until junior high school, later becoming a photographer.

Around 1948, during the Indonesian National Revolution, Tera joined the Dutch-owned production company South Pacific Film Corporation, where he studied cinematography under the Dutch cameraman AA Denninghoff-Stelling. With South Pacific, Tera served as assistant cinematographer for several productions, including Djaoeh Dimata (1948), Gadis Desa, Harta Karun, and Tjitra (all 1949). It was while working there Tera met Usmar Ismail, who was the director of Harta Karun and Tjitra.

After the end of the revolution in December 1949, Ismail began work on Darah dan Doa (The Long March; 1950). Tera was asked to join the production. Shooting began on 30 March 1950, a date which is now celebrated as National Film Day in Indonesia. After the film was released, it was ultimately unsuccessful. Despite this, Tera remained with Ismail's company Perfini, later training several of its cameramen, including Kosnen, R. Husein, and Kasdullah.

In the 1960s Tera began working for films by other companies, with Perfini's permission. In his later years Tera worked freelance, both for money and because he felt he was destined to be a cinematographer. He made his last film, Nuansa Birunya Rinjani, in 1989. In 1990 Tera was awarded an Usmar Ismail Prize for his contributions to Indonesia's cinema. He died in Jakarta on 1 October 1992.

== Filmography ==
During his forty-one-year career Tera was involved in some 56 productions, mostly as cinematographer. The following is a list of his works; positions other than head cinematographer are noted.

- Djaoeh Dimata (Far from the Eyes; 1948) – assistant cinematographer
- Gadis Desa (Maiden from the Village; 1949) – assistant cinematographer
- Tjitra (Image; 1949) – assistant cinematographer
- Harta Karun (Treasure; 1949) – assistant cinematographer
- Darah dan Doa (The Long March; 1950)
- Enam Djam Di Djogdja (Six Hours in Jogja; 1951) – also editor
- Embun (Dew; 1951)
- Dosa tak Berampun (Unforgivable Sins; 1951)
- Terimalah Laguku (Take My Song; 1952)
- Lewat Djam Malam (After the Curfew; 1953)
- Krisis (Crisis; 1953)
- Kafedo (1953)
- Harimau Tjampa (Tiger from Tjampa; 1953)
- Putri dari Medan (Daughter of Medan; 1954)
- Mertua Sinting (Crazy Inlaws; 1954)
- Tamu Agung (Grand Guest; 1955)
- Tiga Dara (Three Girls; 1956)
- Lagi-lagi Krisis (Crisis, Again and Again; 1956) – also editor
- Delapan Pendjuru Angin (Eight Ways of the Wind; 1957)
- Pedjuang (Warriors for Freedom; 1960)
- Amor dan Humor (Love and Humour; 1961)
- Toha, Pahlawan Bandung Selatan (Toha, Hero of South Bandung; 1961)
- Anak Perawan di Sarang Penjamun (Maiden in the Bandits' Nest; 1962)
- Bajangan Diwaktu Fadjar (Shadows at Dawn; 1962)
- Anak-anak Revolusi (Children of the Revolution; 1964)
- Liburan Seniman (Artist's Holiday; 1965)
- Hantjurnya Petualang (Destruction of a Wanderer; 1966)
- Tikungan Maut (Deadly Turn; 1966)
- Kasih Diambang Maut (Love on the Verge of Danger; 1967)
- Mahkota (Crown; 1967)
- Mutiara Hitam (Black Pearl; 1967)
- Ja Mualim (1968)
- Big Village (1969)
- Seriti Emas, Kipas Sutra (The Swallow; 1971)
- Romusha (1972)
- Samtidar (1972)
- Seribu Janji Kumenanti (I Await a Thousand Promises; 1972)
- Titienku Sayang (Titien My Darling; 1972)
- Ayah (Father; 1973)
- Bulan di Atas Kuburan (Moon Over the Grave; 1973)
- Mystery in Hongkong (1974)
- Hamidah (1974)
- Dasar Rezeki (Source of Funds; 1974)
- Tetesan Air Mata Ibu (Mother's Tears; 1974)
- Kenapa Kau Pergi (Why Did You Go; 1975)
- Bukit Perawan (Virgin Hill; 1976)
- Juara Karate (Karate Champion; 1977)
- Misteri 8 Pendekar (Mystery of the 8 Warriors; 1977)
- Cintaku Tergadai (My Love's Been Pawned; 1977)
- Pendekar Kelelawar (The Bat Warrior; 1978)
- Bulan Madu (Honeymoon; 1979)
- Untukmu Indonesiaku (For You, My Indonesia; 1980)
- Jeritan Malam (Cry in the Night; 1981)
- Hukum Karma (Rule of Karma; 1982)
- Lara Jonggrang (Candi Prambanan) (Lara Jonggrang (Prambanan Temple); 1983)
- Nuansa Birunya Rinjani (Blue Tones of Rinjani; 1989)
