= D. Djajakusuma =

Indonesian film director and promoter of traditional art forms (1918–1987)

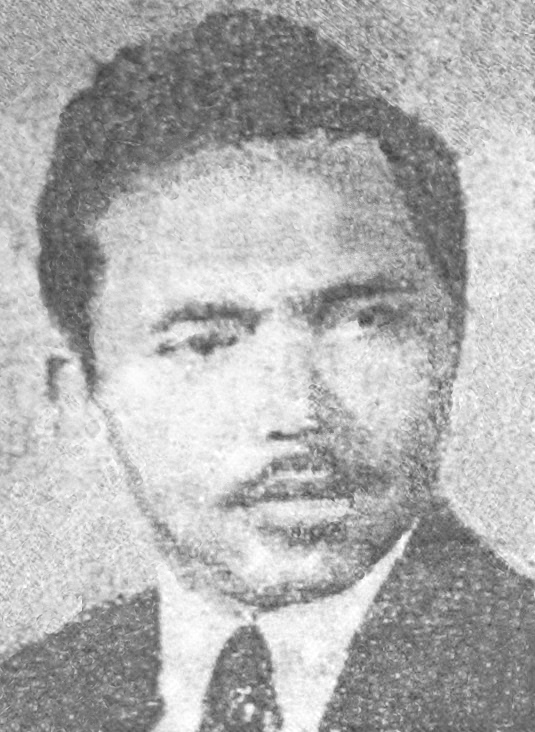
- Djajakusuma, c. 1950s
- Born: Djadoeg Djajakusuma; 1 August 1918; Temanggung, Central Java, Dutch East Indies
- Died: 28 October 1987 (aged 69); Jakarta, Indonesia
- Resting place: Karet Bivak Cemetery
- Education: University of Washington; USC School of Cinematic Arts
- Occupations: Director, producer, cultural critic
- Years active: 1952–1987

Djadoeg Djajakusuma (Note: Other spellings of his first name include Djadug, Djadoek, and Djaduk, while his last name may also be spelled Djajakoesoema) ([dʒaˈdʊʔ dʒajakuˈsuma]; 1 August 1918 – 28 October 1987) was an Indonesian film director and promoter of traditional art forms. Born to a nobleman and his wife in Temanggung, Central Java, Djajakusuma became interested in the arts at a young age, choosing to pursue a career in theatre. During the Japanese occupation from 1943 to 1945 he was a translator and actor, and in the four-year national revolution which followed he worked for the military's educational division, several news agencies, and in drama.

In 1951, Djajakusuma joined the National Film Corporation (Perfini) at the invitation of Usmar Ismail. After making his directorial debut with Embun, Djajakusuma released a further eleven films with the company before leaving in 1964. He then returned to traditional Indonesian theatre, including wayang. Although he continued to direct movies independently of Perfini, most of his energies were dedicated to promoting traditional art forms and teaching cinematography. After over a decade of poor health and high blood pressure, Djajakusuma collapsed during a ceremony and died. He was buried in Karet Bivak Cemetery.

The dedicated but easily angered Djajakusuma was influenced by Usmar Ismail's realist views, although he focused more on traditional aspects of life. His theatrical performances attempted to modernize traditional forms so that they could be better received in a modern world. He is credited with revitalising the Betawi theatre form lenong and received numerous awards for his filmmaking, including a lifetime achievement award at the Indonesian Film Festival.

== Biography ==
=== Early life ===
Djajakusuma was born on 1 August 1918 in Parakan, Temanggung, Central Java, Dutch East Indies, to a priyayi father, Raden Mas Aryo Djojokoesomo, and his wife Kasimah. Djajakusuma was the fifth child of six born to the couple, who lived comfortably off Djojokoesomo's salary as a government official. While young he enjoyed watching stage performances, such as wayang puppetry and the traditional dance form tayuban; at times he would furtively leave his home after bedtime to watch the productions. With his friends, he would act out the bedtime stories his mother told him. When imported Hollywood films began to be screened, he was an avid viewer, watching Westerns and works starring Charlie Chaplin.

Owing to his position as the son of a nobleman, Djajakusuma was able to receive an education. He completed his studies in Semarang, Central Java, graduating from the natural sciences programme at a senior high school there in 1941. Although his family hoped that he would become a government employee like his father, Djajakusuma decided to go into the performing arts. He returned to his hometown for a short time before realising that he would have little opportunity in Parakan. Accordingly, in early 1943 – almost a year after the Indies were occupied by the Empire of Japan – Djajakusuma moved to the colony's political centre, Jakarta, to find work.

Djajakusuma became employed at the Cultural Centre (Note: The Cultural Centre was known by both Indonesian and Japanese names. The Indonesian name was Poesat Keboedajaan, whereas the Japanese name was Keimin Bunka Shidōsho (啓民文化指導所). The Cultural Centre promoted the growth of various art forms, including film and drama, with the ultimate goal of providing propaganda for the Japanese political position (Hoerip 1995, p. 8).) as a translator and actor under Armijn Pane. Among the works he translated were several pieces by the Swedish playwright August Strindberg and Norwegian playwright Henrik Ibsen, (Note: Neither Norway nor Sweden was at war with Japan at the time, meaning such translations were considered acceptable by Djajakusuma's superiors (Hoerip 1995, p. 9).) as well as a history of Japan and several kabuki stage plays. While with the centre, Djajakusuma wrote several of his own stage plays. In his free time, Djajakusuma helped establish the amateur theatre company Maya, together with artists such as HB Jassin, Rosihan Anwar, and Usmar Ismail. The troupe, formed in response to a desire for greater artistic freedom, performed translations of European works and original works by Ismail and El Hakim. (Note: El Hakim was the pseudonym of Abu Hanifah (Hoerip 1995, pp. 9–10).) To promote a sense of Indonesian nationalism while still conforming with the Japanese censorship bureau's rules, several of Maya's plays did not explicitly promote Japan, but rather the Greater East Asia Co-Prosperity Sphere. Themes supporting the Indonesian nationalist movement, meanwhile, remained implicit in the works. With Maya, Djajakusuma travelled from village to village, putting on performances.

=== Indonesian National Revolution ===
President Sukarno proclaimed Indonesia's independence on 17 August 1945, days after the bombings of Hiroshima and Nagasaki. Expecting the Dutch colonial government to return, Djajakusuma and Ismail helped establish the Independent Artists (Seniman Merdeka) as a form of resistance. The group travelled throughout the city, spreading news of Indonesia's proclaimed independence while performing from an open-air truck. After the arrival of the Netherlands Indies Civil Administration, the group sometimes attempted to spy on the Europeans or hide information which would be considered useful to the returning Dutch forces. Owing to this dangerous work, Djajakusuma began carrying a pistol, and went to Banten to ask a kyai to make him impervious to bullets.

In early 1946, with the Dutch colonial forces in control of Jakarta, Djajakusuma fled to the new national capital at Yogyakarta. There, he spent a time with the national news agency Antara before joining the military's educational division, rising to the rank of captain. For the military Djajakusuma edited the weekly Tentara; he also contributed articles to Ismail's cultural magazine Arena. Despite his involvement in the press, he did not abandon the theatre; with Surjo Sumanto, he established a troupe which performed for soldiers and raised morale, sometimes travelling to the frontlines.

Djajakusuma was hired by the Ministry of Information in 1947 to teach at a school for the performance arts, the Mataram Entertainment Foundation (Stichting Hiburan Mataram). Through Mataram, he and Ismail were introduced to filmmakers Andjar Asmara, Huyung, and Sutarto; the two studied under these more established individuals. Meanwhile, Djajakusuma was put in charge of censoring radio broadcasts in Republican-held areas, a duty he held until the Dutch captured Yogyakarta on 19 December 1948. Djajakusuma fled the city, then met up with Republican forces. Using an old radio and a bicycle-powered generator, Djajakusuma listened to international news broadcasts and wrote them down; the information from these broadcasts was then printed in underground newspapers.

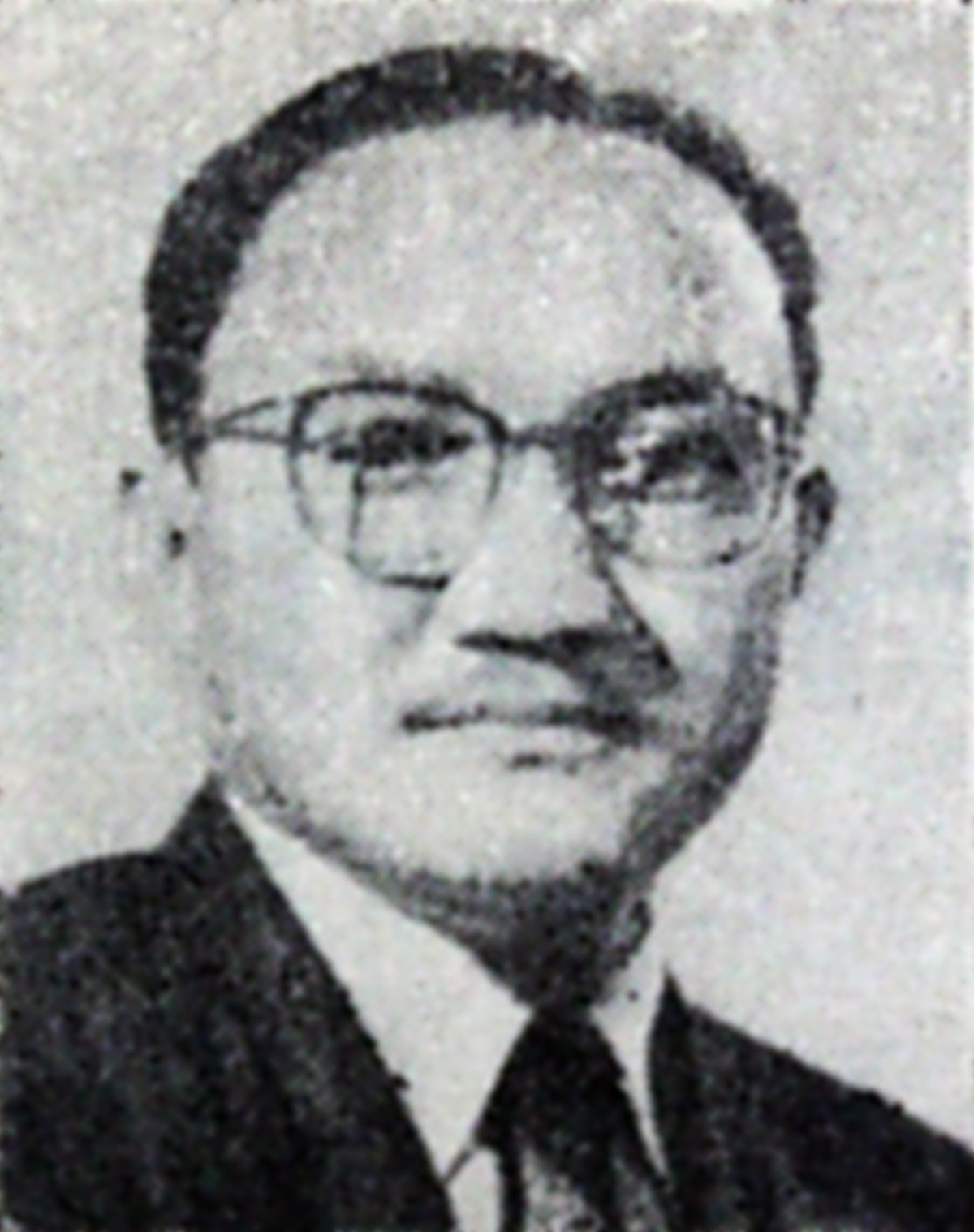
Usmar Ismail, who drew Djajakusuma to Perfini in 1951

After the Indonesian National Revolution ended with Dutch recognition of Indonesia's independence in 1949, Djajakusuma continued to work as a journalist for Patriot (a rebranding of Tentara) and the magazine Kebudajaan Nusantara; Mataram was reopened, and Djajakusuma began teaching there again while managing the Soboharsono cinema and writing several stage plays. Ismail, meanwhile, went back to Jakarta and established the National Film Corporation (Perusahaan Film Nasional, or Perfini); its first production, Darah dan Doa (The Long March), which gave a fictionalised version of the Siliwangi Division's trek from Yogyakarta to West Java in 1948, was directed by Ismail and released in 1950.

=== Career with Perfini ===
In preparation for his second film, Enam Djam di Jogja (Six Hours in Yogyakarta), Ismail recalled Djajakusuma to Jakarta. For the film, Djajakusuma helped Ismail adapt the General Assault of 1 March 1949 for the screen. Production was completed on a low budget; Djajakusuma later recalled that their camera had to be powered by a car battery. Despite this and other difficulties, Djajakusuma stayed on after the film's completion, completing another work for Perfini, Dosa Tak Berampun (Unforgivable Sin), later that year. Ismail served as director for this film, about a man who leaves his family after he is transfixed by the smile of a waitress.

While Ismail, who remained head of Perfini, went abroad to study cinematography at the School of Theater, Film and Television at the University of California, Los Angeles, Djajakusuma began taking a larger role in Perfini. He made his directorial debut in 1952 with Embun (Dewdrop), which showed the psychological troubles faced by soldiers upon returning to their village after the revolution. The film was shot in Wonosari, at the time in the middle of a drought, to provide a visual metaphor for the barren souls of the warriors. Because of its depiction of traditional superstitions, the film had trouble with both the censorship bureau and critics; superstition was considered incompatible with the new republic's need for modernisation. The release of Embun made Djajakusuma one of four directors to work for Perfini; the others were Ismail, Nya Abas Akup, and Wahyu Sihombing.

Djajakusuma's next production, Terimalah Laguku (Take My Song; 1952), was a musical about an old, impoverished musician who sells his saxophone to help his former student's career. Though the film's technical quality was poor, when he returned to Indonesia in 1953 Ismail was pleased with the work, stating that the editing had been done well. Over the next year Ismail conveyed information he learned at UCLA to the Perfini staff; Djajakusuma followed these lessons closely. This was followed by Harimau Tjampa (Tiger from Tjampa) in 1953, a film about a man who attempts to avenge his father's death. Set amidst Minang culture, the film featured some of the first nudity in a domestic production and was a considerable critical success.

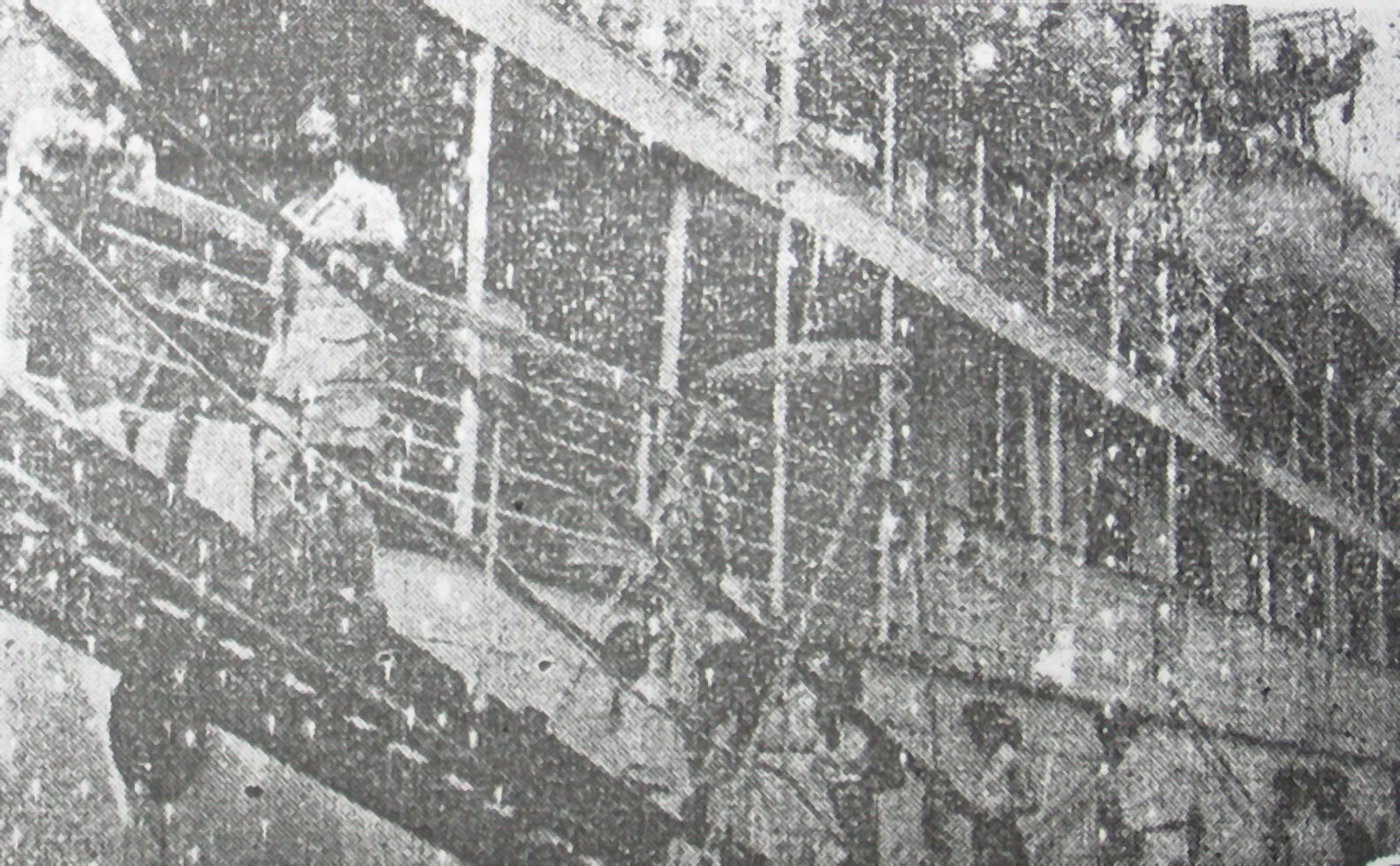
Djajakusuma boarding a ship to go to Sumatra for the filming of Arni, c. 1955

In 1954 Djajakusuma directed two comedies, Putri dari Medan (Daughter of Medan) and Mertua Sinting (Insane Parents-in-Law). The first dealt with three young men who resolve to never marry, only for their strength to waver after meeting some women from Medan, while the second followed a man who rejects his son's choice of spouse owing to her lack of noble descent, then unknowingly chooses the same woman to be his son's wife. The following year Djajakusuma helped establish the Indonesian Screen Actors Guild (Persatuan Artis Film Indonesia; PARFI). His only film that year, the drama Arni, told of a man who married another woman while his sick wife went to Padang, Sumatra, for treatment.

Djajakusuma studied cinematography in the United States, first at the University of Washington in Seattle, then at the University of Southern California's School of Cinematic Arts, from 1956 to 1957. When he returned to Indonesia, he worked with Ismail and fellow Perfini employee Asrul Sani to establish the National Theatre Academy of Indonesia (Akademi Teater Nasional Indonesia), which promoted realism; the Indonesian dramatist Putu Wijaya described the realism promoted by the academy as more Indonesian than Western, while Djajakusuma considered inspired by the Italian neorealist movement. Djajakusuma remained a lecturer with the academy until 1970, and his students considered him humorous and easy to approach.

Upon his return to Indonesia, Djajakusuma began work on Tjambuk Api (Whips of Fire; 1958), a critique of the widespread corruption in Indonesia; this theme led to the film being held by the censorship bureau for almost a year. The director followed this with the drama Pak Prawiro (Mr. Prawiro), which was sponsored by the Post Savings Bank (Bank Tabungan Pos) and meant to convey the importance of having savings. During this period he studied the traditional theatre of India, travelling to Calcutta, Madras, and New Delhi; he hoped that this first-hand experience would inspire him in the filming of traditional Indonesian stories.

In 1960 Djajakusuma released his first film based on traditional wayang stories, Lahirnja Gatotkatja; the traditional puppetry had fascinated him as a child, and he greatly enjoyed the character Gatotkaca. Shot in Yogyakarta, the film featured a cast of stars from Jakarta and local talent in backing roles. It was, however, controversial: dhalang and others versed in wayang argued that the director had ignored too many traditional aspects of the puppetry. That year Djajakusuma also served as production manager for Ismail's Pedjuang (Warriors for Freedom) and directed Mak Tjomblang (Mrs. Tjomblang), a comedy adapted from Nikolai Gogol's 1842 drama Marriage.

Djajakusuma released another comedy, Masa Topan dan Badai (Time of Cyclones and Storms), in 1963; the film centres around the family dynamics of a conservative father, liberal mother, and their two teenaged daughters who are in the throes of adolescence. The following year Djajakusuma directed his last film with Perfini, Rimba Bergema (Echoing Jungles), which was meant to promote the nation's rubber industry. That year he helped establish the Film and TV Employee's Union (Persatuan Karyawan Film dan TV), a response to the Lekra-sponsored Indonesian Film League. As with Ismail and most Perfini employees, Djajakusuma was staunchly against the communist-affiliated Lekra; the cultural group was likewise hostile towards those affiliated with Perfini.

=== Later career ===
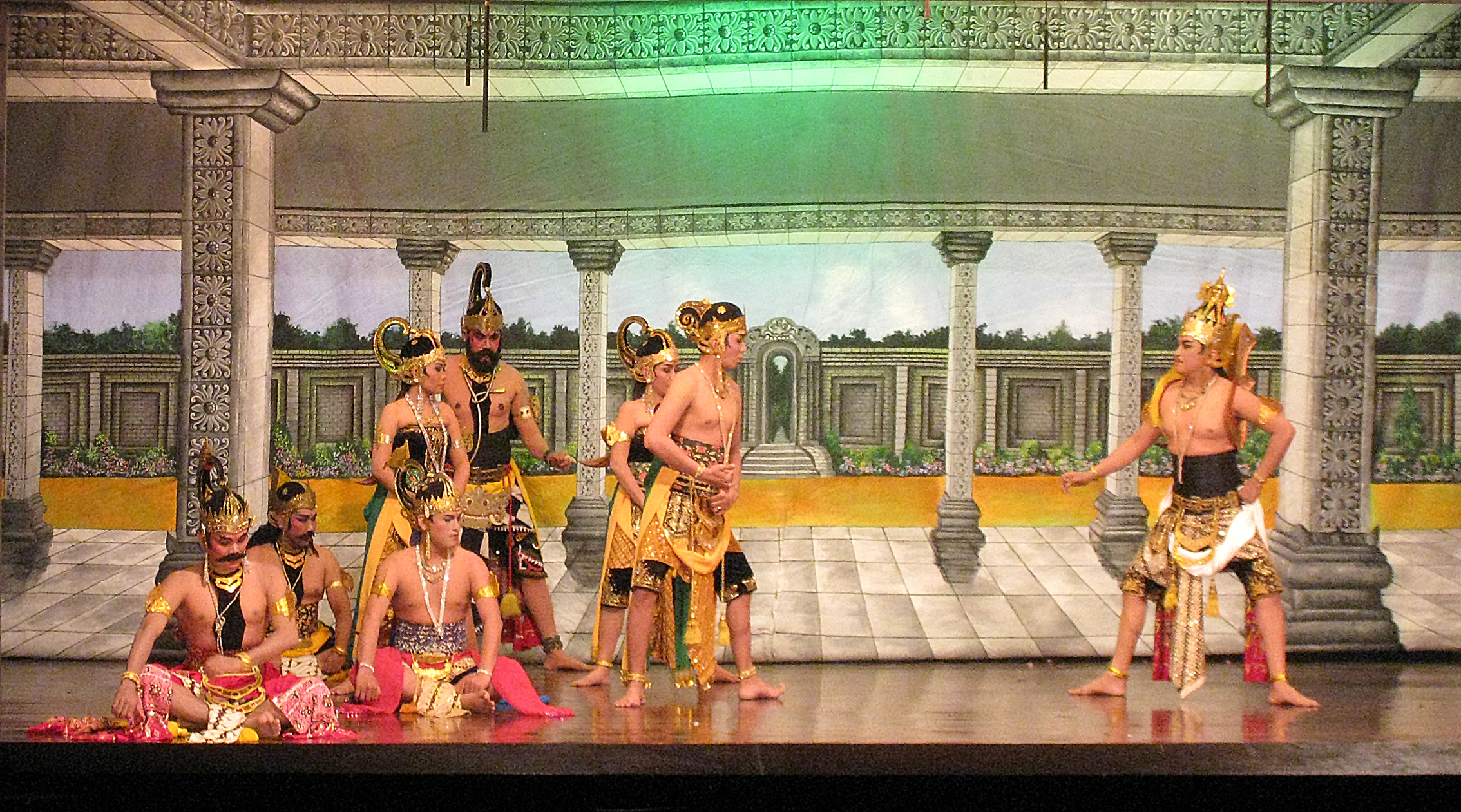
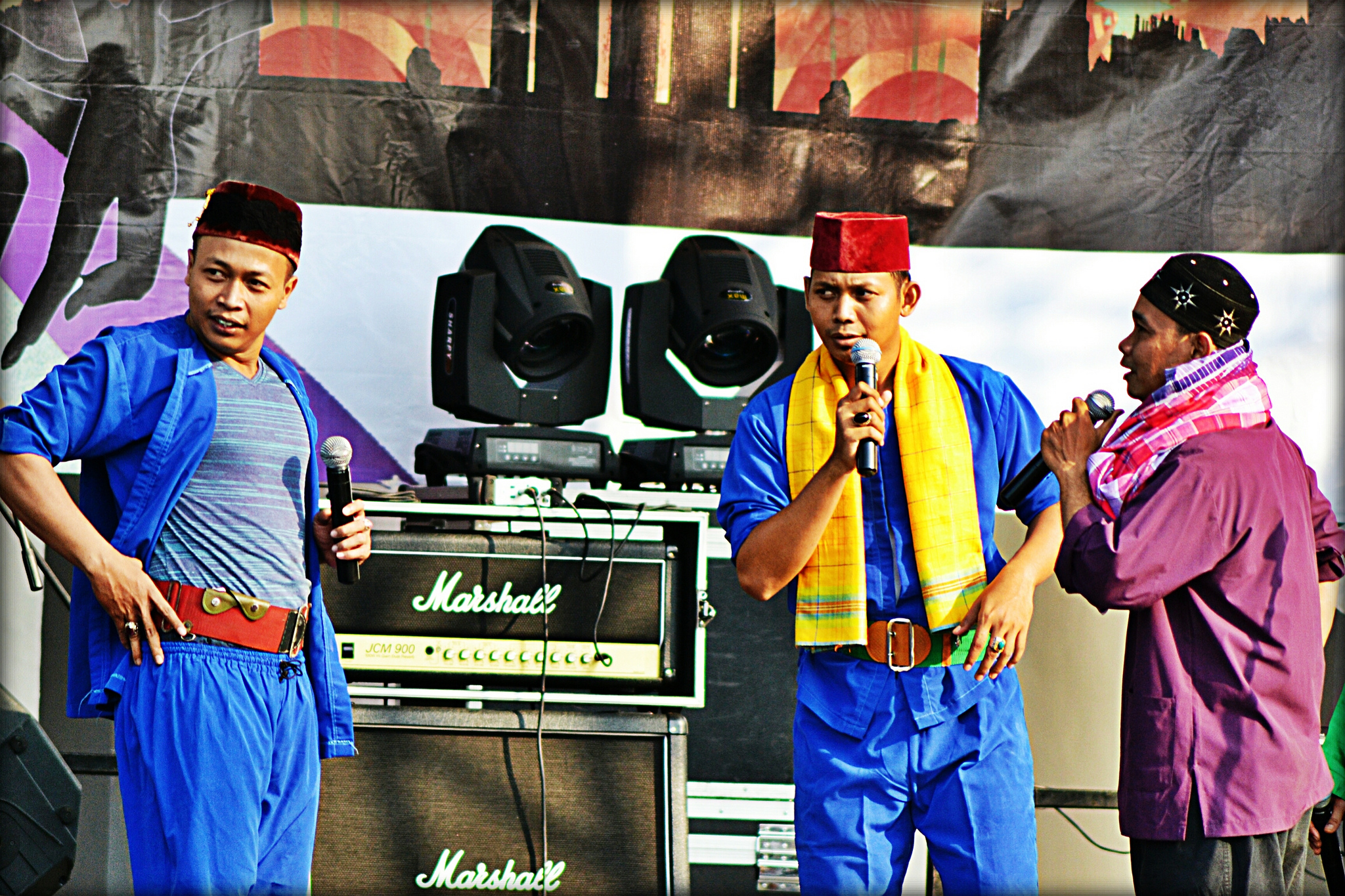
Djajakusuma promoted the modernisation of wayang orang (top) and the revitalisation of lenong.

Towards the end of his time with Perfini, Djajakusuma again became active in traditional arts. He devoted considerable time towards the promotion of wayang. In 1967 he organised the National Wayang Festival, which collapsed shortly afterwards owing to a lack of funds. In 1967 he directed the wayang-inspired film Bimo Kroda for Pantja Murti Film, which used the destruction of the Pandawa – brothers in the Hindu epic Mahābhārata – to represent the kidnappings and subsequent murders of five army generals during the 30 September Movement in 1965. Djajakusuma's involvement with wayang continued into the early 1970s; he organised two Wayang Weeks, in 1970 and 1974, as well as a national wayang festival in 1977. Furthermore, he established two wayang orang troupes, Jaya Budaya (1971) and Bharata (1973), hoping to save the ailing medium by modernising it.

Meanwhile, Djajakusuma helped promote art forms such as the Betawi lenong and Javanese ludruk over a period of several years. He is particularly recognised for his revitalising lenong. (Note: The Indonesian cultural scholar S. M. Ardan credits Djajakusuma as the driving force behind the revitalisation of lenong (Ardan 1987, Djaduk Djajakusuma), and the biographer Satyagraha Hoerip dedicates several pages to Djajakusuma's involvement with lenong, a level of detail matched only by his discussion of Djajakusuma's role in the modernisation of wayang orang. As with Ardan, he credits Djajakusuma with the revitalisation; unlike Ardan, he notes that two other cultural figures (Soemantri Sastro Suwondho and Ardan) also helped save the dramatic form (Hoerip 1995, pp. 69–73).) Beginning in 1968, Djajakusuma appeared on television as an advocate of lenong, which was then limited to rural villages and on the verge of dying out. He increased popular knowledge of the form while arguing for proper remuneration for performers. Through the 1970s lenong was performed at Ismail Marzuki Hall, drawing considerable audiences, and several lenong performers found mainstream acclaim in the film industry.

Djajakusuma also promoted non-traditional cultural activities, both modern and foreign. In 1968 he became the head of the Jakarta Art Council, a position he held until 1977, and in 1970 he held a kroncong music festival. Beginning with the school's establishment in 1970, he became a lecturer at the Jakarta Institute for Arts Education (Lembaga Pendidikan Kesenian Jakarta, later the Jakarta Art Institute [Institut Kesenian Jakarta, or IKJ]), teaching cinematography. To better understand the world's theatre, in 1977 he went to Japan and China to study their traditions. He later led the students in various stage performances, including adaptations of Japanese noh and Chinese opera; several of these performances were held at Ismail Marzuki Hall. In the 1970s Djajakusuma held a variety of positions in film organisations, including as a member of the Film Council (1974–76), a member of the board of trustees for Radio and TV Broadcasts (1976), and a member of the Bureau for the Development of National Film (1977–78).

Djajakusuma's productivity in the film industry, however, declined. In 1971 he directed his final films, Api di Bukit Menoreh (Fire on Mount Menoreh) and Malin Kundang (Anak Durhaka) (Malin Kundang [Faithless Child]). The first, released for Penas Film Studio and based on a novel by Singgih Hadi Mintardja, followed soldiers from the Kingdom of Pajang in their efforts to subdue soldiers from the rival kingdom of Jipang. The second film was an adaptation of the Malay folktale of the same name. Starring Rano Karno and Putu Wijaya as the title character, the film follows a young boy who forgets his roots after spending much of his childhood at sea. His last role as a filmmaker was in 1977, when he helped produce Fritz G. Schadt's comedy Bang Kojak (Brother Kojak; 1977).

=== Final years and death ===
In 1977 Djajakusuma served on the jury of the Indonesian Film Festival (Festival Film Indonesia, or FFI). (Note: Djajakusuma subsequently served on the jury several times (Panembahan 1987, Barangkali, 40 pCt Manusia).) While reading the decision, he collapsed and was rushed to the hospital, while Rosihan Anwar completed the reading. Djajakusuma's neighbour and frequent collaborator Taufiq Ismail told reporters that it was not the first time Djajakusuma had collapsed. Djajakusuma continued to suffer from bouts of sudden weakness for the rest of his life, caused by high blood pressure.

Despite his rapidly failing health, Djajakusuma remained active in the arts. In 1980 he made his last film appearance, and his only role on the big screen, acting in Ismail Soebardjo's Perempuan dalam Pasungan (Woman in Stocks). He and Sofia WD portrayed parents who regularly put their daughter in stocks to punish her for being disobedient; in an interview with Suara Karya, Soebardjo recalled that, from the time he had written it, he had only considered Djajakusuma for the role. Perempuan dalam Pasungan won the Citra Award for Best Film at the 1981 Indonesian Film Festival, and Djajakusuma expressed an interest in making several further films; this was, however, never realised. In 1983 Djajakusuma served as dean of the Faculty of Arts at IKJ, and in 1984 he went to the Three Continents Festival in Nantes, France, where two of his films were shown to critical acclaim.

In early 1987 Djajakusuma's doctor diagnosed him with heart disease, which led Djajakusuma to begin dieting and stop smoking. He continued to be highly respected in Indonesian film circles, but was displeased with the condition of the country's film industry, which he considered to be on the verge of collapse. This he blamed on American cultural imperialism, which meant that most cinemas preferred screening foreign films, especially those from Hollywood, and that Indonesian youth were no longer creating a uniquely Indonesian identity.

Djajakusuma collapsed on 28 October 1987 while giving a speech in commemoration of the Youth Pledge at the IKJ, striking his head on a stone step. After being rushed to Cikini General Hospital, he was declared dead at 10:05 a.m. local time (UTC+7). He was buried at Karet Bivak Cemetery that evening, after ceremonies at the IKJ led by the author Sutan Takdir Alisjahbana and prayers at the Amir Hamzah Mosque in Ismail Marzuki Hall led by the poet Taufiq Ismail. Among the mourners were the former Minister of Information Boediardjo, the Minister of Education and Culture Fuad Hassan, and the Deputy Governor of Jakarta Anwar Umar.

Djajakusuma had never married, but left behind several nieces and nephews whom he had raised as his own children. After his death, newspapers throughout Jakarta carried obituaries by such cultural and film figures as Alisjahbana, the producer Misbach Yusa Biran, and the Perfini cameraman Soemardjono. These obituaries emphasised Djajakusuma's role in the development of the Indonesian film industry and the preservation of traditional culture. In a ceremony commemorating the fifth anniversary of Djajakusuma's death, all his documents and books were donated to the IKJ library.

== Style ==
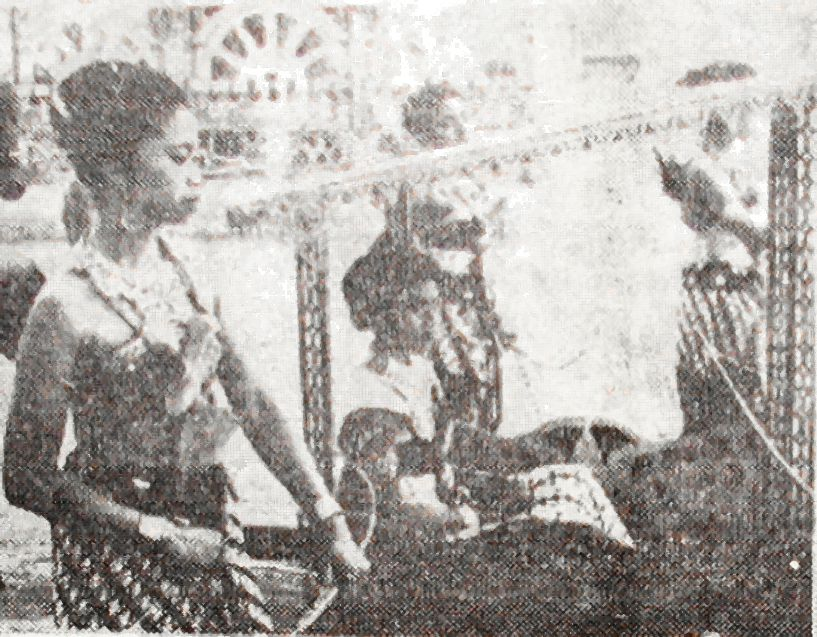
On the set of Djajakusuma's 1960 film Lahirnja Gatotkatja; the film was one of two he directed that was heavily influenced by wayang stories.

Like Usmar Ismail, Djajakusuma was influenced by realism. However, while Ismail preferred to focus on national-level themes, Djajakusuma was more drawn to simple, locally relevant storylines with educational messages. This realism carried over into Djajakusuma's work in wayang. The settings, traditionally drawn, were instead created as three-dimensional sets, including representations of trees, rocks, and water. According to Soemardjono, who often edited Djajakusuma's films, the director enjoyed experimenting with new techniques to better convey his intentions.

Djajakusuma often included traditional arts in his films, and two of them (Lahirnja Gatotkatja and Bimo Kroda) were based on traditional wayang stories and used wayang-inspired costumes and tempos. This focus on aspects of traditional culture fell out of the mainstream after 1965, having been replaced by films about city life. Djajakusuma's theatrical productions experimented with new storytelling techniques, adapting the traditional styles for the modern world. As a lecturer teaching screenwriting and the history of theatre, Djajakusuma focused on Indonesian arts. He argued that Indonesians should rely on local culture, not continuously look towards the West. In other areas he was mostly apolitical.

The Indonesian sociologist Umar Kayam, who had served on the Jakarta Art Council with Djajakusuma, described the director as highly disciplined. Biran described him as having a fiery temper which could be triggered suddenly, yet quick to calm when the trigger was removed; this sentiment was echoed by several people who had worked with Djajakusuma. Coverage in the film magazine Djaja described him as hardworking and highly dedicated to his craft, to the point of forsaking romantic relationships.

== Reception ==
Djajakusuma (left) shaking hands with Minister of Education Mashuri Saleh after receiving an award for his films

Djajakusuma's film Harimau Tjampa garnered him the Best Screenplay Award at the 1954 Asian Film Festival. His later film Bimo Kroda was recognised by the Indonesian Department of Information for promoting traditional culture. In 1970 he received an Art Award from the Indonesian government for "his service to the State as the Main Promoter of the Development of Modern Drama". (Note: Original: "Jasa terhadap Negara sebagai Pembina Utama Drama Modern".) At the 1987 Indonesian Film Festival, he received a special award for his contributions to the film industry, and in November 2003 he was posthumously granted a Budaya Parama Dharma Award by President Megawati Sukarnoputri for his contributions to the development of Indonesian culture. (Note: Other awardees included the comedian Bing Slamet and the actress Fifi Young (Unidjaja 2003, Megawati awards).)

Critical reception has been positive. The award-winning director Teguh Karya cited the works of Djajakusuma, Usmar Ismail, and Asrul Sani as "legendary" and among his greatest influences. Choreographer Bagong Kussudiardjo reportedly so respected Djajakusuma that he had named his son Djadoeg after the director. According to a memorial in the newspaper Kompas, Djajakusuma was also dubbed a "living legend" during his visit to Nantes. A later Kompas article records Djajakusuma's best-remembered works are Harimau Tjampa and Tjambuk Api. Those two works are those most often shown, as ready-to-use copies are stored at Sinematek Indonesia; his other surviving films are kept as negatives.

== Filmography ==
=== Cast ===
- Perempuan dalam Pasungan (Girl in Stocks; 1980) – as Mr. Prawiro

=== Crew ===
- Enam Djam di Jogja (Six Hours in Yogya; 1951) – as screenwriter
- Embun (Dewdrop; 1951) – as director and screenwriter
- Dosa Tak Berampun (Unforgivable Sin; 1951) – as screenwriter
- Terimalah Laguku (Take My Song; 1952) – as director
- Harimau Tjampa (Tiger from Tjampa; 1953) – as director and screenwriter
- Putri dari Medan (Girl From Medan; 1954) – director
- Mertua Sinting (Insane Parents-in-Law; 1954) – as director
- Arni (1955) – as director
- Tjambuk Api (Whips of Fire; 1958) – as director
- Pak Prawiro (Mr. Prawiro; 1958) – as director and screenwriter
- Pedjuang (Warriors for Freedom; 1960) – as production manager
- Mak Tjomblang (Mrs. Tjomblang; 1960) – as director and screenwriter
- Lahirnja Gatotkatja (Birth of Gatotkatja; 1960) – as director and screenwriter
- Masa Topan dan Badai (Time of Cyclones and Storms; 1963) – as director
- Rimba Bergema (Echoing Jungles; 1964) – as director
- Bimo Kroda (1967) – as director
- Malin Kundang (Anak Durhaka) (Malin Kundang [Faithless Child]; 1971) – as director
- Api Dibukit Menoreh (Gugurnya Tohpati) (Fire on Mount Menoreh [Death of Tohpati]; 1971) – as director
- Bang Kojak (Brother Kojak; 1977) – as producer

== Works cited ==
- Anwar, Rosihan (2004). Sejarah Kecil (Petite Histoire) Indonesia [Short History of Indonesia] (in Indonesian). Vol. 2. Jakarta: Kompas. ISBN 978-979-709-428-7.
- Ardan, S.M. (1 November 1987). "Djaduk Djajakusuma Bukan Cuma Pengabdi Seni" [Djaduk Djajakusuma Was Not Only into the Arts]. Suara Pembaruan (in Indonesian). p. 11.
- "Arni". Filmindonesia.or.id (in Indonesian). Konfidan Foundation. Archived from the original on 19 February 2014.
- Biran, Misbach Yusa, ed. (1979). Apa Siapa Orang Film Indonesia 1926–1978 [What and Who: Film Figures in Indonesia, 1926–1978]. Sinematek Indonesia. OCLC 6655859.
- Biran, Misbach Yusa (2009). Sejarah Film 1900–1950: Bikin Film di Jawa [History of Film 1900–1950: Making Films in Java] (in Indonesian). Jakarta: Komunitas Bamboo working with the Jakarta Art Council. ISBN 978-979-3731-58-2.
- "Budayawan D. Djajakusuma Sudah Tiada" [Cultural Figure D. Djajakusuma is Gone]. Kompas (in Indonesian). 29 October 1987. p. 1.
- "D.Djajakusuma Tutup Usia" [D.Djajakusuma Tutup Passes On]. Suara Karya (in Indonesian). 29 October 1987. pp. 1, 9.
- Darmawi, Suslanna (28 February 1982). "Djadoeg Djajakusuma". Suara Karya (in Indonesian). p. 1.
- Dharyono (7 November 1987). "Selamat Jalan Djadug Djajakoesoema: Sutradara dan Pencipta Wayang Orang Modern yang Pertama" [Farewell Djadug Djajakoesoema: Director and First Inventor of Modern Wayang]. Berita Buana (in Indonesian). p. 5.
- "Djaduk Djajakusuma". Encyclopedia of Jakarta (in Indonesian). Jakarta City Government. Archived from the original on 22 July 2012.
- "Djaduk Djajakusuma Mengenal Wayang & Teater Sejak Duduk di Sekolah Dasar" [Djaduk Djajakusuma Knew Wayang & Theatre Since Elementary School]. Berita Buana (in Indonesian). 13 November 1975. p. 4.
- "Djaduk Djajakusuma Pencetus "Wayang Gaya Baru"" [Djaduk Djajakusuma Trailblazer for "New-Style Wayang"]. Berita Buana (in Indonesian). 14 November 1975. p. 4.
- "Filmografi" [Filmography]. Filmindonesia.or.id (in Indonesian). Konfidan Foundation. Archived from the original on 16 April 2014.
- Hoerip, Satyagraha (1995). Dua Dunia dalam Djadoeg Djajakoesoema [Two Worlds in Djadoeg Djajakoesoema] (in Indonesian). Jakarta: Jakartan Ministry of Culture working with the Jakarta Institute of Art. ISBN 978-979-8699-00-9.
- Imanjaya, Ekky (2006). A to Z about Indonesian Film (in Indonesian). Bandung: Mizan. ISBN 978-979-752-367-1.
- Iskandar, Eddy D. (17 July 1983). "Sebagian Besar Hidupnya Untuk Seni" [Most of His Life for Art]. Suara Karya Minggu (in Indonesian). pp. 1, 11.
- Kadarjono, BZ. (1970). "Profil Seorang Seniman: D. Djajakusuma" [Profile of an Artist: D. Djajakusuma]. Djaja (in Indonesian) (452): 25.
- Loven, Klarijn (2008). Watching Si Doel: Television, Language, and Culture Identity in Contemporary Indonesia. Leiden: KITLV Press. ISBN 978-90-6718-279-9.
- "Mak Tjomblang". Filmindonesia.or.id (in Indonesian). Konfidan Foundation. Archived from the original on 19 February 2014.
- Marselli (6 November 1987). "Mengenang D. Djajakusuma dalam Perfilman Indonesia" [Remembering D. Djajakusuma in Indonesian Cinema]. Kompas (in Indonesian). p. 6.
- "Masa Topan dan Badai". Filmindonesia.or.id (in Indonesian). Konfidan Foundation. Archived from the original on 19 February 2014.
- "Mertua Sinting". Filmindonesia.or.id (in Indonesian). Konfidan Foundation. Archived from the original on 19 February 2014.
- "Pak Prawiro". Filmindonesia.or.id (in Indonesian). Konfidan Foundation. Archived from the original on 19 February 2014.
- "Pandangan Tokoh: Putu Wijaya" [Views: Putu Wijaya]. Tokoh Perfilman Indonesia (in Indonesian). National Library of Indonesia. Archived from the original on 30 September 2015.
- "Pandangan Tokoh: Taufiq Ismail" [Views: Taufiq Ismail]. Tokoh Perfilman Indonesia (in Indonesian). National Library of Indonesia. Archived from the original on 13 March 2016.
- "Pandangan Tokoh: Teguh Karya" [Views: Teguh Karya]. Tokoh Perfilman Indonesia (in Indonesian). National Library of Indonesia. Archived from the original on 30 September 2015.
- Panembahan, Harianto Gede (6 September 1987). "Barangkali, 40 pCt Manusia di Dunia Hasil Keisengan" [Perhaps 40 Per cent of People Are the Result of a Fling]. Sinar Pagi (in Indonesian). p. 4.
- "Pekan Film Djajakusuma: Mengenang "Legenda Hidup" Perfilman Indonesia" [Djajakusuma Film Week: Remembering Indonesian Cinema's "Living Legend"]. Kompas (in Indonesian). 22 January 1993. p. 16.
- "Perempuan dalam Pasungan". Filmindonesia.or.id (in Indonesian). Konfidan Foundation. Archived from the original on 21 February 2014.
- "Putri dari Medan". Filmindonesia.or.id (in Indonesian). Konfidan Foundation. Archived from the original on 16 April 2014.
- "Rimba Bergema". Filmindonesia.or.id (in Indonesian). Konfidan Foundation. Archived from the original on 19 February 2014.
- Said, Salim (1982). Profil Dunia Film Indonesia [Profile of Indonesian Cinema] (in Indonesian). Jakarta: Grafiti Pers. OCLC 9507803.
- Sen, Krishna; Hill, David T. (2000). Media, Culture and Politics in Indonesia. Melbourne: Oxford University Press. ISBN 978-0-19-553703-1.
- Setiawan, Iwan (1 March 2009). "National Film Month: Time warp, anyone?". The Jakarta Post. Archived from the original on 16 April 2014.
- Unidjaja, Fabiola Desy (8 November 2003). "Megawati awards posthumously Hero title to Gorontalo figure". The Jakarta Post. Archived from the original on 16 April 2014.
- "(Untitled)". Nasional (in Indonesian). 26 September 1960. p. 3.
