= Anak Perawan di Sarang Penjamun =

1962 film

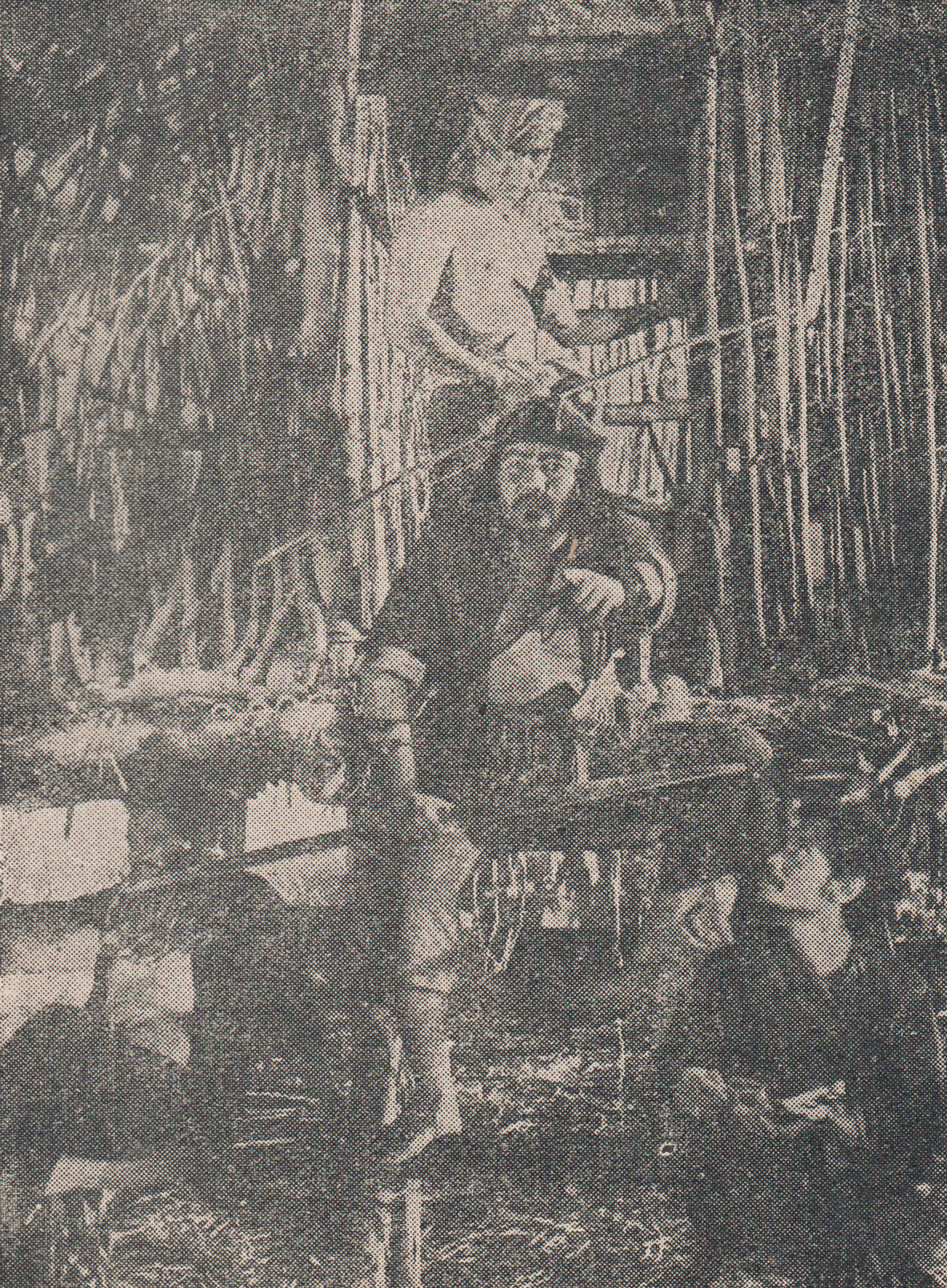
- The film's titular bandits
- Directed by: Usmar Ismail
- Screenplay by: Usmar Ismail
- Based on: Anak Perawan Disarang Penjamun by Sutan Takdir Alisjahbana
- Produced by: Usmar Ismail
- Starring: Bambang Hermanto; Nurbani Yusuf
- Cinematography: Max Tera
- Edited by: Soemardjono
- Music by: Jack Lesmana
- Production company: PERFINI
- Release date: 1962
- Running time: 127 minutes
- Country: Indonesia
- Language: Indonesian

Anak Perawan di Sarang Penjamun (Perfected Spelling: Anak Perawan di Sarang Penyamun; literally The Virgin in the Robbers' Nest) is a 1962 Indonesian film directed and produced by Usmar Ismail for PERFINI. Starring Bambang Hermanto and Nurbani Yusuf, it follows a young woman who is kidnapped by a group of bandits, only to fall in love with their leader. The film, adapted from the 1940 novel of the same name by Sutan Takdir Alisjahbana, was repeatedly blacklisted by the Indonesian government and only saw release several years after production ended.

== Plot ==
Medasing (Bambang Hermanto) is the fierce leader of a group of robbers who joined them after his parents were killed. He and his gang track the movements of a rich merchant (Rd Ismail) and his family, who are returning from a successful business trip. While the family is sleeping in the woods, Medasing and his men sneak into the camp, where they kill most of the porters and merchant. Leaving the merchant's wife behind, Medasing takes the merchant's daughter Sayu (Nurbani Yusuf) with him. He brings her to their hideout, where she is held captive.

Sayu discovers that, despite his fierce exterior, Medasing has a kind heart. He does not allow any of the gang to treat her improperly, and she is essentially free to act as she pleases. Over the months, Sayu and her kind heart are able to stir Medasing and prompt him to change his ways. After the members of his gang are killed in various mishaps, Medasing is gravely injured. Sayu tends to his wounds, and in return he brings her back to her village. They are married, and Medasing slowly rejoins society.

== Production ==
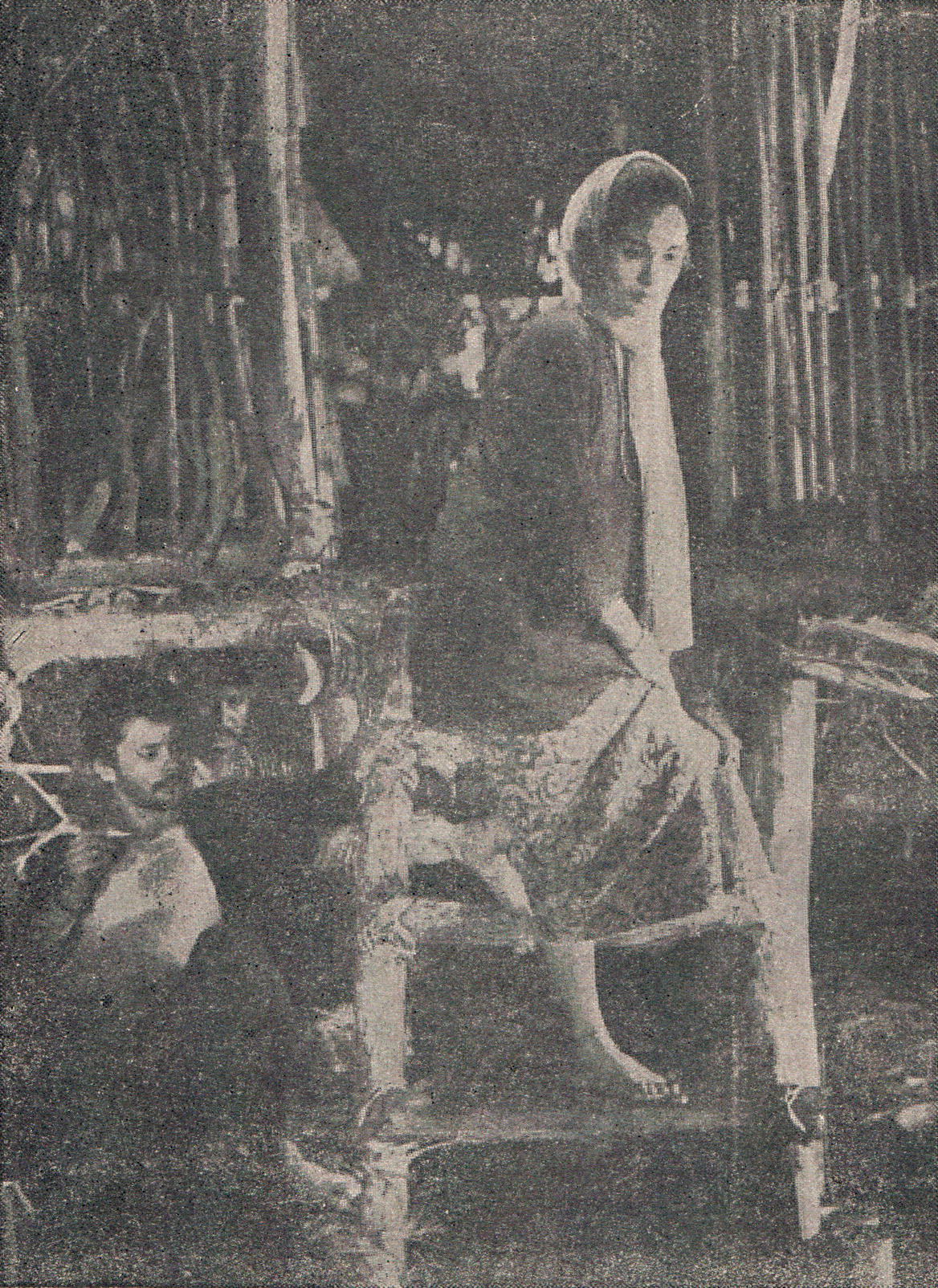
Sayu descending the steps at the bandits' hideout

The film was directed and produced by Usmar Ismail for his production company PERFINI. It saw Max Tera collaborating with Kasdullah and Kosnen on camera, with the film shot in black-and-white. Ardi Ahmad served as artistic director. In post-production Jack Lesmana handled music while Kemal Redha and E Sambas did sound. The film was edited by three persons: Soemardjono, Janis Badar, and SK Syamsuri. Its cast included Bambang Hermanto, Nurbani Yusuf in the starring roles, as well as Bambang Irawan, Rachmat Hidayat, and Rd Ismail.

Ismail adapted Anak Perawan di Sarang Penjamun from the novel of the same name by Sutan Takdir Alisjahbana. Initially printed as a serial, the novel had been published in 1940 by Pustaka Rakyat. Ismail advertised it as the first film adaptation of an Indonesian novel. However, several adaptations had been released previously, including an adaptation of Marah Roesli's Sitti Nurbaya by Lie Tek Swie in 1941.

== Release and reception ==
Anak Perawan di Sarang Penjamun was produced beginning in 1962. At the time tensions between leftist and rightist movements, both in politics and the arts, were reaching a high. The Communist Party of Indonesia-allied arts group Lekra would call for the Sukarno government to block films by non-Lekra filmmakers as anti-revolutionary. After a press screening on 26 February 1964, Anak Perawan di Sarang Penjamun was challenged by Lekra; a review in Warta Bhakti considered the film to "betrayal the [Indonesian people's] struggle", (Note: Original: "... mengchianati perdjuangan bangsanja.") owing to the film's pro-Malay sentiment during the ongoing confrontation with Malaysia. However, the Indonesian film historian Salim Said suggests that the film was condemned not because of its plot, but because of Alsijahbana's alliance to the Socialist Party of Indonesia.

In response to this challenge, Ismail removed Alisjahbana's name from the film's credits. This move was unable to placate Lekra, and it was eventually banned from release. After the 30 September Movement and the ensuing anti-communist purge, the Communist Party and most leftists were destroyed. Anak Perawan di Sarang Penjamun, however, remained blacklisted because of Hermanto's previous membership in the Communist Party. A VHS edition was ultimately released in the 1990s.

A 35 mm copy is stored at Sinematek Indonesia in Jakarta.

== Works cited ==
- "Anak Perawan di Sarang Penjamun". filmindonesia.or.id (in Indonesian). Jakarta: Konfiden Foundation. Archived from the original on 4 March 2014.
- Anak Perawan di Sarang Penjamun. OCLC 52067683.
- Anwar, Rosihan (April 1962). "Kerjasama Sastrawan dan Sinemawan Dirintis: "Anak Perawan di Sarang Penyamun"" [Pioneering Collaboration between Writers and Filmmakers: "Anak Perawan di Sarang Penyamun"]. Madjalah Purnama (in Indonesian). 1 (17). Jakarta: 3. Archived from the original on 27 November 2012.
- "Kredit Anak Perawan di Sarang Penjamun" [Credits for Anak Perawan di Sarang Penjamun]. filmindonesia.or.id (in Indonesian). Jakarta: Konfiden Foundation. Archived from the original on 17 December 2015.
- Mahayana, Maman S.; Sofyan, Oyon; Dian, Achmad (2007). Ringkasan dan Ulasan Novel Indonesia Modern [Summaries and Commentary on Modern Indonesian Novels] (in Indonesian). Jakarta: Grasindo. ISBN 978-979-025-006-2.
- Said, Salim (1982). Profil Dunia Film Indonesia [Profile of Indonesian Cinema] (in Indonesian). Jakarta: Grafiti Pers. OCLC 9507803.
- "Siti Noerbaja". filmindonesia.or.id (in Indonesian). Jakarta: Konfidan Foundation. Archived from the original on 2 December 2013.
