= Gadis Desa =

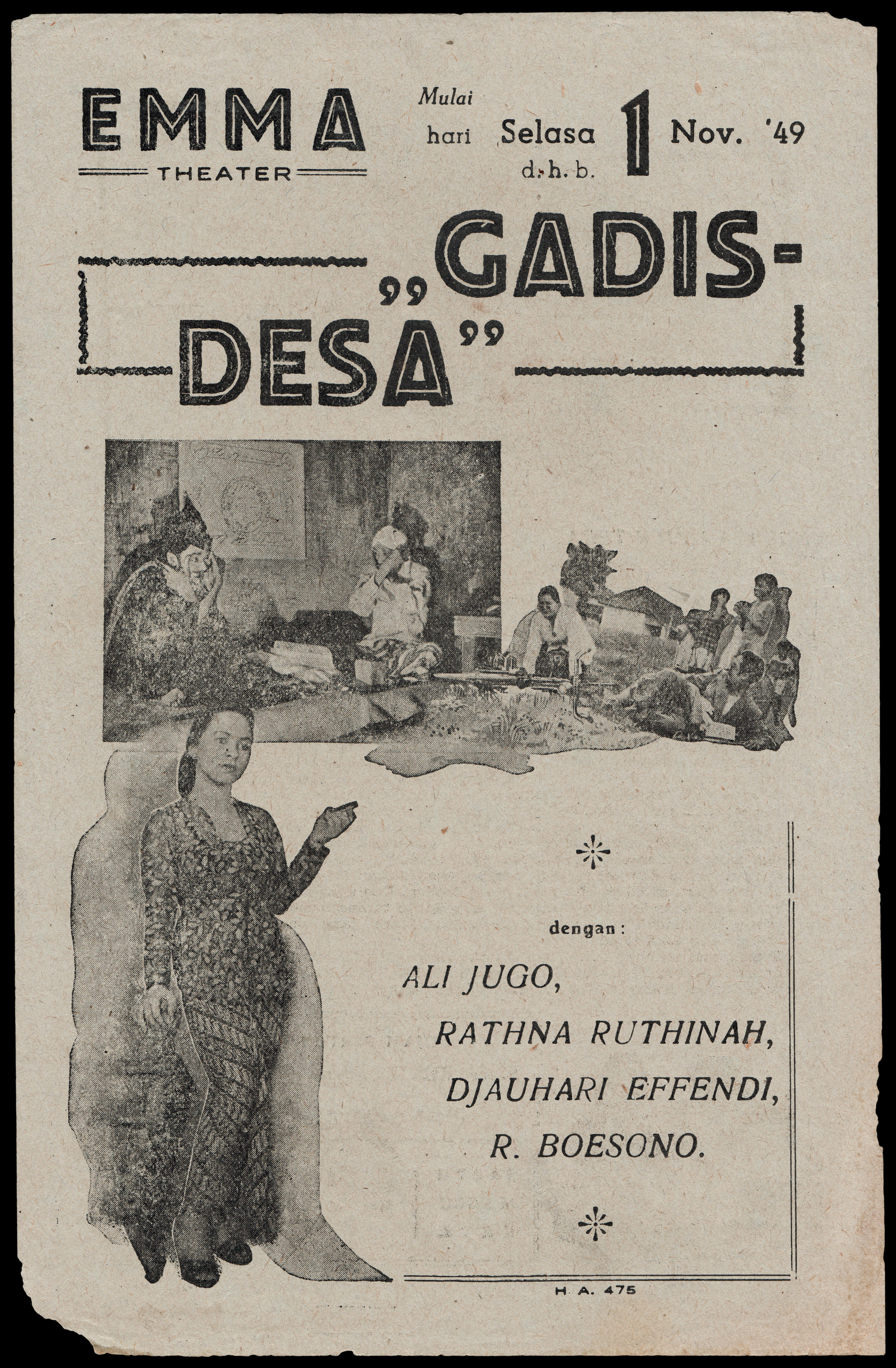
- Flyer, Malang
- Directed by: Andjar Asmara
- Written by: Andjar Asmara
- Starring: Basuki Djaelani; Ratna Ruthinah; Ali Joego; Djauhari Effendi
- Cinematography: AA Denninghoff-Stelling
- Production company: South Pacific Film Corp
- Release date: 1949 (Dutch East Indies)
- Countries: Indonesia; Dutch East Indies
- Language: Indonesian

Gadis Desa (literally Maiden from the Village) is a 1949 comedy from what is now Indonesia (Note: The film was released during the Indonesian National Revolution, in which time Indonesia had declared itself independent while the Dutch East Indies was still formally in existence.) written and directed by Andjar Asmara. Starring Basuki Djaelani, Ratna Ruthinah, Ali Joego, and Djauhari Effendi, it follows the romantic hijinks of a village girl who is taken to be a rich man's second wife. The film, produced by a Dutch-run company, is recognised as the first in which future "father of Indonesian film" Usmar Ismail was involved.

== Plot ==
Abu Bakar (Ali Joego) attempts to evict Amat after the latter falls behind on his rent, only to fall in love with Amat's beautiful daughter Aisah (Ratna Ruthinah). He says that she shall work as his maid, although he intends to make her his second wife. Rusli (Basuki Zaelani), Aisah's cousin and a manservant at Abu Bakar's home, discovers this plan and tells Abu Bakar's wife. Aisah is sent back to her village and Rusli, who has fallen in love with her, proposes.

== Production ==
Gadis Desa was produced by the South Pacific Film Corporation (SFPC), a film production house owned and run by the Netherlands Indies Civil Administration, a continuation of the former colonial government of the Dutch East Indies. The film was directed by the former journalist Andjar Asmara, who had worked for SPFC since 1948. The film was adapted from a stage play he had written for the travelling troupe Dardanella in the early 1930s. He brought Usmar Ismail, a young journalist with whom he had previously discussed filmmaking, to the production as an assistant director. The two native men had limited creative input, serving more as acting and dialogue coaches. The Dutch cameraman, AA Denninghoff-Stelling, held more power over the final product.

Gadis Desa starred Ali Joego, Ratna Ruthinah, Basuki Zaelani, and Djauhari Effendi. All had had theatrical experience: Joego had been a member of Dardanella with Andjar, Ruthinah and her husband Zaelani –making their feature film debut – had been members of the Matahari touring troupe, while Djauhari had been active in the theatre during the Japanese occupation beginning seven years earlier.

== Release and reception ==
Gadis Desa was released on 1 November 1949, followed by a novelisation in 1950. Although he does not record its box-office performance, the Indonesian film historian Misbach Yusa Biran suggests that the film's dated plot was reflective of a Dutch belief that native audiences would prefer unsophisticated comedy. A 35 mm copy is kept at Sinematek Indonesia.

The film proved Andjar's last as a director; he resigned from SPFC before its next production, Tjitra (1949), and spent the rest of his film career as a screenwriter. Ismail would go on to direct two films for SFPC, Tjitra and Harta Karun (1949), and, after the Netherlands recognised Indonesia's independence, he established himself as the "father of Indonesian film" with Darah dan Doa (1950). SPFC would produce four further films before being dissolved in 1949.

== Works cited ==
- "Abisin Abbas | Filmografi" [Abisin Abbas | Filmography]. filmindonesia.or.id (in Indonesian). Jakarta: Konfidan Foundation. Archived from the original on 16 April 2014.
- "Ali Yugo". filmindonesia.or.id (in Indonesian). Jakarta: Konfidan Foundation. Archived from the original on 8 August 2014.
- "Andjar Asmara". Encyclopedia of Jakarta (in Indonesian). Jakarta City Government. Archived from the original on 4 July 2012.
- Biran, Misbach Yusa (2009). Sejarah Film 1900–1950: Bikin Film di Jawa [History of Film 1900–1950: Making Films in Java] (in Indonesian). Jakarta: Komunitas Bamboo working with the Jakarta Art Council. ISBN 978-979-3731-58-2.
- "Djauhari Effendi". filmindonesia.or.id (in Indonesian). Jakarta: Konfidan Foundation. Archived from the original on 4 March 2016.
- "Gadis Desa". filmindonesia.or.id (in Indonesian). Jakarta: Konfiden Foundation. Archived from the original on 2 December 2013.
- "Gadis Desa | Kredit" [Gadis Desa | Credits]. filmindonesia.or.id (in Indonesian). Jakarta: Konfidan Foundation. Archived from the original on 20 October 2016.
- Imanjaya, Ekky (2006). A to Z about Indonesian Film (in Indonesian). Bandung: Mizan. ISBN 978-979-752-367-1.
- Kurniasari, Triwik (24 June 2012). "Reviving Usmar Ismail's legacy". The Jakarta Post. Archived from the original on 16 April 2014.
- "Ruth Threse Niesen". filmindonesia.or.id (in Indonesian). Jakarta: Konfidan Foundation. Archived from the original on 7 March 2016.
- Said, Salim (1982). Profil Dunia Film Indonesia [Profile of Indonesian Cinema] (in Indonesian). Jakarta: Grafiti Pers. OCLC 9507803.
- "South Pacific Film | Filmografi" [South Pacific Film | Filmography]. filmindonesia.or.id (in Indonesian). Jakarta: Konfidan Foundation. Archived from the original on 7 March 2016.
