= Tjambuk Api =

1958 film by D. Djajakusuma

- Newspaper advertisement
- Directed by: D. Djajakusuma
- Screenplay by: Titik Soerjo; Abu Bakar Dahlan
- Produced by: Usmar Ismail
- Starring: Bambang Irawan; Aminah Cendrakasih; Soekarno M. Noer; Rendra Karno
- Cinematography: Kasdullah; R Husein; Kosnen
- Edited by: Soemardjono
- Music by: Sjaiful Bachri
- Production company: Perfini
- Release date: 1958 (Indonesia)
- Running time: 127 minutes
- Country: Indonesia
- Language: Indonesian
- Budget: Rp 1.5 million

Tjambuk Api (literally Whips of Fire) is a 1958 Indonesian martial arts film directed by D. Djajakusuma and produced by Usmar Ismail. Starring Bambang Irawan, Aminah Cendrakasih, Soekarno M. Noer, and Rendra Karno, it tells of a young villager who must challenge a local criminal to be with his love. The film underwent several modifications over a period of more than a year before it could pass the censorship board, but now remains one of Djajakusuma's better known works.

== Plot ==
Kasan (Bambang Irawan) lost his father when he was young to an ill-fated whip duel. To avoid such a fate for him, his mother has him become a farmer. He uses his intelligence to create an irrigation system in their village in East Java, which provides them with plenty of rice. However, the village is terrorised by the whip-warrior and criminal Suro (Rendra Karno), who calls for tributes.

The situation becomes more difficult after Kasan falls in love with Suro's daughter, Marni (Aminah Cendrakasih). Although Marni also loves Kasan, Suro insists that she marry his right-hand man Karnen (Sukarno M. Noor) instead. Karnen uses his favoured position as an excuse to torture Kasan, which drives the latter to learn how to fight with a whip.

Marni escapes Karnen and hides at Kasan's homes; her refusal to return to Suro drives him to challenge Kasan to a duel. After a long struggle, Kasan emerges victorious and, after Marni asks him not to kill her father, he lets Suro go. The villagers are free to farm in peace, and Marni and Kasan become husband and wife.

== Production ==
The director of Tjambuk Api, D. Djajakusuma, spent a year studying film at the University of Washington in Seattle and the University of Southern California's School of Cinematic Arts in Los Angeles from 1956 to 1957; Tjambuk Api was his first film upon returning to Indonesia. The film was made by Perfini, under the leadership of Usmar Ismail; the latter served as producer. The story and scenario was written by Titik Soerjo and Abu Bakar Dahlan.

Tjambuk Api spent three years in production. The budget was reportedly 1.5 million rupiah. The film was reportedly held by the censorship bureau for almost a year causing it to miss the 1958 Asian Film Festival in Manila.

== Themes ==
Tjambuk Api has been read as a critique of the widespread corruption in Indonesia. Ismail wrote that the film was meant to show that Indonesian cinema was capable of producing more than government propaganda. William van der Heide, a lecturer on film studies at the University of Newcastle in Australia, writes that the film and its revenge story at times harks back to Hollywood Westerns, although with whips instead of guns.

== Reception ==
The film received screenings in 1961. An anonymous review in the Yogyakarta-based daily Nasional remarked that Djajakusuma had clearly meant to emphasise the dramatic elements of the story and noted that the audience seemed spellbound by the fighting scenes.

According to Kompas, Tjambuk Api and Djajakusuma's earlier work Harimau Tjampa (Tiger of Tjampa) are his best-known. The two are those most often shown, because ready-to-use copies are stored at Sinematek Indonesia. Van der Heide notes that the film's portrayal of a "headstrong and independent woman" precedes the first such depiction in the neighboring Malay country of Malaysia by 35 years.
