= Perfini =

Indonesian film production company

Logo

Perfini (Perusahaan Film Nasional Indonesia, Indonesia National Film Company) was an Indonesian film production company, based in Jakarta. It was most productive in Indonesian cinema in the 1950s. Its most notable directors were Usmar Ismail, who directed its first film Darah dan Doa (1950), and D. Djajakusuma. By 1966 it reportedly had its own studio, a "20-by-30-meter building large enough for construction of a couple of modest sets".

== Filmography ==
- Darah dan Doa (The Long March, 1950)
- Enam Djam di Jogja (Six Hours in Yogya, 1951)
- Embun ("Dewdrop", 1951)
- Dosa tak berampun (1951)
- Terimaiah laguku (1952)
- After the Curfew (1953)
- Krisis (1953)
- Kafedo (1953)
- Harimau Tjampa (Tiger from Tjampa, 1953)
- Tamu Agung (Exalted Guest, 1955)
- Arni (1955)
- Tiga Dara (1956)
- Tjambuk Api ("Whips of Fire", 1958)
- Pak Prawiro (1958)
- Mak Tjomblang (1960)
- Lahirnja Gatotkatja (1960)
- Masa Topan dan Badai (1963)
- Rima Bergema (1964)
