= Cassin Abbas =

Indonesian film actor and editor

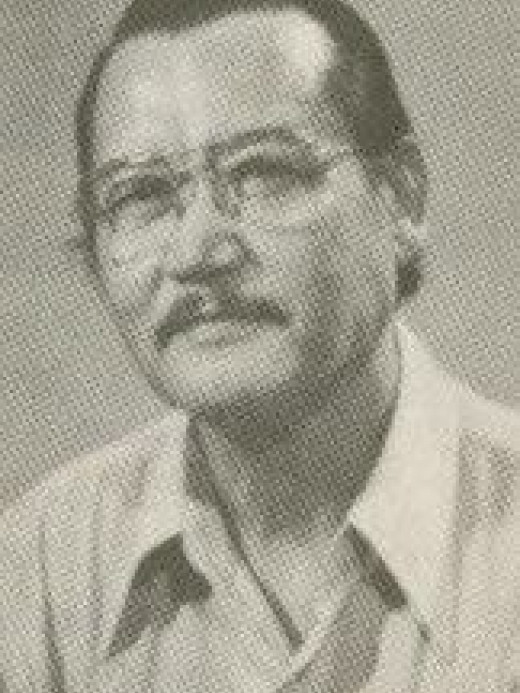
- Born: 28 March 1926; Semarang, Indonesia
- Died: 10 December 1982 (aged 56)
- Occupations: film actor and film editor

Cassin Abbas (28 March 1926 – 10 December 1982) was an Indonesian film actor and film editor. Born in Semarang, he became a Sergeant Major in the Indonesian army. He appeared in films such as Tamu Agung (1955), Five Deadly Angels (1980), and Bila hati perempuan menjerit (1981). Towards the end of his life he took to editing films.
