= Darah dan Doa =

1950 Indonesian war film by Usmar Ismail

- Magazine advertisement, Aneka (1 September 1950)
- Directed by: Usmar Ismail
- Written by: Usmar Ismail; Sitor Situmorang
- Produced by: Usmar Ismail
- Starring: Del Juzar; Ella Bergen; Aedy Moward; Awaluddin Djamin
- Cinematography: Max Tera
- Edited by: Djohan Sjafri
- Music by: G.R.W. Sinsu
- Production company: Perfini
- Distributed by: Spectra Film Exchange
- Release date: 1950
- Running time: 128 minutes
- Country: Indonesia
- Language: Indonesian
- Budget: IDR 350,000

Darah dan Doa ([daˈrah ˈdan doˈa]; Indonesian for Blood and Prayer, released internationally as The Long March) is a 1950 Indonesian war film directed and produced by Usmar Ismail, telling the story of the Siliwangi Division and its leader Captain Sudarto on a march to West Java. Following Ismail's Dutch-produced Tjitra (1949), Darah dan Doa is often cited as the first 'Indonesian' film, and the film's first day of shooting – 30 March – is celebrated in Indonesia as National Film Day.

Produced on a budget of 350,000 rupiah and intended to be screened at the Cannes Film Festival, financial difficulties led production of Darah dan Doa to almost stop before the director received financial backing. After raising controversy for its subject material, the film underwent censorship and was finally released to commercial failure. Retrospective analysis has, however, been more positive, and Ismail has been dubbed the "father of Indonesian film".

== Plot ==
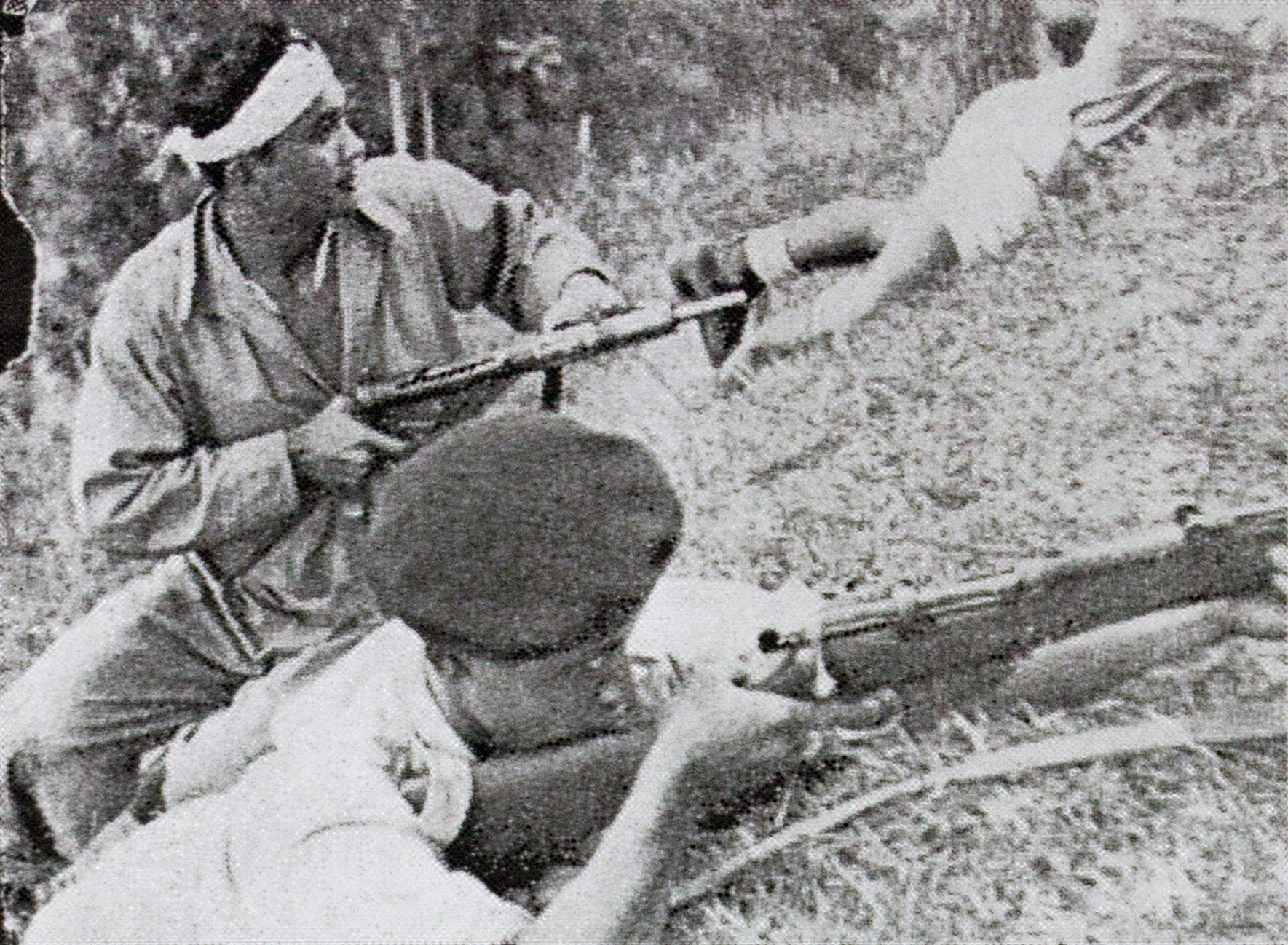
The Siliwangi Division in combat, in a scene from the film

The Siliwangi Division, originally headquartered in West Java, is temporarily based in Central Java owing to the Renville Agreement. After putting down a communist rebellion in Madiun, killing numerous members of the Communist Party of Indonesia in the process, they are on a break. The division's leader, Captain Sudarto, meets with an Indo woman named Connie, who is originally from Bandung. The two become fast friends, but after a Dutch attack is launched on the capital at Yogyakarta, they must separate as the division heads westwards. Captain Sudarto leads his men – together with women and children – over more than 200 kilometres (120 mi), resting during the day and traveling in the morning and evening. They face hunger, a shortage of supplies, and Dutch airstrikes. Along the way, Sudarto begins to fall in love with a nurse named Widya.

The division comes across a village that has been razed to the ground by Dutch forces, killing almost all of its inhabitants. Upon directions from the sole survivor, they go to a nearby village and are warmly received, being given much-needed food. As the men settle for the night, Sudarto goes for a walk with Widya, raising the men's ire. That night the men sleep comfortably in beds while the villagers stand guard. In the morning, however, the villagers – who are revealed to be related to the Darul Islam militant group – turn on them. The men successfully fought back, though Sudarto is shot by the village chief.

Sudarto orders the chief executed, a deed which ultimately falls on the man's son. Afterwards the division continues west. One night, Sudarto's second-in-command Adam tells him that the men are restless over his relationship with Widya. They argue, and Widya – who has overheard everything – says that she will go. The following morning Dutch soldiers launch an ambush in which many are killed, including Widya and Adam. The division in dire straits, Sudarto offers to go to nearby Bandung on his own for the much-needed supplies, leaving his fellow officer Leo in charge. After meeting with resistance fighters who offer supplies, Sudarto goes to visit Connie and is captured by Dutch forces.

While in prison Sudarto is tortured and begins to regret his actions, especially his womanising. After the Dutch recognise Indonesia's independence, Sudarto is released from prison, only to learn that his wife has left him and he is under investigation for poor leadership. After meeting with Leo, he realises that the division had reached safety. One night, as he reads his diary, Sudarto is accosted by a man whose relatives were killed in Madiun. After the two argue, Sudarto is shot dead.

== Production ==
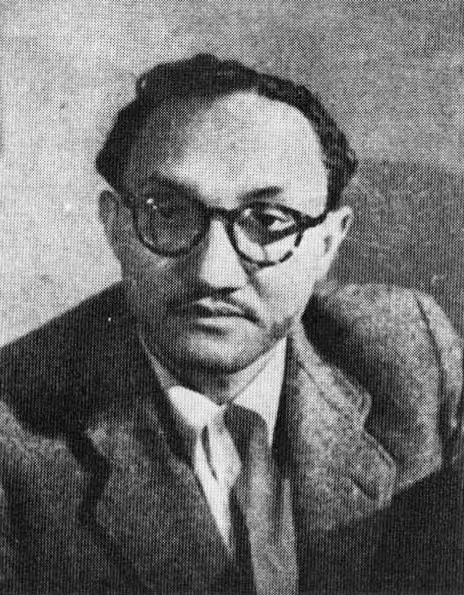
Usmar Ismail, the film's director and producer

Darah dan Doa was directed by Usmar Ismail, a former soldier who had previously served as assistant director on Andjar Asmara's Gadis Desa (Village Maiden) and directed two films on his own, Tjitra (Image) and Harta Karun (Treasure; all 1949). Creative control for these works, all of which were produced for the Dutch-sponsored South Pacific Film Corporation (SPFC), was held by cameraman A.A. Denninghoff-Stelling; Ismail served more as a dialogue coach. When the Netherlands recognised Indonesia's independence following several months of conferences in 1949, Ismail and other SPFC staff discussed establishing their own studio, though steps were not taken to do so until the following year. For his first production, Ismail chose to adapt a short story by the poet Sitor Situmorang, which the latter man had brought to him; Ismail later wrote that he considered it interesting because it "honestly told the story of a man without descending into cheap propaganda". (Note: Original: ... secara jujur kisah manusia dengan tidak jatuh menjadi film propaganda yang murah.")

Crew for the production consisted of cameraman Max Tera, a former SPFC employee, with makeup by Rancha', artistic design by Basuki Resobowo, G. R. W. Sinsu on music, and Sjawaludin and E. Sambas responsible for the sound effects. Ismail, using his military connections, received technical assistance from various members of the Indonesian Army, particularly Captain Sadono. The film's cast mostly consisted of newcomers who had responded to newspaper advertisements, a conscious decision by Ismail who was searching for "new faces with fresh talent" (Note: Original: "... muka-muka baru dengan bakat-bakat yang segar.") Ismail adapted this technique from Italian directors such as Roberto Rossellini and Vittorio De Sica. Ultimately Del Juzar, a University of Indonesia law student, was cast as Sudarto, with other spots going to Ella Bergen, Faridah, Aedy Moward, Awaluddin Djamin, Rd Ismail, Suzana, Muradi, and Rosihan Anwar.

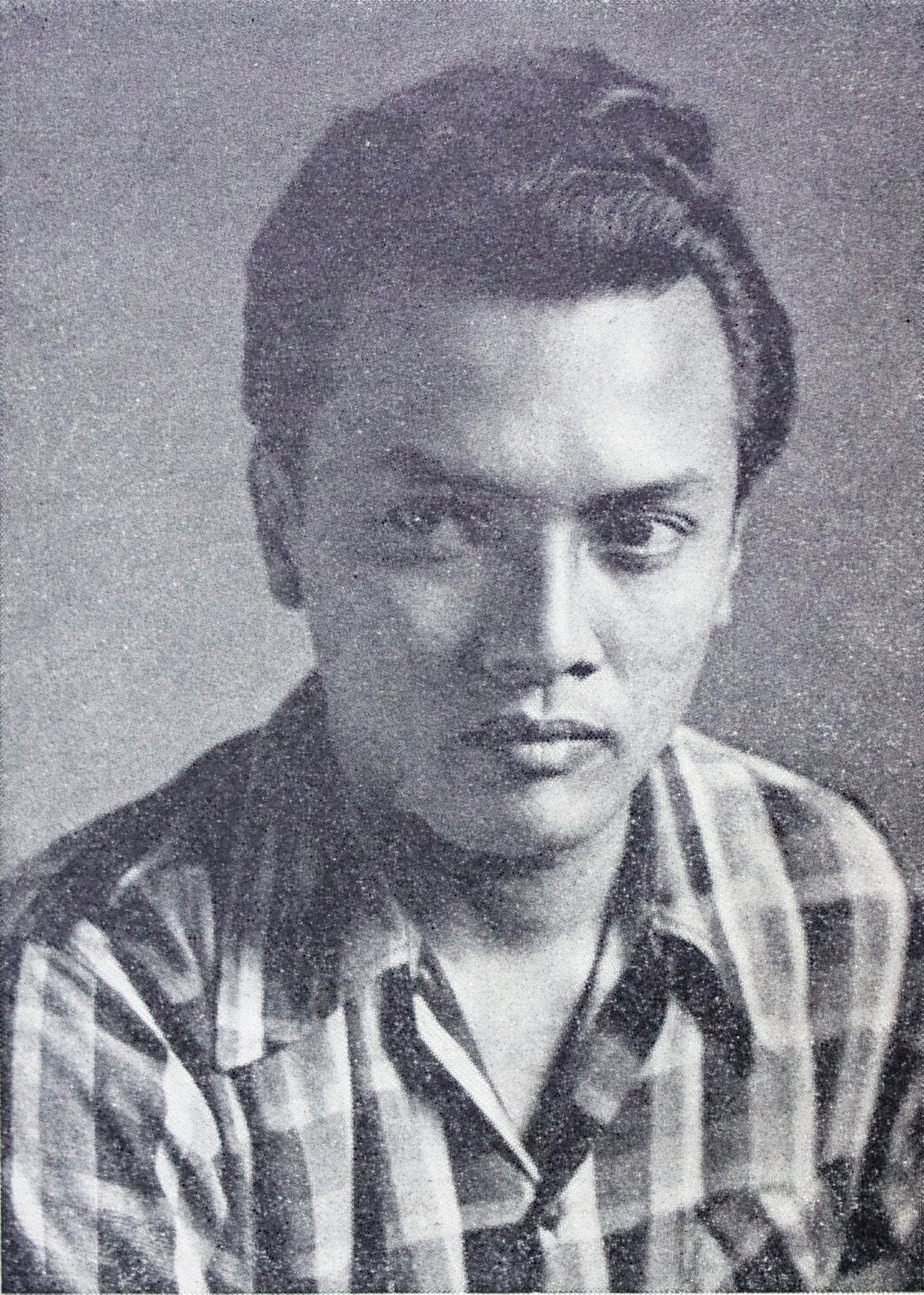
Del Juzar in 1953; he was cast in the lead role of Sudarto.

Twenty-nine years old, Ismail began shooting on 30 March 1950 in Subang, West Java. The following day he established his own studio, Perfini, to produce the film. Unlike his earlier films, Ismail had severe technical limitations. Though Tjitra had cost 67,500 rupiah, when the filming of Darah dan Doa began Ismail had only collected 30,000 – more than half of which was spent to rent the SPFC (since renamed Produksi Film Negara [State Film Company, or PFN]) studios and facilities. For their trip to Subang, the cast and crew rented a decrepit microbus; filming was completed using an aged ("decades-old") Akeley camera; and the crew had to hold more than one role.

Human factors also led to delays in production. Ismail and the other crew members attempted to achieve realism by ensuring everything in the film was as it was in life, a decision which he later recanted after realising that "film was truly the art of make-believe, making people believe something, creating a new reality from what is." (Note: Original: "... film itu adalah betul-betul seni make believe, membuat orang percaya tentang sesuatu, membuat kenyataan baru dari yang ada.") Cast-wise, three actors (including the lead, Del Juzar), competed for the affections of Faridah, leading to frictions between the actors. The cast also argued about interpretations of their roles, with Ismail insisting on them following his direction.

During filming, Ismail typed his shooting scripts every night, expanding on the source material. After each day of filming had concluded, Ismail sent the results back to PFN in Jakarta and obtained rush prints which he screened for the cast and crew. One such showing spurred a deal between Ismail and local cinema owner Tong Kim Mew, in attendance at the time: Tong would lend funds the production, heavily in debt (Ismail notes that, by this point, they had not paid their lodgings in "a while"), needed, while Ismail would allow Tong to handle distribution. This funding allowed the crew to finish shooting, including further scenes in Purwakarta. (Note: Tong also provided funding for Ismail's next two films, Enam Djam di Jogja (Six Hours in Jogja; 1951) and Dosa Tak Berampun (Unforgivable Sin; 1951), under similar terms (Biran 2009b, pp. 123–125).) Upon returning to Jakarta, Ismail and the crew found that some of the footage was unusable, as the "story did not work". (Note: Original: "... ceritanya tak jalan.") As such, additional footage was shot in West Javan mountains, including Mounts Lawu and Gede. Other scenes were filmed at the banks of Citarum River. Ultimately the film cost 350,000 rupiah (then approximately US$90,000), over three times that of an average contemporary production.

== Release ==
Darah dan Doa was released in September 1950 and distributed by Spectra Film Exchange. It was given the English title The Long March, which the American visual anthropologist Karl G. Heider suggests is a reference to the Chinese Long March of 1934. (Note: Ismail (1983, p. 185) notes that such was Sitor Situmorang's intention when writing.) Not long after the film's release, a two-pronged controversy grew around it, which resulted in the film being banned in parts of Indonesia. Members of other military divisions considered the film to put too much emphasis on Siliwangi's role, while members of the general public had difficulty believing that Darul Islam could have betrayed the national cause. Ultimately the film required President Sukarno's permission to be re-released in September 1950, after he received a private screening at the Presidential Palace in mid-1950. However, several scenes had to be cut.

Domestic critical reception of Darah dan Doa, which was advertised as showing "fierce fighting against the colonials!" (Note: Original: "Pertempuran sengit melawan pendjadjah") and "the joys and sorrows in guerrilla warfare", (Note: Original: "Suka Duka dalam GERILJA") was predominantly negative. A review in the newspaper Merdeka considered Darah dan Doa unsatisfying, with only a few acceptable scenes. Armijn Pane, writing four years after the film's release, criticised the troops' neatness during their march, writing that their uniforms should have become progressively dirtier. Foreign reception, however, has been more positive. The Japanese film critic Tadao Sato, for instance, praised the film's concept, comparing it to the work of Andrzej Wajda.

The Indonesian film critic Salim Said writes that Ismail intended to "not consider commercial aspects" (Note: Original: "... tidak akan mempertimbangkan segi komersial.") and send the film to the Cannes Film Festival in France. Ultimately Darah dan Doa was a financial failure, with losses that were not recouped until after Ismail released his next film the following year. The film was not screened at Cannes. In a 1960 retrospective, Perfini attributed the film's failure to a conflict of what the people wanted and what was provided; the write-up stated that Ismail had not meant to portray the military as it should be, but as it was – as well as individuals within it.

== Legacy ==
Ismail considered Darah dan Doa reflective of a "national personality", and, in a 1962 letter, he wrote that he considered it his first film because he had had little creative control in his 1949 productions. After directing the film he went on to make twenty-five more films as director, including two (Enam Djam di Jogja [Six Hours in Jogja; 1951] and Pedjuang [Warriors for Freedom; 1959]) dealing with the Indonesian National Revolution; competing companies also released films in a similar vein, (Note: These include productions by Persari (Sepandjang Malioboro [Along Malioboro, 1950]; Hampir Malam di Djogja [Almost Night in Jogja, 1951]), and Bintang Surabaja (Djembatan Merah [Red Bridge, 1950]; Selamat Berdjuang, Masku! [Fight Well, My Brother!, 1951]).) though Biran argues that they did not touch on the essence of the revolution. For his role as Darah dan Doa's director and his subsequent work, Ismail has been dubbed the "father of Indonesian film", though the film scholar Thomas Barker suggests that his role in the film industry's development was exaggerated by the New Order for their anti-communist, pro-nationalistic purposes.

Darah dan Doa is often considered the first "national" Indonesian film, although the first movie produced in the area, L. Heuveldorp's Loetoeng Kasaroeng, had been released 24 years prior. According to the Indonesian film historian Misbach Yusa Biran, the films released between 1926 and 1949 could not be called Indonesian films, for they lacked a sense of national identity. The film critic Nova Chairil stated likewise, considering the film the first to be "directed by a native Indonesian, produced by an Indonesian production house, and filmed in Indonesia". (Note: Original: "... disutradarai oleh orang Indonesia asli, diproduksi oleh perusahaan film Indonesia, dan diambil gambarnya di Indonesia.") Barker and fellow film scholar Charlotte Setijadi-Dunn, however, argue that films by ethnic Chinese producers – generally dismissed as profit oriented in mainstream studies – already contained an Indonesian identity, citing examples such as Njoo Cheong Seng's Kris Mataram (Keris of Mataram; 1940). They note that, unlike the homogeneous national identity offered in Darah dan Doa, these Chinese-produced films offered the possibility of a heterogeneous identity.

The Indonesian film community began celebrating the first day of Darah dan Doa's shooting, 30 March, as National Film Day in 1950. In a 1962 conference of the National Film Board of Indonesia, the date was given more formal recognition as National Film Day, and Darah dan Doa was recognised as the first "national film". National Film Day was formally established in 1999, when President B. J. Habibie passed Presidential Decree no. 25/1999. According to actor turned film director Slamet Rahardjo, the commemoration is so that "Indonesians acknowledge their local film industry and are willing to develop it".

The Siliwangi Division's long march was the subject of another film, Mereka Kembali (They Return) in 1972. Directed by Nawi Ismail, it starred Sandy Suwardi Hassan, Rahayu Effendi, Rina Hasyim, and Aedy Moward. Mereka Kembali won a single award, Runner-Up for Best Actor (Arman Effendy), at the 1972 Indonesian Film Festival. Heider, contrasting the two films, suggests that Darah dan Doa portrayed communists in a more sympathetic light and "ignored" Darul Islam, while Mereka Kembali did not depict the events in Madiun and demonised Darul Islam. He suggests that the earlier film was released in "a time for healing, a time to consolidate the new republic, to reincorporate even those who ... had fought against it." He further suggests that Darah dan Doa was more Europeanised and individualistic, with a focus of Sudarto, while Mereka Kembali emphasised the importance of the group and represented an "Indonesianization of the national cinema".

The Indonesian video archive Sinematek Indonesia holds both 35 mm and VHS copies of Darah dan Doa. It is also held at the Cinémathèque Française. The film continues to be screened at festivals.
