= Tiger from Tjampa =

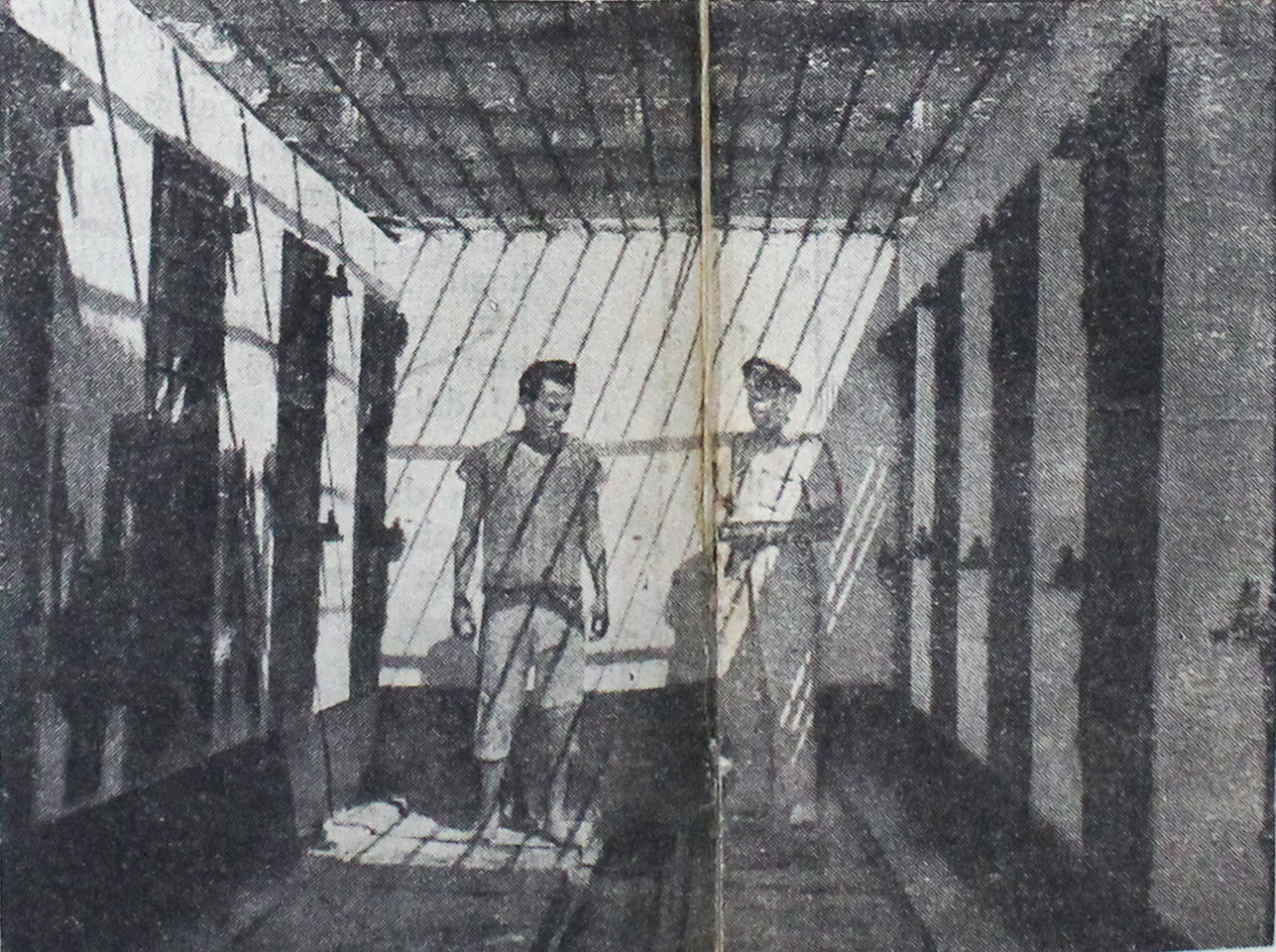
- Still picture of Harimau Tjampa.
- Directed by: D. Djajakusuma
- Written by: Alwi Dahlan
- Screenplay by: Alwi Dahlan
- Produced by: D. Djajakusuma
- Starring: Bambang Hermanto; Nurnaningsih; Titi Savitri; Wahid Chan; Raden Ismail; Malin Maradjo
- Cinematography: Max Tera
- Edited by: Sumardjono
- Music by: E. Sambas
- Distributed by: PERFINI
- Release date: 1953
- Running time: 97 minutes
- Country: Indonesia
- Language: Indonesian

Tiger from Tjampa (Indonesian: Harimau Tjampa) is an Indonesian black and white drama film released in 1953, produced by Perfini, written and directed by D. Djajakusuma. It is still highly regarded today in Indonesia as an early portrayal in a fiction film of aspects of a traditional regional culture. Despite the numerous combat scenes as well as scenes of students practicing pencak silat, Indonesia's traditional form of self-defence, based on the movements of animals and although in the film, the lessons are conducted by a famous master, Tiger from Tjampa was never presented as a martial arts film.

D. Djajakusuma won Best Scenario for this film at the first Indonesian Film Festival held in 1955.

== Plot ==
Set in the 1930s, and narrated like an old ballad, The Tiger from Tjampa tells the story of a young man, Lukman (Bambang Hermanto) who seeks to avenge his father's murder by learning pencak silat, Indonesia's traditional form of self-defence, based on the movements of animals. The pencak silat shown in the film is regionally specific to West Sumatra.

Lukman pleads Datuk Langit (Raden Ismail) to teach him, the man having asked him for three buffalos as payment which is beyond his means. Lukman then witnesses a man beat his opponent in a fight quite easily and begs him to teach him silat. The man agrees with the condition that his silat would not be used for oppressing the weak, but for self defense only. Lukman breaks his promise numerous times, but every time his teacher always manages to forgive him until his lessons are complete. Lukman then once defies his teacher by killing a gambler, and is imprisoned.

In jail, Lukman learns that Datuk Langit is responsible for his father's death. He manages to escape from prison and confront him, finally defeating him, after which he turns both him and himself to the authorities.

== Production ==
Filmed largely on location in 1953 in the villages in West Sumatra, the region of the matrilineal Minangkabau people, The Tiger from Tjampa is exceptional in its evocation of a unique region and milieu. Apart from some of the main actors, almost everything in the film is from West Sumatra. All the film's varied music is from there, as are its dances. In its dialogue the film also effectively uses peribahasa - maxims and proverbs handed down for generations within oral culture - with their characteristic lilting Minangkabau rhythms. The film also displays the intense spirit of community that underlies educational practises in an oral culture.

Djajakusuma, who took this project over from Usmar Ismail, is remembered in Indonesia as one of the first to make feature films in regional areas after independence. Both as a filmmaker, and as a teacher at the Jakarta Institute of the Arts, Djajakusuma's advocacy for a cinema engaging with the regions influenced younger generations of directors to follow his example, among those being Slamet Rahardjo and Garin Nugroho.

== Awards ==
D. Djajakusuma received the Best Scenario award at the Indonesian Film Festival in 1955.

== Controversy ==
Tiger from Tjampa raised controversy when the female lead, Nurnaningsih appeared half naked on-screen. This was a first in Indonesian cinema.
