= Tjitra =

1949 film by Usmar Ismail

- Directed by: Usmar Ismail
- Written by: Usmar Ismail
- Starring: Raden Sukarno; Nila Djuwita; Raden Ismail
- Cinematography: AA Denninghoff-Stelling
- Production company: South Pacific
- Release date: 1949 (Dutch East Indies)
- Running time: 71 minutes
- Country: Indonesia
- Language: Indonesian

Tjitra (literally Image) is a 1949 Indonesian film directed by Usmar Ismail for the Dutch-owned production house South Pacific. Starring Raden Sukarno, Nila Djuwita, and Raden Ismail, it follows a man named Harsono who takes a woman's virginity then flees to the city, where he is caught up in a murder case. Ismail's directorial debut, Tjitra was made while its director was still a member of the Indonesian Army. He later disavowed the film, as he felt he had had too little creative input.

== Plot ==
Harsono (Raden Sukarno) takes the virginity of Suryani (Nila Djuwita) on his family's plantation, then leaves her to live in the city. Whilst Suryani marries Harsono's brother Sutopo (Raden Ismail), Harsono finds himself attracted to a city girl, a flirt named Sandra. When she wrongs him, Harsono strangles her to death. During an ensuing investigation it is shown that Sandra died of a heart attack and not as a direct result of being strangled, allowing Harsono to return to his village. He tries to marry Suryani, but she chooses to stay with her husband.

== Production ==
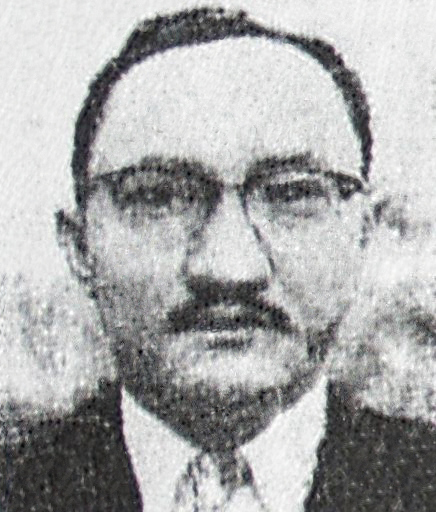
Director Usmar Ismail.

Tjitra was the first film directed by Usmar Ismail, originally a reporter. During the Japanese occupation of the Dutch East Indies from 1942 to 1945, Ismail had often discussed cinema with the film director Andjar Asmara, learning the basics. Around this time he wrote the screenplay for Tjitra. During the Indonesian National Revolution, he had joined the Indonesian Army and been arrested by the Dutch while covering the negotiations towards the Renville Agreement. Upon his release he was ordered to stay in the national capital at Jakarta and watch the Dutch movements. While doing so, he worked with the Dutch-owned South Pacific Film Corporation, first with Andjar and then on his own.

The film starred Raden Soekarno, Nila Djuwita, and Raden Ismail. It also featured A. Hamid Arief and Mohammad Said Hamid Junid. AA Denninghoff-Stelling, a Dutchman influenced by American cinema, was on camera. Tjitra was produced by South Pacific.

== Release ==
Tjitra was released in 1949, with a novelisation following in 1950; a song of the same name, by Cornel Simanjuntak, followed not long after. The introduction to the novel, entitled "Pengantar ke Dunia Film" ("Introduction to the World of Cinema"), was later compiled in the 1983 anthology Usmar Ismail Mengupas Film (Usmar Ismail on Film). A 35 mm copy of the film Tjitra is stored at Sinematek Indonesia's archives.

In a 1962 letter Ismail wrote that, aside from choosing the story, he had been given little control over the film. The producer dictated which shots were to be used and most of the creative aspects of filming. As such, Ismail disavowed Tjitra and Harta Karun, writing that he considered his first film to be Darah dan Doa (The Long March; 1950). The Indonesian film historian Misbach Yusa Biran wrote that, unlike most films from the Dutch East Indies, it showed a sense of an Indonesian nation.

== Works cited ==
- Biran, Misbach Yusa (2009). Sejarah Film 1900–1950: Bikin Film di Jawa [History of Film 1900–1950: Making Films in Java] (in Indonesian). Jakarta: Komunitas Bamboo working with the Jakarta Art Council. ISBN 978-979-3731-58-2.
- Imanjaya, Ekky (2006). A to Z about Indonesian Film (in Indonesian). Bandung: Mizan. ISBN 978-979-752-367-1.
- Said, Salim (1982). Profil Dunia Film Indonesia [Profile of Indonesian Cinema] (in Indonesian). Jakarta: Grafiti Pers. OCLC 9507803.
- "Tjitra". filmindonesia.or.id (in Indonesian). Jakarta: Konfidan Foundation. Archived from the original on 2 December 2013.
- "Tjitra | Kredit" [Tjitra | Credits]. filmindonesia.or.id (in Indonesian). Jakarta: Konfidan Foundation. Archived from the original on 6 March 2016.
