= Enam Djam di Jogja =

- Title card
- Directed by: Usmar Ismail
- Written by: Usmar Ismail
- Produced by: Usmar Ismail
- Starring: Del Juzar; Aedy Muward; Rd Ismail
- Cinematography: Max Tera
- Edited by: Djohan Sjafri; Max Tera
- Music by: G. R. W. Sinsu
- Production company: Perfini
- Release date: May 25, 1951
- Running time: 116 minutes
- Country: Indonesia
- Language: Indonesian

Enam Djam di Jogja (Perfected Spelling: Enam Jam di Yogya, literally Six Hours in Yogya) is a 1951 Indonesian film directed by Usmar Ismail. It was the second film to be produced under the PERFINI banner. Detailing the show of force in which the Indonesian republican army retook the capital at Yogyakarta for six hours, the film utilised much of the cast and crew from Ismail's previous work Darah dan Doa (1950). The film was a success in Indonesia and continued to be screened on the state television channel into the 1980s, even after two further films about the event were released.

== Plot ==
Amidst the Indonesian National Revolution, the Dutch colonial army has launched an assault on the Indonesian capital at Yogyakarta. After being overrun, the Indonesian Army withdraws, to continue the fight as guerrillas. In the city proper, the Indonesian populace suffers extensively.

In early 1949, the Sultan of Yogyakarta, Hamengkubuwono IX, orders a show of force: the guerrilla soldiers are to take back the city, hold it for six hours, and then withdraw. This attack, intended to show that the Dutch had not put down the Indonesian forces and thus embarrass the returning colonists in front of the United Nations, goes as planned on the morning of 1 March. The Netherlands recognises Indonesia's independence by the end of the year.

== Cast ==
- Rd Ismail
- Del Juzar
- Aedy Moward
- Agus Muljono
- M. Sani

== Production ==
Enam Djam di Jogja was directed and produced by Usmar Ismail. It was his second film dealing with the national revolution following Darah dan Doa (The Long March) the preceding year, which had followed the Siliwangi Division's long march to West Java. The black-and-white film Ismail also wrote the film's story, with Gajus Siagian handling the screenplay. In the film's opening credits, he wrote that it was intended to show the "tight cooperation between the people, army, and government" (Note: Original: "... perdjuangan rakjat, tentara, dan pemerintah, kerdja sama jang rapi...") without which the 1 March General Assault could not have happened and commemorate those who had fallen fighting for the nationalist cause.

Enam Djam di Jogja retained much of the same crew as Darah dan Doa, including cinematographer Max Tera, music arranger G.R.W. Sinsu, and editor Djohan Sjafri. Cast members who returned from the earlier film included Del Juzar, Aedy Moward, and Rd Ismail.

Filming was completed on location in Yogyakarta, at sites which had seen action during the assault. Ismail and his crew were aided in their filming by persons who had seen the events depicted. After funds were depleted, Ismail took a loan from a local cinema owner to ensure he could complete Enam Djam di Jogja.

== Release and reception ==
Enam Djam di Djogdja was released on May 25, 1951. Before Enam Djam di Jogja was released in early 1951, Ismail endured a lengthy censorship process. The Indonesian censorship bureau, according to the film critic Salim Said, took issue with the depiction of Dutch soldiers; in the end, numerous scenes showing them were cut. Critical reception at the time was mixed: a review in the magazine Aneka, for instance, found that the shots could have been better, but the performances were better than usual for domestic works.

The Indonesian film archive Sinematek Indonesia holds both a 35 mm and VHS copy of Enam Djam di Jogja. Allusions to the title, in other Indonesian works, were made as late as 1991.

Two further films have been released detailing the General Assault of 1 March: Abbas Wiranatakusuma's Janur Kuning (Yellow Coconut Leaves; 1980) and Arifin C. Noer's Serangan Fajar (Dawn Attack; 1982). Unlike Enam Djam di Jogja, these two films emphasised the role of future President Suharto – who is not present in Ismail's version. At the time these two films were released, Enam Djam di Jogja continued to be screened on the state television network TVRI. Eventually Janur Kuning was broadcast annually on the anniversary of the assault, before it and Serangan Fajar were withdrawn from broadcast in 1998 for attempting to manipulate history and create a cult with Suharto in the centre, following Suharto's downfall.

== Works cited ==
- Anwar, Rosihan (2004). Sejarah Kecil Petite Histoire Indonesia [A Small History (Petite Histoire) of Indonesia] (in Indonesian). Jakarta: Kompas. ISBN 978-979-709-428-7.
- Dharmawan, Bagus (2008). Warisan (daripada) Soeharto [Legacy (from) Soeharto] (in Indonesian). Jakarta: Kompas. ISBN 978-979-709-364-8.
- "Enam Djam di Djogdja". filmindonesia.or.id. Jakarta: Konfidan Foundation. Archived from the original on 3 April 2017.
- "Enam Djam di Djogdja | Kredit" [Enam Djam di Djogdja | Credits]. filmindonesia.or.id (in Indonesian). Jakarta: Konfidan Foundation. Archived from the original on 3 April 2017.
- Heider, Karl G. (1991). Heider: Indonesian Cinema Paper. University of Hawaii Press. ISBN 978-0-8248-1367-3.
- Ismail, Usmar (director and producer) (1951). Enam Djam di Djogdja (in Indonesian). Jakarta: Perfini. OCLC 51836001.
- "Long March, The (Darah dan Doa) | Kredit" [Long March, The (Darah dan Doa) | Credits]. filmindonesia.or.id (in Indonesian). Jakarta: Konfidan Foundation. Archived from the original on 7 March 2016.
- Mrázek, Jan (2005). Phenomenology of a Puppet Theatre: Contemplations on the Art of Javanese Wayang Kulit. Leiden: KITLV. ISBN 978-90-6718-252-2.
- Rini K; Evan (30 September 2012). "Tokoh di Balik Penghentian Pemutaran Film G30S" [Persons Behind the Ceasing of Screenings of the G30S Film]. Tempo (in Indonesian). Archived from the original on 5 September 2019.
- Said, Salim (1982). Profil Dunia Film Indonesia [Profile of Indonesian Cinema] (in Indonesian). Jakarta: Grafiti Pers. OCLC 9507803.
