= Warriors for Freedom =

1960 film

- Directed by: Usmar Ismail
- Starring: Soendjoto Adibroto
- Release date: 1960
- Running time: 152 minutes
- Country: Indonesia
- Language: Indonesian

Warriors for Freedom (Indonesian: Pedjuang) is a 1960 Indonesian drama film directed by Usmar Ismail. It was entered into the 2nd Moscow International Film Festival where Bambang Hermanto won the Silver Prize for Best Actor.

== Plot ==
Circa 1947, a platoon led by Letnan Amin (Rendra Karno) receives an assignment to hold a strategically important bridge. These troops are supported by a number of refugees, among them Irma (Chitra Dewi), a middle-class child cynical about the fight for independence. Amin and Irma are in a secret relationship; Sergeant Major Imron (Bambang Hermanto) also has an interest towards Irma. When Amin is injured, Imron is assigned to lead the troops away from Dutch-held territory, which is accomplished. Corporal Seno (Bambang Irawan) suspects Imron of wanting Amin out of the way to get Irma. In order to prove this suspicion wrong, Imron decides to undertake an operation to free Amin from a Dutch prison camp. Amin is freed, but Imron dies. After they are reunited Irma finally chooses to be with Amin.

== Cast ==
- Soendjoto Adibroto
- Ariati
- Farida Arriany
- Piet Burnama
- Chitra Dewi
- Hamidy T. Djamil
- Bambang Hermanto
- Bambang Irawan
- Rendra Karno
- Ismed M. Noor
- Lies Noor
- Mansjur Sjah
- Wolly Sutinah as Corporal Seno's mother
