= Usmar Ismail =

Indonesian film director (1921–1971)

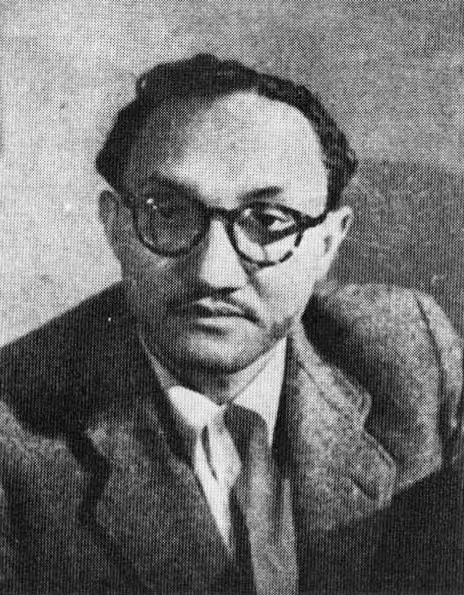
- Ismail, c. 1955
- Born: 20 March 1921; Fort De Kock, Dutch East Indies
- Died: 2 January 1971 (aged 49); Jakarta, Indonesia
- Occupations: Director, film producer, writer
- Years active: 1950–1970

Usmar Ismail (20 March 1921 – 2 January 1971) was an Indonesian film director, author, journalist and revolutionary of Minangkabau descent. He is widely regarded as the native Indonesian pioneer of Indonesian cinema.

== Biography ==
Ismail was born in 1921 in Bukittinggi, West Sumatra. His father, Datuk Tumenggung Ismail, taught at the medical school in Padang. His brother Abu Hanifah was also a well-known revolutionary and writer. Ismail attended ASM-A Yogyakarta and later obtained a B.A. in cinematography from the University of California, Los Angeles in 1952.

Ismail initially served in the army during the Dutch colonial rule. He served in the Indonesian army in Yogyakarta. During this time, he was a co-founder of a newspaper called Rakyat, meaning "people" or "populace" in Bahasa Indonesia. He worked as the head of the Indonesian Journalists Association in 1946 and 1947. In 1948, he was arrested while working at national news agency Antara for covering Dutch-Indonesian negotiations.

After his release, Ismail's interest in filmmaking developed more seriously. He became active in a number of film and theater groups, including the Yogyakarta Union of Playwrights, the Indonesian National Academy of Theater, and the National Film Industry Conference Body (Indonesian: Badan Musyawarah Perfilman Nasional). He is well-known as one of the founders of Indonesian National Film Corporation, together with Djamaluddin Malik and others involved in the film industry.

Ismail was also active in politics. He served as the chief of the Indonesian Association of Muslim Artists (Indonesian: Lembaga Seniman Muslimin Indonesia, or Lesbumi). He was also involved with Nahdatul Ulama and served in the People's Consultative Assembly from 1966 to 1969.

Following his dream of becoming a film director, he established "Perfini Studios", Indonesia's first film studios, in the early fifties. One of his early films, Darah dan Doa (English: Blood and Prayer), is considered the first truly Indonesian film.

Many of Ismail's films faced criticism from the government and censorship. His 1962 film Anak Perawan di Sarang Penyamun (English: The Virgen in the Robber's Nest) was boycotted by the Communist Party of Indonesia (Indonesian: Partai Komunis Indonesia, or PKI), as the film was judged take a position too supportive of Malaysia. It remained blacklisted by the New Order government after the 1965-66 Communist purges due to one of the leading actor's links to the PKI.

He was perhaps best known internationally for his 1961 film Fighters for Freedom, which documented Indonesian independence from the Dutch and French. The film was entered into the 2nd Moscow International Film Festival, making it the first Indonesian-directed film to appear in an international film festival.

A concert hall known as the Usmar Ismail Hall, which gives musical, opera and theatrical performances, was established in his name in Jakarta.

He died on 2 January 1971 of a stroke in Jakarta. He is buried in TPU Karet Bivak in Jakarta.

== Tributes ==
On 20 March 2018, Google celebrated his 97th birthday with a Google Doodle.

Usmar Ismail became one of four individuals awarded by President Joko Widodo as a National Hero of Indonesia in Indonesia's Heroes Day of 2021.

== Filmography ==
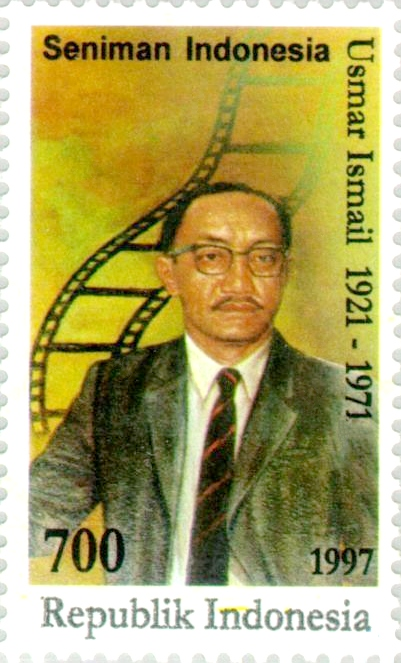
Usmar Ismail on a 1997 stamp

- Harta Karun (1949)
- Tjitra (1949)
- Darah dan Doa (1950)
- Enam Djam di Djogdja (1951)
- Dosa Tak Berampun (1951)
- Kafedo (1953)
- Krisis (1953)
- Lewat Djam Malam (1954)
- Lagi-Lagi Krisis (1955)
- Tamu Agung (1955)
- Tiga Dara (1956)
- Sengketa (1957)
- Delapan Pendjuru Angin (1957)
- Asrama Dara (1958)
- Pedjuang (1960)
- Laruik Sandjo (1960)
- Toha, Pahlawan Bandung Selatan (1961)
- Korban Fitnah (1961)
- Amor dan Humor (1961)
- Anak Perawan di Sarang Penjamun (1962)
- Bajangan di Waktu Fadjar (1962)
- Masa Topan dan Badai (1963)
- Anak-Anak Revolusi (1964)
- Liburan Seniman (1965)
- Ja Mualim (1968)
- Big Village (1969)
- Bali (1970)
- Ananda (1970)
