= Sundel bolong =

Mythological creatures

Creature information
- Grouping: Legendary creature
- Sub grouping: Vengeful ghost, nocturnal, undead
- Similar entities: Tai Thang Klom
- Folklore: Indonesian

Origin
- Country: Indonesia
- Region: Southeast Asia
- Habitat: Haunted house, graveyard, area where death took place

In Indonesian mythology, a sundel bolong is a mythical ghost from the archipelago which is a woman with beautiful long, black hair and a long white dress (her form is similar to Pontianak). The myth is closely linked to prostitutes, meaning a "prostitute with a hole in her", in reference to the large hole which is said to appear in her back.

== Etymology ==
The name "sundel bolong" derives from the physical appearance of the ghost. The word "sundel" means "prostitute" or "whore" and "bolong" in Javanese which literally means "hole". Modern folklore studies believe that the myth was developed in Javan culture to deter prostitution that developed during the Dutch East Indies colonization.

== Mythology ==
In folklore, a sundel bolong, more commonly referred to as a prostitute ghost is the soul of a woman who died when she was pregnant outside of marriage and therefore gave birth in her grave, or who died during childbirth and the baby came out from her back (this is the reason why the hole was created in her back) which is concealed from men by her long black hair.

The victims of sundel bolong supposedly consist mainly of men and children. As a vengeful spirit, if rejected by a man, she is said to castrate him. Children, especially newborns are said to be taken to replace her lost child.

Sundel bolong has appeared in a number of movies. In 1981, an adult horror film, Sundelbolong was released, directed by Sisworo Gautama Putra and in 2007, Legenda Sundel Bolong was released, as well as a 2018 remake, Suzzanna: Bernapas dalam Kubur.

== Popular culture ==
- In Marvel Anime: Blade, the sundel bolong are depicted as an Asian vampire sub-species.
- In the horror game DreadOut developed by Digital Happiness, sundel bolong is featured as one of the ghosts.

== See also ==
- Bloody Mary (folklore)
- Keres (Κῆρες), spirits of violent or cruel death in Greek mythology
- Madam Koi Koi
- Onryō
- Phi Tai Hong
- White Lady
