= Indriati Iskak =

Indonesian actress (born 1942)

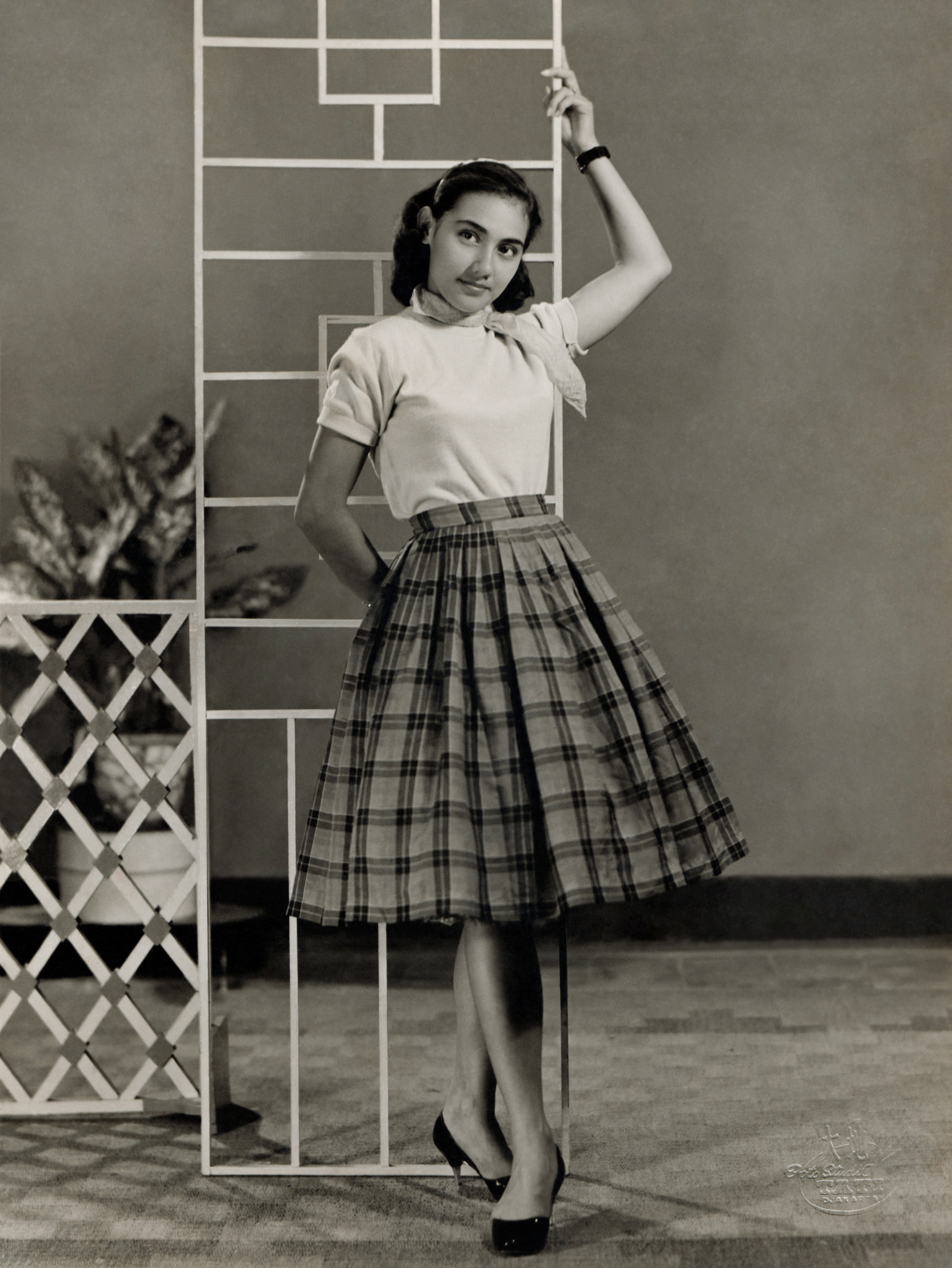
- Indriati in c. 1960
- Born: Indriati Gerald Bernardina; 9 June 1942 (age 84); Surabaya, Japanese-occupied East Indies
- Occupations: Actress; writer; psychologist; marketer
- Spouse: Makki Perdanakusuma (m. 1962; died 2014)
- Children: 3
- Relatives: Halim Perdanakusuma (brother in-law); Nadiem Makarim (grandson-in-law)

Indriati Gerald Bernardina (born 9 June 1942), also known by her stage name Indriati Iskak and after marriage as Indri Makki, is an Indonesian actress turned psychologist and marketer. She entered the Indonesian film industry and soared to popularity with Usmar Ismail's commercially successful Tiga Dara (1957). She appeared in eight further films and established her own girl group before retiring from cinema in 1963. She graduated from the University of Indonesia with a degree in psychology in 1968, and has taught the subject at the Jakarta Institute of Arts. For twenty-six years she worked with Unilever, and since 1994 she has been a marketing consultant with Makki Makki. Since 2022, she is the only surviving cast of Tiga Dara

== Life and career ==
Indriati Iskak was born Indriati Gerald Bernardina on 9 June 1942, at Santa Melania Hospital, in Tambaksari, Surabaya. She is the daughter of Robert Maria "Bob" Iskak, an educator who transitioned to film in 1952, when he became the director of Penjelendup (Smuggler).

Indriati made her feature film debut in Usmar Ismail's Tiga Dara (Three Maidens, 1956), starring alongside Chitra Dewi and Mieke Wijaya. She portrayed Nenny, the youngest of three sisters raised by their grandmother after their mother's death. The film was a massive popular success, and Indriati, who was praised for having a more naturalistic acting style than her stage-trained fellow actors, achieved the greatest popularity among her co-stars.

The following year, Indriati appeared in another of Ismail's films, Sengketa (Conflict, 1957). She again played the daughter in a family fraught with difficulties. After this film, Indriati completed two productions with Djuprihadi's Stupa Film, both under the direction of Wim Umboh: Djuara Sepatu Roda (Roller Skating Champion, 1958) and Tiga Mawar (Three Roses, 1959). With Rima Melati, Gaby Mambo, and Baby Huwae, she formed a girl group named the Baby Dolls in 1959.

Indriati continued acting through 1963, when she made her last film, Daun Emas (Golden Leaves). It was directed by her father and co-starred her brother Boy. Indriati's popularity during the 1950s and 1960s has been credited with leading Indonesian film directors to seek out Indo-looking actresses for their films, and thus precipitating the careers of film stars such as Lydia Kandou, Meriam Bellina, and Tamara Bleszynski. Advertising for Perfini's Asrama Dara (Dormitory for Girls; 1958) touted its young star Suzzanna, an Indo girl from Bogor, as the next Indriati Iskak.

After Daun Emas, Indriati retired from acting and went to university, completing a degree in psychology at the University of Indonesia in 1968. After some time working at the Indonesian Air Force's psychological counselling bureau, in the 1970s she began working at Unilever. She stayed with the company for twenty-six years, at first handling market research before moving on to marketing management and advertising. Towards the end of her time with Unilever, she oversaw the computerisation of the company's Indonesia branch. In the mid-1970s, Indriati also taught psychology at the Jakarta Art Institute, and for fifteen years she was on the board of the Strada system of Catholic schools.

Indriati married an Indonesian Air Force officer, Makki Perdanakusuma, who was the younger brother of Halim Perdanakusuma, on 15 May 1962. They remained married until Perdanakusuma's death in July 2014. As of 2016, Indriati is a branding consultant with Makki Makki, having worked there since 1994. Her daughter Sania and son Sakti also work for the company.

== Filmography ==
During her six-year film career, Indriati appeared in nine films.

- Tiga Dara (1956)
- Sengketa (1957)
- Djuara Sepatu Roda (1958)
- Tiga Mawar (1959)
- Desa yang Dilupakan (1960)
- Gadis Diseberang Djalan (1960)
- Djantung Hati (1961)
- Masih Ada Hari Esok (1961)
- Daun Emas (1963)

== Works cited ==
- Apa Siapa Orang Film Indonesia [What and Who: Film Figures in Indonesia] (in Indonesian). Jakarta: Indonesian Ministry of Information. 1999. OCLC 44427179.
- Anwar, Rosihan (1991). Peringatan 20 Tahun Wafatnya H. Usmar Ismail Bapak Perfilman Indonesia (1971–1991) [In Memorial: 20 Years (1971–1991) After the Death of the Father of Indonesian Cinema, H. Usmar Ismail] (booklet) (in Indonesian). Committee for the Indonesian Film Festival.
- Biran, Misbach Yusa, ed. (1979). Apa Siapa Orang Film Indonesia 1926–1978 [What and Who: Film Figures in Indonesia, 1926–1978]. Jakarta: Sinematek Indonesia. OCLC 6655859.
- Biran, Misbach Yusa (2009). Peran Pemuda dalam Kebangkitan Film Indonesia [The Role of the Youth in the Development of the Indonesian Film Industry] (in Indonesian). Jakarta: Ministry of Youth and Sports. OCLC 607257806.
- "Indriati Iskak – Filmografi" [Indriati Iskak – Filmography]. filmindonesia.or.id (in Indonesian). Jakarta: Konfiden Foundation. Archived from the original on 24 September 2016.
- Imanjaya, Ekky (2006). A to Z about Indonesian Film (in Indonesian). Bandung: Mizan. ISBN 978-979-752-367-1.
- "Indri Says Hi!". Makki Makki. Archived from the original on 28 August 2016.
- Kristanto, JB, ed. (2007). Katalog Film Indonesia 1926 – 2007. Jakarta: Nalar. ISBN 978-979-26-9006-4.
- Prabowo, Dani (27 July 2014). "Makki Perdanakusuma Meninggal Dunia" [Makki Perdanakusuma Dies]. Kompas (in Indonesian). Archived from the original on 13 August 2016.
