= Chitra Dewi =

Indonesian actress and director (1930–2008)

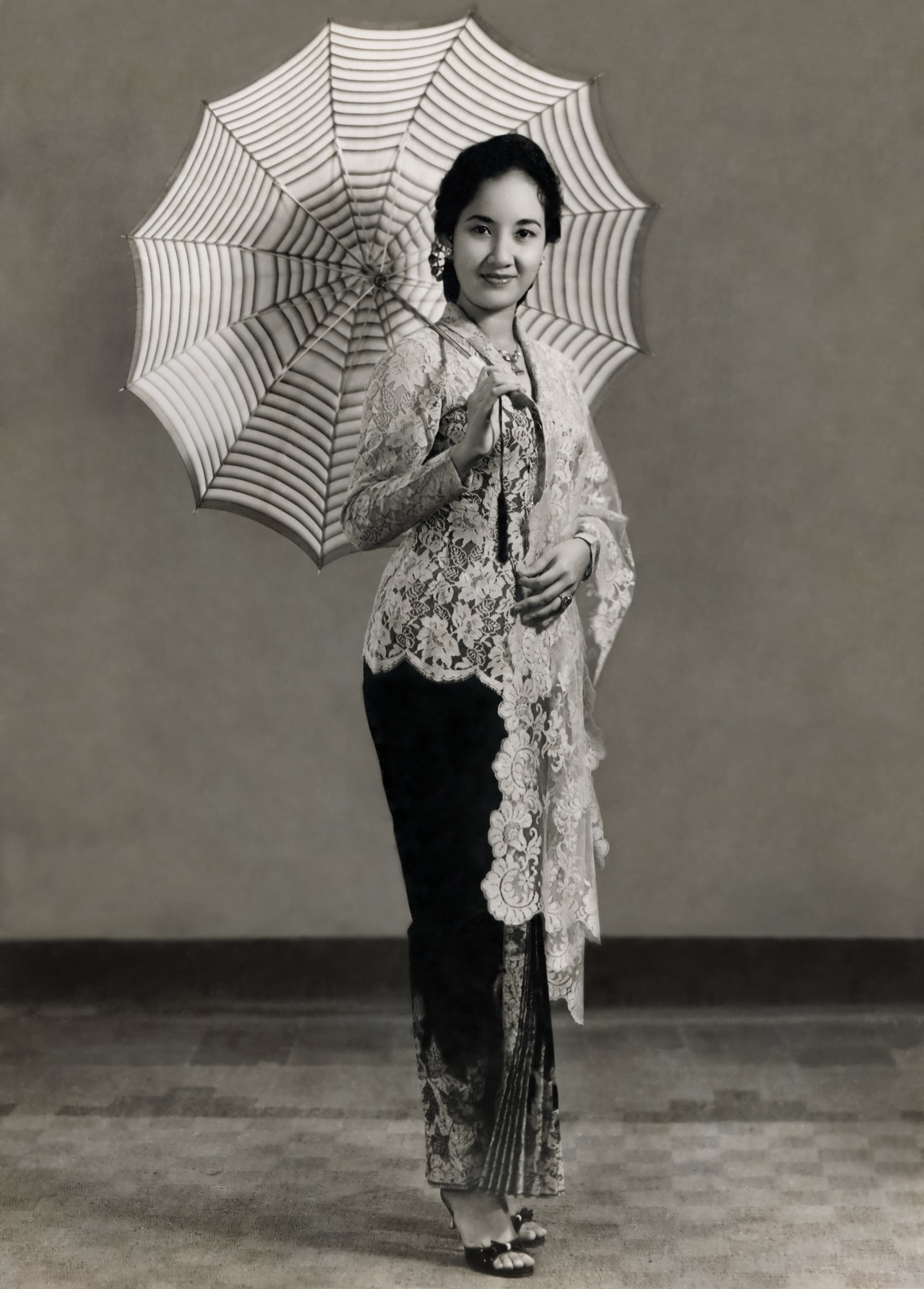
- Dewi, c. 1960
- Born: Rara Patma Dewi Tjitrohadiseikusumo; 26 January 1930; Cirebon, Dutch East Indies
- Died: 28 October 2008 (aged 78); Jakarta, Indonesia
- Occupations: Actress; director

Rara Patma Dewi Tjitrohadiseikusumo (26 January 1930 – 28 October 2008), best known under her stage name Chitra Dewi, was an Indonesian actress and director. She was noted for her roles in Usmar Ismail's films of the 1950s, appearing in films such as Tamu Agung (Exalted Guest, 1955), Tiga Dara (Three Maidens, 1956), and Pedjuang (Warriors for Freedom, 1960), although she remained active in cinema until 1993 and won a Citra Award for Best Supporting Actress at the 1979 Indonesian Film Festival for Gara-gara Isteri Muda (Because of a Young Wife, 1977). Dewi also had a brief stint film directing in 1971, making her one of only six Indonesian women to direct a film before 1998. She was the part of Classical Indonesian Cinema.

== Life and career ==
Chitra Dewi was born Rara Patma Dewi Tjitrohadikusumo in Cirebon, West Java, on 26 January 1930. She completed a senior high school education.

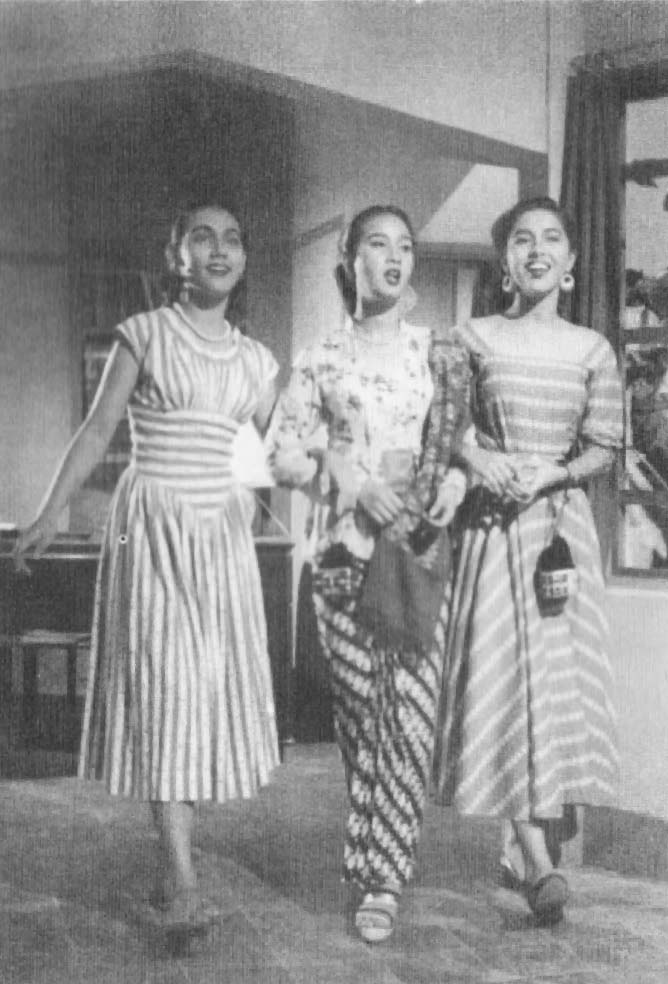
Indriati Iskak, Chitra Dewi, and Mieke Wijaya in Tiga Dara

Dewi made her feature film debut in 1955 with Tamu Agung (Exalted Guest), a satirical political comedy directed by Usmar Ismail for Perfini. However, she only gained recognition the following year, when she starred in the company's musical Tiga Dara (Three Maidens) alongside Mieke Wijaya and Indriati Iskak. This film, which became Perfini's greatest commercial success and spawned a series of look-alike competitions in which women would attempt to act as the film's titular three women, followed the love lives of three sisters who lived with their grandmother. According to the film historian Misbach Yusa Biran, Dewi was considered to represent the ideal Indonesian woman: softspoken and constrained.

Dewi remained with Perfini into the 1960s, appearing in such films as Djendral Kantjil (General Deermouse, 1958) and Pedjuang (Warriors for Freedom, 1960); the latter film was screened in competition at the 2nd Moscow International Film Festival in 1961. She also appeared on stage in productions by the National Theater Academy in Jakarta. In the meantime, she began to appear in a number of films by other companies, including Persari (Holiday in Bali, 1962), Panah Mas Film (Bing Slamet Merantau [Bing Slamet Wanders], 1962), and Agora Film (beginning with Lembah Hidjau [Green Valley, 1963] and continuing until Darah Nelajan [Fisherman's Blood, 1965]).

In the late 1960s, while remaining active as an actress, Dewi began to become involved behind the scenes. She established her own film production company, Chitra Dewi Film Production, and in 1967 produced her first film: 2 X 24 Djam (2 X 24 Hours). This company produced five further films, including three directed by Dewi herself— Bertjinta dalam Gelap (Making Love in the Dark), Dara-Dara (Maidens), and Penunggang Kuda Dari Tjimande (The Horseman of Cimande) (all 1971). These films were unsuccessful, and subsequently Dewi focused on acting. In 1971 she was recognized by the Journalists' Union of Indonesia for her performance in Nji Ronggeng (The Ronggeng, 1969).

In the 1970s and 1980s Dewi was cast predominantly in supporting roles, including in Fred Young's romance Putri Solo (Daughter of Solo, 1974), Asrul Sani's drama Kemelut Hidup (Complexities of Life, 1977), and Wahyu Sihombing's drama Gara-gara Isteri Muda (Because of a Young Wife, 1977). For this last film, she received the Citra Award for Best Supporting Actress at the 1979 Indonesian Film Festival. Dewi performed in a further twenty films in the 1980s and 1990s, ending her feature film career with Pedang Ulung (Grand Sword) in 1993, a year after receiving a lifetime achievement award from the National Film Council. She received another lifetime achievement award at the 2007 Bandung Film Festival.

== Death and legacy ==
Dewi saw a downturn in her health in 2006, following the death of Bambang Samsudi, her eldest son. In March 2008, she spent two weeks in Pondok Indah Hospital after being admitted for malnutrition. Her poor health continued, however, and at 14:00 Western Indonesian Time (UTC +7) on 28 October 2008, she died at the home of her second and youngest child, Agus Erwin, in South Jakarta, at the age of 78. She was buried at Jabang Bayi Cemetery in Cirebon near her parents and son.

Only six female directors appeared in Indonesian cinema until 1998; aside from Chitra Dewi, these women directors were Ratna Asmara, Roostijati, Sofia W.D., Ida Farida, and Rima Melati. Of these, all except Farida had previous experience as actresses. These directors rarely, if ever, received the same recognition as their male counterparts, and acting remained the only way for a woman in the industry to gain recognition.

Since the fall of Suharto in 1998, the number of women directors has increased dramatically. Several of them have received national and international recognition. The earliest in this generation are Mira Lesmana and Nan Achnas, who collaborated with several other directors in Kuldesak (1999). Further examples include Nia Dinata, who has had two of her films, Ca-bau-kan (The Courtesan, 2002) and Berbagi Suami (Love for Share, 2006), submitted for an Academy Award for Best Foreign Language Film; and Djenar Maesa Ayu, whose Mereka Bilang, Saya Monyet! (They Say I'm a Monkey!, 2008) was on several lists of the best Indonesian films of 2008.

== Filmography ==
During her fifty-year career, Dewi acted in more than eighty films. She also produced four, directed three, and wrote two. Dewi was also active in television, including in such series as Dr. Sartika (1989–1991), Jendela Hati (Heart's Window, 1994), Kedasih (1995), and Dua Pilar (Two Pillars, 1997).

=== As crew ===
- 2 X 24 Djam (1967; as producer)
- Samiun dan Dasima (1970; as producer)
- Bertjinta dalam Gelap (1971; as director, producer, and writer)
- Dara-Dara (1971; as director and writer)
- Penunggang Kuda Dari Tjimande (1971; as director, producer, and script editor)

=== As actress ===
- Tamu Agung (1955)
- Djuara 1960 (1956)
- Tiga Dara (1956)
- Delapan Pendjuru Angin (1957)
- Tiga Buronan (1957)
- Djendral Kantjil (1958)
- Pak Prawiro (1958)
- Asrama Dara (1958)
- Habis Gelap Terbitlah Terang (1959)
- Pedjuang (1960)
- Ratu-ratu Rumah Tangga (1960)
- Tjita-Tjita Ajah (1960)
- Tak Terduga (1960)
- Djumpa Diperjalanan (1961)
- Melati Dibalik Terali (1961)
- Holiday in Bali (1962)
- Bing Slamet Merantau (1962)
- Lembah Hidjau (1963)
- Semusim Lalu (1964)
- Darah Nelajan (1965)
- Bunga Putih (1966)
- Gita Taruna (1966)
- 2 X 24 Djam (1967)
- Nji Ronggeng (1969)
- Hidup, Tjinta dan Air Mata (1970)
- Romansa (1970)
- Samiun dan Dasima (1970)
- Penunggang Kuda dari Tjimande (1971)
- Ratna (1971)
- Belas Kasih (1973)
- Bulan di Atas Kuburan (1973)
- Bobby (1974)
- Aku Mau Hidup (1974)
- Ali Baba (1974)
- Pengorbanan (1974)
- Putri Solo (1974)
- Prahara (Betinanya Seorang Perempuan) (1974)
- Maria, Maria, Maria (1974)
- Suster Maria (1974)
- Sayangilah Daku (1974)
- Bunga Roos dari Cikembang (1975)
- Chicha (1976)
- Ganasnya Nafsu (1976)
- Terminal Terakhir (1977)
- Kemelut Hidup (1977)
- Rahasia Seorang Ibu (1977)
- Ateng Bikin Pusing (1977)
- Yoan (1977)
- Gara-gara Isteri Muda (1977)
- Terminal Cinta (1977)
- Semau Gue (1977)
- Duo Kribo (1977)
- Rhoma Irama Berkelana I (1978)
- Rhoma Irama Berkelana II (1978)
- Begadang (1978)
- Si Ronda Macan Betawi (1978)
- Gadis Kampus (1979)
- Mencari Cinta (1979)
- Kabut Sutra Ungu (1979)
- Remaja-remaja (1979)
- Perjuangan dan Doa (1980)
- Amalia SH (1981)
- Bukan Impian Semusim (1981)
- Nila di Gaun Putih (1981)
- Si Pitung Beraksi Kembali (1981)
- Sekuntum Mawar Putih (1981)
- Bawalah Aku Pergi (1981)
- Simphony yang Indah (1981)
- Mendung Tak Selamanya Kelabu (1982)
- Rumput-Rumput yang Bergoyang (1983)
- Kadarwati (1983)
- Dia Sang Penakluk (1984)
- Sebening Kaca (1985)
- Takdir Marina (1986)
- Pendekar Bukit Tengkorak (1987)
- Saur Sepuh (Satria Madangkara) (1988)
- Jurus Dewa Naga (1989)
- Rio Sang Juara (1989)
- Turangga (1990)
- Pengantin Remaja (1991)
- Pedang Ulung (1993)
