= Suzzanna: Buried Alive =

Suzzanna: Bernapas dalam Kubur (Suzzanna: Buried Alive)
- Directed by: Rocky Soraya; Anggy Umbara
- Written by: Bene Dion Rajagukguk
- Starring: Luna Maya; Herjunot Ali; Teuku Rifnu Wikana
- Distributed by: Netflix
- Release date: November 15, 2018
- Country: Indonesia
- Language: Indonesian

Suzzanna: Bernapas dalam Kubur (Suzzanna: Buried Alive) is a 2018 Indonesian horror film directed by Rocky Soraya and Anggy Umbara and written by Bene Dion Rajagukguk. It is a remake of the 1981 film titled Sundelbolong directed by Sisworo Gautama Putra, and a homage to its star, "queen of Indonesian horror" Suzzanna.

== Plot ==
In 1989, Satria, director of a cable manufacturing factory, and his wife Suzzanna eagerly expect their first child. At work, Satria rejects the demand for wage raises from his employees Umar and Jonal. Soon after, Satria leaves for a business trip. Umar and Jonal conspire with two other employees, Dudun and Gino, to rob Satria's house.

Amid their burglary, Suzzanna returns. In a scuffle, she unmasks them, and is accidentally impaled on a sharp bamboo pole. Believing her dead, the culprits begin burying her. Upon discovering she is alive, they nevertheless proceed to bury her alive to avoid going to prison.

Suzzanna awakens inside her house and realizes to her shock that she has become a sundel bolong. When Satria returns shortly afterwards, Suzzanna, though torn by sadness, leaves him oblivious. However, the house servants eventually discover her nature, and Suzzanna lets them leave.

Suzzanna begins stalking her killers one by one. She lures Dudun from his work dormitory into the factory to decapitate him. Umar, Jonal and Gino seek out the services of witch doctor Mbah Turu, Gino's uncle. Turu declares that while it is taboo for a sundel bolong to directly kill humans, it can manipulate them into killing themselves or each other. When Suzzanna haunts Jonal, he stabs her, only to realized he has killed Gino. Umar, Jonal and Turu devise a plan to trap and exorcise Suzzanna by destroying her home and killing her husband, realizing they are her anchor on Earth.

Hearing gossip about Suzzanna's hauntings, Satria became suspicious of his wife's nature. His suspicion is confirmed after she reacts painfully to him reading from the Quran and he finds and unearths her body.

Umar and Jonal lead a mob of villagers to Satria's house, burning it. They incapacitate Suzzanna by driving a kris into her head. Then, deceiving Satria by claiming that Suzzanna has been possessed by a demon, they prepare him for the supposed exorcism. When Jonal tries to kill him, Satria realizes that these are his wife's murderers, and releases her.

As Jonal and Turu flee into the woods, Satria fights and kills Umar, but is stabbed in the back. Suzzanna causes Turu to impale himself on a pointed tree branch, then kills Jonal by burying him alive. By personally slaying a human, Suzzanna's ties to the Earth are severed and she dies in Satria's arms. Soon after, Satria succumbs to his wound and rejoins his wife in the afterlife.

== Cast ==
- Luna Maya as Suzzanna
- Herjunot Ali as Satria
- Teuku Rifnu Wikana as Umar
- Verdi Solaiman as Jonal
- Kiki Narendra as Gino
- Alex Abbad as Dudun
- Asri Welas as Mia
- Opie Kumis as Pak Rojali
- Ence Bagus as Tohir
- Norman R. Akyuwen as Mbah Turu
- Clift Sangra as Pak Bekti

== Accolades ==
Award	Date of ceremony	Category	Recipient(s)	Result	Ref.
Bandung Film Festival	22 November 2019	Best Film	Suzzanna: Buried Alive	Nominated	
Bandung Film Festival	22 November 2019	Best Actress	Luna Maya	Won	
Bandung Film Festival	22 November 2019	Best Original Music Score	Andhika Triyadi	Won	
Bandung Film Festival	22 November 2019	Best Art Direction	Tommy D. Setyanto, Rico Marpaung	Nominated	
Bandung Film Festival	22 November 2019	Best Editing	Sastha Sunu	Nominated	
Indonesian Box Office Movie Awards	5 April 2019	Best Actress	Luna Maya	Nominated	
Indonesian Box Office Movie Awards	5 April 2019	Best Supporting Actor	Verdi Solaiman	Nominated	
Indonesian Box Office Movie Awards	5 April 2019	Best Ensemble Cast	Suzzanna: Buried Alive	Nominated	
Indonesian Box Office Movie Awards	5 April 2019	Best Film Poster	Suzzanna: Buried Alive	Won	
Indonesian Box Office Movie Awards	5 April 2019	Best Film Trailer	Suzzanna: Buried Alive	Nominated	
Indonesian Box Office Movie Awards	5 April 2019	Best Original Soundtrack	Vina Panduwinata (Selamat Malam)	Nominated	
Indonesian Movie Actors Awards	14 March 2019	Best Actress	Luna Maya	Nominated	
Indonesian Movie Actors Awards	14 March 2019	Best Supporting Actor	Teuku Rifnu Wikana	Nominated	
Indonesian Movie Actors Awards	14 March 2019	Best Ensemble	Suzzanna: Buried Alive	Nominated	
Indonesian Movie Actors Awards	14 March 2019	Favorite Actress	Luna Maya	Won	
Indonesian Movie Actors Awards	14 March 2019	Favorite Supporting Actor	Teuku Rifnu Wikana	Nominated	
Maya Awards	19 January 2019	Best Actress	Luna Maya	Won	
Maya Awards	19 January 2019	Best Supporting Actor	Verdi Solaiman	Nominated	
Maya Awards	19 January 2019	Best Art Direction	Tommy D. Setyanto, Rico Marpaung	Nominated	
Maya Awards	19 January 2019	Best Sound Design	Khikmawan Santosa, Madun, Anhar Moha & Suhadi	Nominated	
Maya Awards	19 January 2019	Best Makeup & Hairstyling	Adi Wahono, Peter Gorshenin & Tatiana Melkomova	Won	
Maya Awards	19 January 2019	Best Special Effects	Suzzanna: Buried Alive	Nominated	
Maya Awards	19 January 2019	Best Costume Design	Suzzanna: Buried Alive	Nominated	
Maya Awards	19 January 2019	Best Poster Design	Suzzanna: Buried Alive	Nominated	
