= Tiga Dara =

1956 film by Usmar Ismail

- Flyer
- Directed by: Usmar Ismail
- Written by: Usmar Ismail; M. Alwi Dahlan
- Starring: Chitra Dewi; Mieke Wijaya; Indriati Iskak
- Cinematography: Max Tera
- Edited by: Soemardjono
- Music by: Saiful Bahri
- Distributed by: Perfini
- Release date: 24 August 1957
- Running time: 115 minutes
- Country: Indonesia
- Language: Indonesian

Tiga Dara (Indonesian for Three Maidens) is a 1957 Indonesian musical drama film starring Chitra Dewi, Mieke Wijaya, and Indriati Iskak. Directed by Usmar Ismail for Perfini, the film follows three sisters who live with their father and grandmother. When the eldest sister, Nunung, shows no interest in marrying, her family tries unsuccessfully to find a husband for her. Nunung initially rejects the advances of a young man named Toto, who instead dates her younger sister. However, when he becomes jealous and travels from Jakarta to Bandung to profess his love, she agrees to marry him.

Produced using government credit and written in an attempt to cover Perfini's outstanding debts, Tiga Dara was intended to be commercial despite Ismail's disapproval of such works. After it was released on 24 August 1957, the film was an immense popular success, launching the careers of its stars, earning the highest box office returns of any Perfini film, and being screened in first-class cinemas. However, even though Tiga Dara was shown at the 1959 Venice Film Festival and received Best Musical Arrangement at the 1960 Indonesian Film Week, Ismail considered it a compromise of his initial vision for Perfini.

Since its release, Tiga Dara has been considered a classic of Indonesian cinema, with themes which remain relevant for modern Indonesian society. It was remade as Tiga Dara Mencari Cinta (Three Maidens Seek Love) in 1980 by Djun Saptohadi and influenced Teguh Karya's Pacar Ketinggalan Kereta (Lover Left by the Train, 1989). A second remake, Ini Kisah Tiga Dara (This Is the Tale of the Three Maidens), was produced by Nia Dinata and released in September 2016. In 2015 Tiga Dara was restored and converted to 4K digital by L'immagine Ritrovata Laboratory.

== Plot ==
Three sisters—Nunung (Chitra Dewi), Nana (Mieke Wijaya) and Nenny (Indriati Iskak)—are being raised by their grandmother (Fifi Young) in Jakarta after their mother's death. Though the sisters' father Sukandar (Hassan Sanusi) lives with them, he is too involved in his own work to pay them heed.

While the sisters are out with Nana's boyfriend Herman (Bambang Irawan), their grandmother tells Sukandar that before she dies, she wants the 29-year-old Nunung married, something their mother had wished to see. He agrees to invite his colleagues to the house, and Nunung impresses them by playing piano and singing. However, the men are all too old, and Nunung's grandmother insists that Sukandar find a younger man. Nenny, eavesdropping, suggests that they hold a party; however throughout, Nunung is completely disinterested.

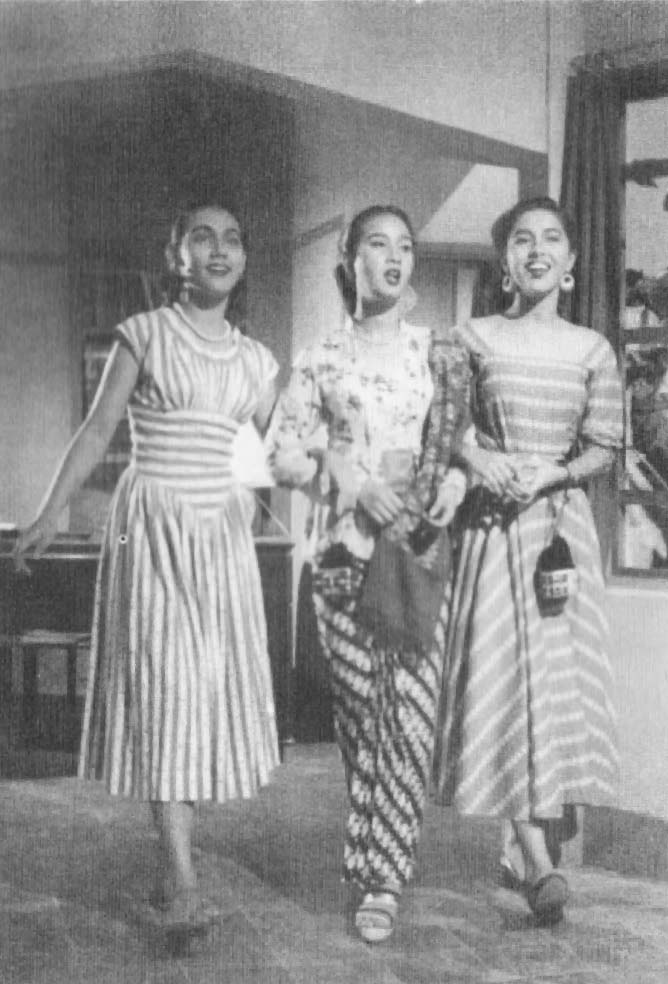
Indriati Iskak, Chitra Dewi, and Mieke Wijaya in Tiga Dara

Nana is then asked to take Nunung out with her, in the hopes that she will meet a man herself. At a party, while Nana mingles with several men, Nunung sits out every dance and eventually leaves with Herman. She tells her grandmother that she felt too old among the younger partygoers and asks why she was told to go. Nenny, again eavesdropping, shouts out the truth. Though Nunung is initially angered, she understands her grandmother's intentions.

The following day, Nunung is stricken by a scooter driven by Toto (Rendra Karno). Despite an injured leg, Nunung insists on taking a pedicab home; without her knowledge, Toto follows her to apologize, and, though Nunung treats him harshly, is quickly accepted by Nana and her grandmother. Nana asks Toto to visit frequently, and over the next several days Nana pushes away Herman. Nenny, meanwhile, uses her sister's interest in Toto to become closer to Herman. When Nana announces that she and Toto are engaged, her grandmother is furious, worrying that Nunung will never marry.

After Nana and Nunung fight, their guardians decide that it is best for Nunung to go the home of her uncle Tamsil (Usmar Ismail) in Bandung and rest. While there, Nunung writes a letter, saying that a person named Joni kisses her goodnight every day. This news sparks Nenny's titillation and Toto's jealousy. Nana insists that Toto choose between her and Nunung; Toto decides to go to Bandung and protest Joni's impropriety. He confronts Nunung and confesses his love for her. She spitefully says that she sleeps in the same room as Joni every night.

Herman, at the insistence of Nana, takes the remainder of the family to Bandung, where they meet up with Toto, Nunung, and Tamsil's family. As Tamsil introduces his sons, Joni is revealed to be a young child. Nunung and Toto embrace, while Nana and Herman make up.

== Cast ==
- Chitra Dewi as Nunung
- Mieke Wijaya as Nana
- Indriati Iskak as Nenny
- Fifi Young as Grandmother
- Rendra Karno as Toto
- Bambang Irawan as Herman
- Hassan Sanusi as Sukandar
- Usmar Ismail as Uncle Tamsil
- Roosilawaty as Dancer

== Production ==
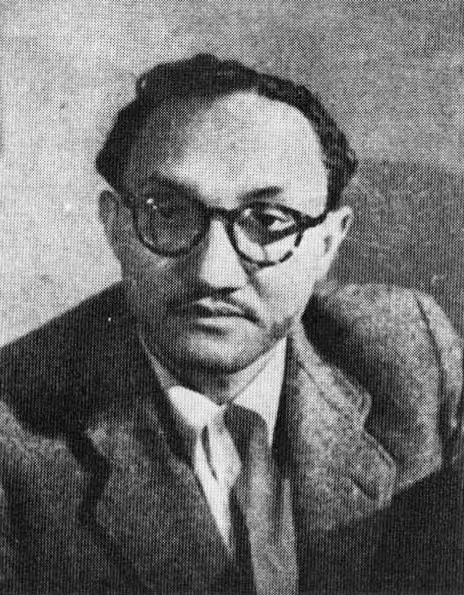
Usmar Ismail, director and producer of Tiga Dara

Tiga Dara was directed and produced by Usmar Ismail for his National Film Company (Perusahaan Film Nasional, better known as Perfini). Although Ismail had wanted to "not consider commercial aspects" (Note: Original: "... tidak akan mempertimbangkan segi komersial.") of filmmaking when he established Perfini in 1950, he was forced to recognise the need to make a profitable film as Perfini continued to lose money. Following the failures of Lagi-Lagi Krisis (More Crises, 1955) and Tamu Agung (Exalted Guest, 1955), the company's financial situation was bleak, and Ismail fired a number of his staff. With only some leftover government credit to finance his next production, (Note: In 1956 Perfini received Rp 2,500,000 in credit to finance film production (Ismail 1958, p. 9).) Ismail collaborated with M. Alwi Dahlan to write a film which would be popular with audiences. The resulting story, which may have been inspired by the 1936 musical comedy Three Smart Girls, was Tiga Dara.

Production of Tiga Dara began in March 1956. Chitra Dewi, Mieke Wijaya, and Indriati Iskak were cast as the titular maidens. Dewi had previously appeared in Tamu Agung, and Wijaya had made her debut in the Palembang Film Corporation's Gagal (Fail) the previous year. Iskak, the 14-year-old daughter of film director Raden Iskak, made her feature film debut with Tiga Dara. Supporting roles were filled by Fifi Young, Rendra Karno, Hassan Sanusi, Bambang Irawan, Roosilawaty, and Zainab. For the role of Joni, Ismail cast his real-life son, Irwan Usmar Ismail.

As musical films were popular with Indonesian audiences, Tiga Dara was made in that genre. It featured seven songs by Saiful Bahri (Note: "Tiga Dara" ("Three Maidens"), "Tjita-Tjita" ("Dreams"), "Senandung Lagu Lama" ("Singing an Old Song"), "Tamasja" ("Holiday"), "Lagu Gembira" ("Joyous Song"), "Bimbang Tanpa Pegangan" ("Confused, Without Guidance"), and "Djoget Gembira" ("Joyous Dance") (Ismail 1957, 00:01:07)) (who also served as sound editor) as well as one by Ismail Marzuki (Note: "Pilih Menantu" ("To Choose a Child In-Law") (Ismail 1957, 00:01:07)) and two by Oetjin Noerhasjim. (Note: "Letnan Hardi" ("Lieutenant Hardi") and "Siapa Namanja" ("What's Her Name") (Ismail 1957, 00:01:07)) Only Wijaya provided her own vocals; the other actors were dubbed by Sam Saimun, Elly Sri Kudus, Bing Slamet, Djuita, S. Effendy, and Sitti Nurochma. Long-time Perfini cameraman Max Tera handled cinematography for this black-and-white film, using the company's outdated equipment, and Soemardjono was in charge of editing.

== Release and reception ==
Tiga Dara premiered on 24 August 1957 at the Capitol Theatre in Jakarta. Distributed by Perfini and advertised in part with trucks and megaphones, the film found popular success. It was screened for eight consecutive weeks in cinemas throughout the archipelago, including several first-class cinemas affiliated with the American Motion Picture Association of Indonesia (AMPAI) which mostly showed imported films. (Note: Domestic productions were only rarely screened at Indonesia's first-class cinemas. Other Indonesian films shown at AMPAI-affiliated cinemas during the 1950s included Ismail's Darah dan Doa (The Long March, 1950) and Krisis (Crisis, 1953), as well as BK Raj's Djandjiku (My Promise, 1956) (Imanda 2014, p. 178).) On 20 September 1957, President Sukarno arranged for a private screening of Tiga Dara at the Presidential Palace in Bogor for the birthday of his wife, Hartini. The film was also commonly screened at wedding parties. "Tiga Dara" competitions between groups of three sisters were held in much of Java, and the term became widely used as the name of batik products, shops, and drinks. At the 1960 Indonesian Film Week, Tiga Dara received Best Musical Arrangement.

Negotiations to bring Tiga Dara to Malaya began soon after its release, and the film was exported, again to commercial success, in exchange for the import of the Malayan film Mega Mendung (Cloudy Skies). (Note: This was unusual; generally three Malayan films were imported for every Indonesian film exported (Java-Bode 1957).) In the late 1950s the film was shown in several Italian cities, including Rome, as well as in Yugoslavia. After Floris Ammannati, director of the 1959 Venice Film Festival, saw the Rome screening, he invited Ismail to show Tiga Dara in Venice. Ismail did so, though he considered the screening to be unsuccessful. (Note: In his report on the festival, Ismail wrote that Tiga Dara had failed to resonate with audiences as the film had not been given any subtitles. As such, viewers, though they enjoyed the music, were unable to follow the story (Ismail 1983, p. 136).) Tiga Dara was screening in Netherlands New Guinea by August 1960 and in Suriname by August 1963.

== Impact ==
Tiga Dara was Perfini's most lucrative film, grossing almost Rp 10 million in ticket sales, or a profit of Rp 3,080,000, during its theatrical run. However, despite this popular success Perfini's financial situation saw little improvement. Furthermore, Ismail considered the Tiga Dara a disappointment that compromised the goals he had had when he established Perfini. According to fellow Perfini film director D. Djajakusuma:

Usmar [Ismail] was ashamed of the film. His intent to sell Tiga Dara when it was still in production showed how difficult it was for him to accept the fact that he had to make that kind of film. ... even though money was coming in, Perfini just was not making the kinds of films that Usmar had dreamed of initially. (Note: Original: "Usmar sangat malu dengan film itu. Niatnya menjual Tiga Dara ketika masih dalam tahap pembikinan memperlihatkan betapa beratnya bagi dia menerima kenyataan bahwa harus membuat film seperti itu. ... meskipun uang masuk, Perfini toh tidak lagi membikin film-film seperti yang dicita-citakan Usmar semula.")

— D. Djajakusuma, in Said (1982, p. 57)

In subsequent years Perfini released a number of commercially oriented films, such as Delapan Pendjuru Angin (Eight Compass Directions, 1957) and Asrama Dara (Dormitory for Girls, 1958). Though none of these were commercial failures, none except for Asrama Dara approached the financial success of Tiga Dara. Ismail attempted to reassert himself as a director of quality not-for-profit films through Pedjuang (Warriors for Freedom, 1960), which was screened in competition at the 2nd Moscow International Film Festival in 1961. However, as the years passed he became increasingly distanced from his early goals and had made attempts to enter banking, the nightclub industry, and parliament by the time of his death in 1971.

Dewi and Wijaya both became popular following the success of Tiga Dara. Dewi continued acting for a further four decades, appearing in her final feature film, Pedang Ulung (Grand Sword), in 1993, fifteen years before her death. Wijaya, meanwhile, has continued acting through 2008's Ayat-Ayat Cinta (Verses of Love). Meanwhile, Iskak, who was praised for having a more naturalistic acting style than her stage-trained fellow actors, soared to popularity. She formed a girl group, the Baby Dolls, together with Rima Melati, Gaby Mambo, and Baby Huwae, and acted in a further eight films before retiring from cinema in 1963.

== Legacy ==
Tiga Dara has been recognised as a classic of Indonesian cinema and often been shown on television. A 1987 retrospective on Perfini in Tempo argued that the film still showed the sense of honesty and realism common in Ismail's earlier work, and, in a 1991 memorial book for Ismail, Rosihan Anwar wrote that the themes of Tiga Dara remained relevant for the Indonesian people. Similar sentiments were voiced by the film director Nia Dinata in 2016.

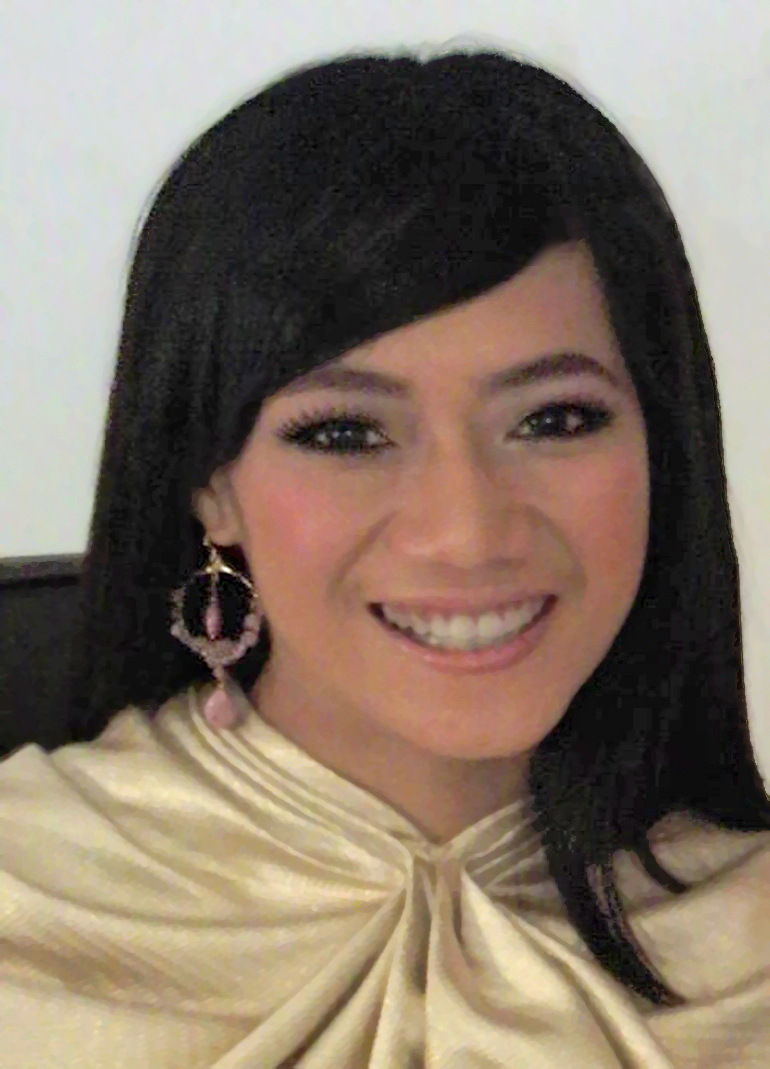
Nia Dinata remade Tiga Dara as Ini Kisah Tiga Dara in 2016.

By 2015 the cellulose acetate negatives for Tiga Dara, held at Sinematek Indonesia, (Note: Sinematek also holds a high-quality distribution copy of the film (Masak 1986, p. 62).) were heavily damaged. They were torn in places, and scenes were besmirched by fungus or lost altogether. To better preserve the film for future generations, SA Films arranged for Tiga Dara to be restored by the Bologna-based L'immagine Ritrovata Laboratory; the film was the second of Ismail's oeuvre to be restored, following Lewat Djam Malam (After the Curfew, 1954) in 2012. Restoration work, which included the reinsertion of lost scenes using extant copies of the film and the removal of dust and fungus, began in early 2015 and was completed on 8 October 2015. This restoration—converted to 4K digital—was screened Indonesia beginning on 11 August 2016, with a soundtrack album featuring covers by nine artists being launched on the same day. The Jakarta Post described the film as "a hit with audience members". A DVD and Blu-ray release was scheduled for 2017.

Several films have been remade or influenced by Tiga Dara. A remake, Tiga Dara Mencari Cinta (Three Maidens Seek Love), was directed by Djun Saptohadi and released in 1980. This comedy starred Ingrid Fernandez, Nana Riwayatie, and Winny Aditya Dewi as three sisters (Note: Named Maya, Emma, and Nuri in this version (Gemini Satria Film 1980).) who live with their father and face the trials and tribulations of dating. Eight years later, when Teguh Karya was directing Pacar Ketinggalan Kereta (Lover Left by the Train, 1989), he insisted that the cast and crew watch Tiga Dara in an attempt to transcend it. In Tempo, the writer Putu Wijaya later described Pacar Ketinggalan Kereta as seemingly trying to recapture the family and musical dynamics of Ismail's story. In 2004 a remake of Tiga Dara, to be directed by Rudi Soedjarwo and involve Dian Sastrowardoyo, Siti Nurhaliza, and Krisdayanti, was announced, though this production has not been realized.

Another updated retelling of the Tiga Dara story, Ini Kisah Tiga Dara (This is the Story of Three Maidens), was shot between 23 February and 27 March 2016 in Maumere, Flores. In a press conference, the film's director, Nia Dinata, stated that she had enjoyed watching Tiga Dara as a child and that she remained awed by the film's beauty. She also said that her retelling, though it was inspired by and maintained the spirit of Ismail's original, featured a new plot as well as new songs by Titiek Puspa: the film follows three sisters who move to Maumere, Flores, to help their father manage a hotel. Ini Kisah Tiga Dara, which stars Shanty, Tara Basro, and Tatyana Akman, was released on 1 September 2016.

== Works cited ==
- "1961 year". moscowfilmfestival.ru. Moscow International Film Festival. Archived from the original on 28 August 2016.
- Anwar, Rosihan (1991). Peringatan 20 Tahun Wafatnya H. Usmar Ismail Bapak Perfilman Indonesia (1971–1991) [In Memorial: 20 Years (1971–1991) After the Death of the Father of Indonesian Cinema, H. Usmar Ismail] (booklet) (in Indonesian). Committee for the Indonesian Film Festival.
- Bahar, Alvin (22 June 2016). "Selesai Direstorasi, Film Tempo Dulu "Tiga Dara" Akan Diputar Lagi mulai 11 Agustus 2016" [After Restoration, the Old Film "Tiga Dara" to be Screened in Theatres Beginning 11 August 2016]. Kompas (in Indonesian). Archived from the original on 25 June 2016.
- Biran, Misbach Yusa, ed. (1979). Apa Siapa Orang Film Indonesia 1926–1978 [What and Who: Film Figures in Indonesia, 1926–1978]. Jakarta: Sinematek Indonesia. OCLC 6655859.
- Biran, Misbach Yusa (2009). Peran Pemuda dalam Kebangkitan Film Indonesia [The Role of the Youth in the Development of the Indonesian Film Industry] (in Indonesian). Jakarta: Ministry of Youth and Sports. OCLC 607257806.
- "Cinema Luxor" [Luxor Cinema]. Niuew Suriname (in Dutch). 1 August 1963. p. 4 – via Delpher.nl.
- "Filmografi Mieke Wijaya" [Filmography for Mieke Wijaya]. filmindonesia.or.id (in Indonesian). Konfiden Foundation. Archived from the original on 6 March 2016.
- "Filmografi Chitra Dewi" [Filmography for Chitra Dewi]. filmindonesia.or.id (in Indonesian). Jakarta: Konfiden Foundation. Archived from the original on 24 September 2016.
- Galikano, Silvia (30 March 2016). "Nia Dinata Hadirkan Kembali Tiga Dara" [Nia Dinata to Bring Back the Three Maidens] (in Indonesian). CNN Indonesia. Archived from the original on 11 June 2016.
- Heider, Karl G. (1991). Indonesian Cinema: National Culture on Screen. Honolulu: University of Hawaii Press. ISBN 978-0-8248-1367-3.
- Imanda, Tito (2014). "The State Market and the Indonesian Film Industry". In Lenuta Giukin; Janina Falkowska; David Desser (eds.). Small Cinemas in Global Markets: Genres, Identities, Narratives. Lanham, Maryland: Lexington Books. pp. 171–189.
- "Indonesische Speelfilm in Cinemascoop" [Indonesian Film in Cinemascope]. Java-Bode (in Dutch). 6 September 1957. p. 3 – via Delpher.nl.
- "Ini Kisah Tiga Dara". filmindonesia.or.id (in Indonesian). Konfiden Foundation. Archived from the original on 6 September 2016.
- Ismail, Usmar (1957). Tiga Dara [Three Maidens] (in Indonesian). Jakarta: Perfini.
- Ismail, Usmar (1958). "Perfini Sewindu" [Eight Years of Perfini]. Memperingati Sewindu Perfini dengan 8PA [Commemorating Eight Years of Perfini with 8PA] (booklet) (in Indonesian). Jakarta: Perfini. pp. 1, 7–9, 23, 25.
- Ismail, Usmar (1983). "Laporan dari Festival Film Venezia" [Report from the Venice Film Festival]. Usmar Ismail Mengupas Film [Usmar Ismail Discusses Film] (in Indonesian). Jakarta: Sinar Harapan. pp. 131–145. OCLC 10435722.
- Kasih, Moyang (12 August 2016). "Album Aransemen Orisinal Film 'Tiga Dara' Diluncurkan" [Soundtrack Album with Original Arrangement for 'Tiga Dara' Released]. Tempo (in Indonesian). Archived from the original on 13 August 2016.
- Kristanto, JB, ed. (2007). Katalog Film Indonesia 1926 – 2007. Jakarta: Nalar. ISBN 978-979-26-9006-4.
- Kumampung, Dian Reinis (29 March 2016). "Nia Dinata: "Ini Kisah Tiga Dara" Berbeda dari "Tiga Dara"" [Nia Dinata: "Ini Kisah Tiga Dara" will Differ from "Tiga Dara"]. Kompas (in Indonesian). Archived from the original on 16 April 2016.
- Makhsara, Ivan (26 May 2016a). "Saksikan Teaser Resmi Pertama Film Terbaru Nia Dinata, "Ini Kisah Tiga Dara"" [See the First Teaser for Nia Dinata's Latest Film, "Ini Kisah Tiga Dara"]. Rolling Stone Indonesia (in Indonesian). Archived from the original on 23 June 2016.
- Makhsara, Ivan (22 June 2016b). "Pasca Restorasi, Film Klasik 'Tiga Dara' Akan Dirilis Ulang" [Following Restoration, Classic Film 'Tiga Dara' to Be Rereleased]. Rolling Stone Indonesia (in Indonesian). Archived from the original on 21 June 2016.
- Masak, Tanete Pong (1986). "Les Films de Fiction Indonésiens Conservés à la Cinémathèque de Jakarta" [The Indonesian Fiction Films Held at Sinematek Indonesia]. Archipel (in French). 32: 51–63. doi:10.3406/arch.1986.2310. ISSN 0044-8613.
- Perfini, ed. (1960). 10 Tahun Perfini [10 Years of Perfini] (booklet) (in Indonesian). Jakarta: Perfini.
- Pangerang, Andi Muttya Keteng (18 December 2015). "Film Musikal Klasik 'Tiga Dara' Segera Dibuat Ulang" [The Classic Musical 'Tiga Dara' to be Remade]. Kompas (in Indonesian). Archived from the original on 22 August 2016.
- "Restored 'Tiga Dara' Wins New Generation of Fans". The Jakarta Post. 13 August 2016. Archived from the original on 16 August 2016.
- "Rex Theater". Nieuw Guinea Koerier (in Dutch). 11 August 1960. p. 4 – via Delpher.nl.
- Said, Salim (1982). Profil Dunia Film Indonesia [Profile of Indonesian Cinema] (in Indonesian). Jakarta: Grafiti Pers. OCLC 9507803.
- Tiga Dara Mencari Cinta (flyer) (in Indonesian), Gemini Satria Film, 1980
- "Tiga Dara op Paleis Bogor Vertoond" [Tiga Dara Screened at Bogor Palace]. Algemeen Indisch Dagblad de Preangerbode (in Dutch). 23 September 1957. p. 2 – via Delpher.nl.
- Utama, Syatria; Antosiamo; Indrayati, Sri (4 April 1987). "Perfini: Sosok Rawan Idealisme" [Perfini: An Idealistic Entity]. Tempo (in Indonesian). p. 163.
- Wijaya, Putu (14 October 1989). "Menyambung Napas Tiga Dara" [Continuing the Inspiration of Tiga Dara] (in Indonesian). Archived from the original on 4 March 2016.
