= Sundelbolong =

Indonesian horror film

- Directed by: Sisworo Gautama Putra
- Written by: Subagio Samtani
- Produced by: Ram Soraya
- Starring: Suzzanna
- Music by: Gadot Sudarto
- Backgrounds by: Suzzanna
- Production company: Rapi Films
- Release date: 20 September 1981
- Running time: 90 minutes
- Country: Indonesia
- Language: Indonesia

Sundel Bolong or Sundelbolong is a 1981 Indonesian cult horror film directed by Sisworo Gautama Putra. The film is about the Javanese mythical prostitute ghost Sundel Bolong and stars Suzzanna. A remake titled Suzzanna: Bernapas dalam Kubur, directed by Rocky Soraya and Anggy Umbara, was released on November 15, 2018.

== Cast ==
- Suzzanna as Alisa Hendarto / Shinta
- Barry Prima as Hendarto
- Ruth Pelupessy as Mami
- Rudy Salam as Rudi
- Marlia Hardi as Bi Ijah
- Rukman Herman
- HIM Damsyik as Jefri
- Eddy Bakar Pare
- Jack John
- Jafar Breel
- Diana Suarkom
- Bokir as Ceking
- Dorman Borisman as Amin
- Adang Mansyur as The Shaman
