= Dicky Zulkarnaen =

- Born: Dicky Iskandar; 12 October 1939; Batavia, Dutch East Indies
- Died: 10 March 1995 (aged 55); Jakarta, Indonesia
- Years active: 1959–1995
- Spouse: Mieke Wijaya (m. 1963–1995)
- Children: 4, including Nia Zulkarnaen

Dicky Zulkarnaen (12 October 1939 – 10 March 1995) was a prominent and award-winning Indonesian actor. He was the husband of Mieke Wijaya and father of Vanya "Nia" Zulkarnaen, both actresses.

== Personal life ==
=== Illness and death ===
In 1994, Zulkarnaen went into bed rest due to heart disease, and underwent surgery in February 1994 at Mount Elizabeth Hospital in Singapore. After returning to Indonesia, he was hospitalized in March 1994 at Pertamina Central Hospital. His condition began to deteriorate that year, and he was unable to speak and only use a sign language to communicate. On 10 March 1995, Zulkarnaen died at his daughter's residence in Kalibata, South Jakarta, due to heart disease at the age of 55. The night before his death, several film figures such as Dewi Yuli, Deddy Mizwar, Ida Leman, Camelia Malik, and Harry Capri came to visit him.

His funeral was held at Tanah Kusir Cemetery, and was attended by thousands, such as members of Parfi and Gabungan Artis Nusantara. At the funeral several film figures provided eulogies, including Rima Melati, Widyawati, and Misbach Yusa Biran.

== In popular culture ==
Dwiki Dharmawan and Nia Zulkarnaen wrote a song titled "Rinduku" (My Longing) in 1997. Nia dedicated the song to her father.
