= Suzzanna =

Indonesian actress (1942–2008)

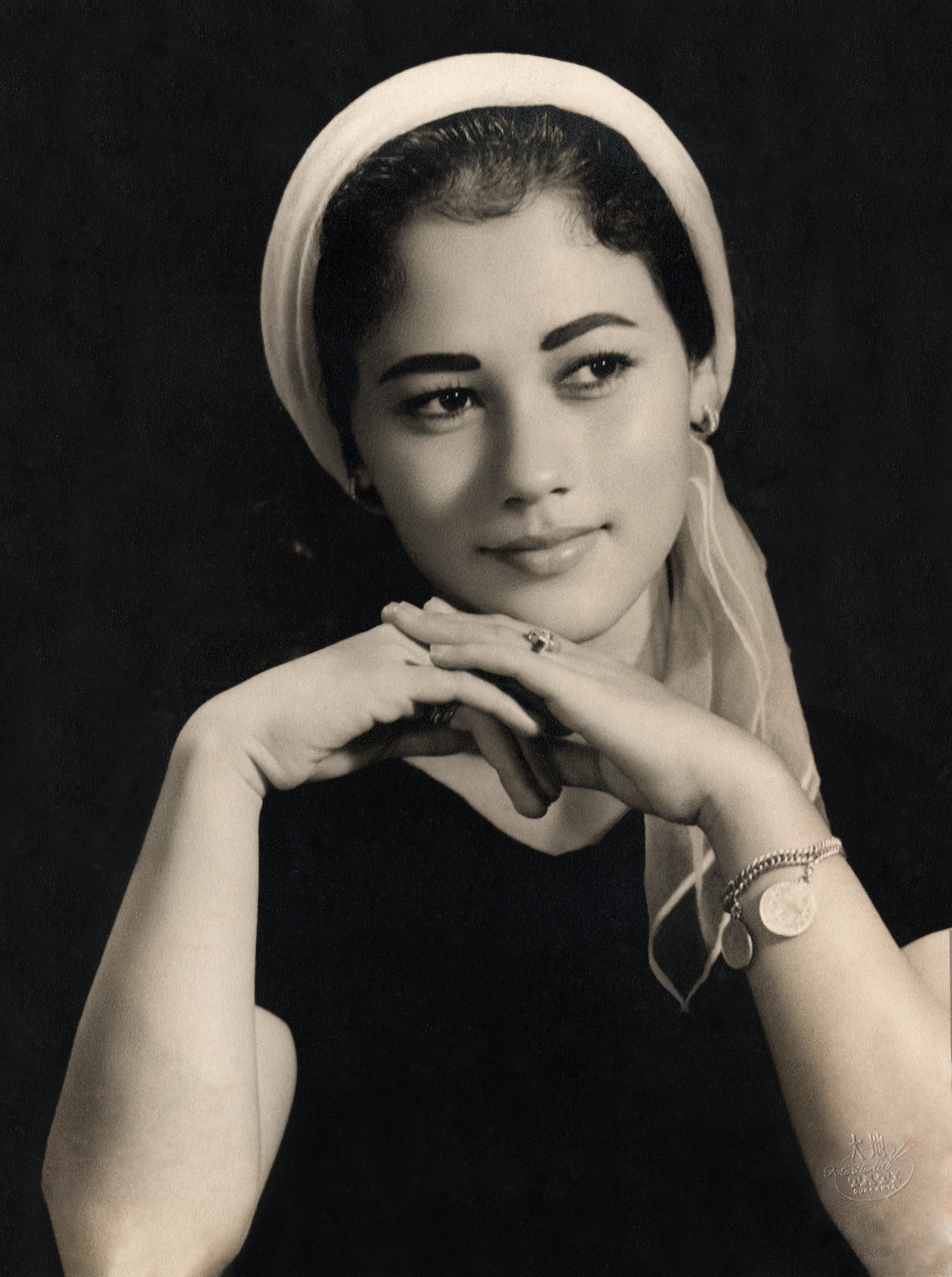
- Suzzanna, c. 1963
- Born: Suzzanna Martha Frederika van Osch; 13 October 1942; Buitenzorg, Japanese-occupied East Indies
- Died: 15 October 2008 (aged 66); Magelang, Central Java, Indonesia
- Occupation: Actress
- Years active: 1957–1991, 2003–2008
- Spouses: Dicky Suprapto (m. 1959; div. 1974) Clift Sangra (m. 1983)
- Children: 3

Suzzanna Martha Frederika van Osch (13 October 1942 – 15 October 2008) was an Indonesian actress. Known as the "Queen of Indonesian horror", she is well-known in particular in Indonesia for portraying spirits, witches, and other supernatural beings. She was crowned the best female antagonist in Indonesian film industry along with Ruth Pelupessy and Mieke Wijaya.

== Biography ==
Suzzanna, who was an Indo of mixed Javanese-Minahasan-Sundanese-German-Dutch heritage, was born Suzzanna Martha Frederica Van Osch on 13 October 1942 in Buitenzorg (now Bogor), West Java, as the youngest child and daughter of the six children of Johanna Bojoh (1915–1997), a singer, and Willem Van Osch (1910–1942), a stage actor from the Netherlands. Her brothers were William Charles Van Osch (born 1937), Janemann Van Osch (1938–1940), and Buce Boyoh (1941–2016), and her sisters were Gerdina Johanna Maria Van Osch (1936–1977) and Irene Beatrix Van Osch (1940–1941).

Suzzanna entered acting in the 1958, following the success of Usmar Ismail's Tiga Dara (1956). Cashing in on the popularity of the film, numerous organizations had begun holding "Tiga Dara" competitions; Suzzana, who had been raised in Magelang, won a such competition in Yogyakarta. She was soon cast in Ismail's film Asrama Dara (1958), in which she portrayed Ina, the daughter of a politician who must stay at a boarding house for girls along with her sister who was portrayed by Nurbani Yusuf. Advertising for this film emphasized Suzzanna and her role, drawing on the previous success of Tiga Dara by touting her as the next Indriati Iskak. Suzzanna's performance was well received by audiences, and in 1960, she was named Best Child Actress Award at the Asian Film Festival; she was also given recognition at the 1960 Indonesian Film Festival.

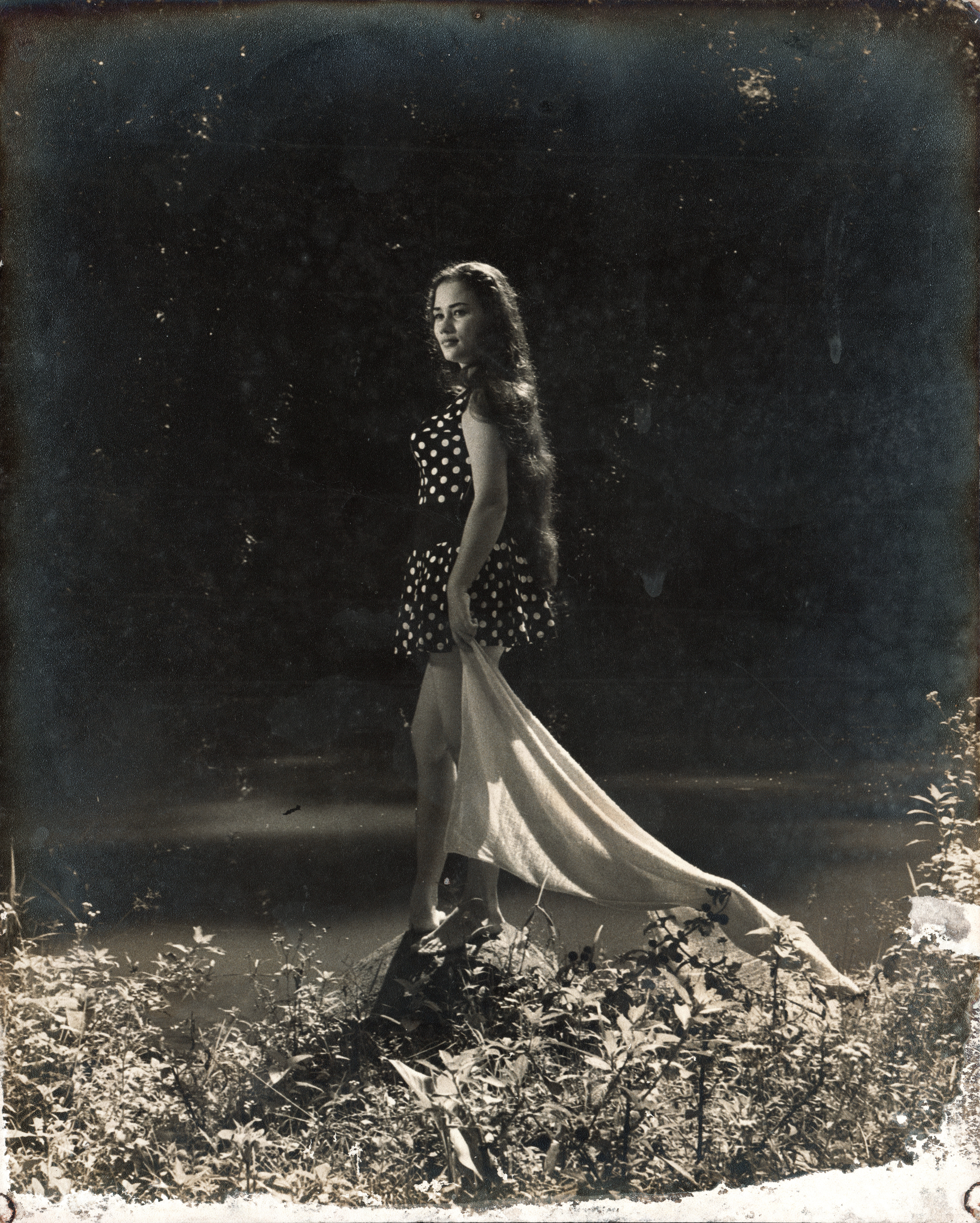
Suzzanna in c. 1963

By the mid-1960s, she had married fellow actor Dicky Suprapto. Together, in 1965, they established the film production company Tri Murni Film, which produced only one film—Segenggam Tanah Perbatasan (1965), starring both Suzzanna and Suprapto—before closing. They collaborated on another film, Suzie, the following year. Their final effort, Tidar Jaya Film, was most successful; it produced four films between 1970 and 1973. The first of these was Tuan Tanah Kedawung (1970), an adaptation of the comic by Ganes TH. In this film, Suzzanna took the role of Ratna, a woman who must protect her husband's land deeds while he is working in Borneo. Tidar Jaya subsequently produced Beranak dalam Kubur (1971), Bumi Makin Panas (1973), and Napsu Gila (1973); all of these featured Suzzanna. Suzzanna's greatest popular success of the 1970s, however, came from another company. In 1970, she was cast in Bernafas dalam Lumpur, a production by Sarinande Films directed by Turino Djunaedy. In this film, Suzzanna portrays a woman who travels to Jakarta in search of her husband, only to fall victim of a human trafficking ring. Controversial for its frank depictions of sexuality and coarse language, the film was banned in Bandung but nonetheless the most popular domestic production of the year. For this film, Suzzanna was crowned as Asia's most popular actress at the 1972 Asia-Pacific Film Festival in Seoul. She later decided that the film's depiction of sexuality was too frank, vowing to not take such roles in the future.

Suzzanna separated from Suprapto in 1974, shortly following Napsu Gila; Tidar Jaya ceased operations soon afterwards. Indonesians knew her as The Indonesian Horror Queen, not only because of her acting but also because of her mystic lifestyle. Some people said that she looked young in her old age because she ate jasmine flowers.

Suzzanna died at her residence in Potrobangsan, North Magelang, Magelang, on 15 October 2008 at the age of 66, after 30 years of battling diabetes.

== Filmography ==
- Asrama Dara (1958)
- Bertamasja (1959)
- Mira (1961)
- Aku Hanja Bajangan (1963)
- Antara Timur dan Barat (1963)
- Segenggam Tanah Perbatasan (1965)
- Suzie (1966)
- Bernafas dalam Lumpur (1970)
- Tuan Tanah Kedawung (1970)
- Air Mata Kekasih (1971)
- Beranak dalam Kubur (1971)
- Napsu Gila (1973)
- Bumi Makin Panas (1973)
- Ratapan dan Rintihan (1974)
- Pulau Cinta (1978)
- Permainan Bulan Desember (1980)
- Ratu Ilmu Hitam (1981)
- Sundel Bolong (1981)
- Lembah Duka (1981)
- Sangkuriang (1982)
- Nyi Blorong (1982)
- Nyi Ageng Ratu Pemikat (1983)
- Perkawinan Nyi Blorong (1983)
- Telaga Angker (1984)
- Dia Sang Penakluk (1984)
- Usia dalam Gejolak (1984)
- Ratu Sakti Calon Arang (1985)
- Bangunnya Nyi Roro Kidul (1985)
- Petualangan Cinta Nyi Blorong (1986)
- Malam Jumat Kliwon (1986)
- Samson dan Delilah (1987)
- Ratu Buaya Putih (1988)
- Santet (1988)
- Malam Satu Suro (1988)
- Wanita Harimau (Santet II) (1989)
- Pusaka Penyebar Maut (1990)
- Titisan Dewi Ular (1990)
- Perjanjian di Malam Keramat (1991)
- Ajian Ratu Laut Kidul (1991)
- Misteri Sebuah Guci (2003) (TV Series)
- Selma & Ular Siluman (2003) (TV Series)
- Hantu Ambulance (2008)

== Awards and nominations ==
Year	Award	Category	Recipients	Result
1979	Indonesian Film Festival	Citra Award for Best Leading Actress	Pulau Cinta	Nominated
1982	Indonesian Film Festival	Citra Award for Best Leading Actress	Ratu Ilmu Hitam	Nominated

== See also ==
- Suzzanna: Buried Alive

== Works cited ==
- Biran, Misbach Yusa, ed. (1979). Apa Siapa Orang Film Indonesia 1926–1978 [What and Who: Film Figures in Indonesia, 1926–1978]. Jakarta: Sinematek Indonesia. OCLC 6655859.
- Imanjaya, Ekky (2006). A to Z about Indonesian Film (in Indonesian). Bandung: Mizan. ISBN 978-979-752-367-1.
- Kristanto, JB, ed. (2007). Katalog Film Indonesia 1926 – 2007. Jakarta: Nalar. ISBN 978-979-26-9006-4.
- "PT Tidar Jaya Film". filmindonesia.or.id (in Indonesian). Konfiden Foundation. Archived from the original on 9 August 2017.
