= Three Sassy Sisters =

- Indonesian: Ini Kisah Tiga Dara
- Directed by: Nia Dinata
- Written by: Nia Dinata; Lucky Kuswandi
- Produced by: Nia Dinata
- Starring: Tara Basro; Shanty; Tatyana Akman; Titiek Puspa; Rio Dewanto; Richard Kyle; Reuben Elishama; Ray Sahetapy; Joko Anwar; Cut Mini Theo
- Cinematography: Yudi Datau
- Edited by: Aline Jusria
- Production companies: Kalyana Shira Films; SA Films
- Release date: September 1, 2016
- Running time: 115 minutes
- Country: Indonesia
- Language: Indonesian

Three Sassy Sisters (Indonesian: Ini Kisah Tiga Dara; lit. This Is a Story of Three Maidens) is a 2016 Indonesian musical film directed by Nia Dinata. The film stars Tara Basro, Shanty, and Tatyana Akman as the three sisters. It was inspired by 1956 film Tiga Dara by Usmar Ismail.

== Premise ==
The film follows three sisters who move to Maumere, Flores to help their father manage a hotel.

== Cast ==
- Tara Basro as Ella
- Shanty as Gendhis
- Tatyana Akman as Bebe
- Titiek Puspa as Grandma
- Rio Dewanto as Yudha
- Richard Kyle as Erick
- Reuben Elishama as Bima
- Ray Sahetapy as Krisna
- Joko Anwar as Taxi Driver
- Cut Mini Theo as Amanda

== Production ==
Dinata revealed that she had enjoyed watching Tiga Dara as a child and that she remained awed by the film's beauty. Titiek Puspa revealed that Dinata herself approached and asked her to be involved in the film. The film was shot in Maumere, East Nusa Tenggara and Jakarta, from February 23 to March 27, 2016.

=== Mencari Tiga Dara ===
In January 2016, Dinata held a casting audition, to find the actress who would play Bebe, the youngest sister. A reality show documenting the process Mencari Tiga Dara was released on the film's YouTube official channel. Nine aspiring actresses were shortlisted, Asmara Abigail, Tatyana Akman, Nala Amrytha, Meirayni Fauziah, Alika Islamadina, Cindy Nirmala, Dea Panendra, Galabby Thahira, and Araminta Waworuntu.

== Music ==
Three Sassy Sisters features music by Titiek Puspa, Aghi Narottama, and Bemby Gusti of Indonesian indie band Sore. It includes two songs . The film's soundtrack, titled Music and Songs from the Film Ini Kisah Tiga Dara, was released on July 20, 2016 through Rooftopsound Records.

Ini Kisah Tiga Dara (Original Motion Picture Soundtrack)
No.	Title	Performer(s)	Length
1.	"The Beginning"	Titiek Puspa; Shanty; Tara Basro; Tatyana Akman; Joko Anwar	5:22
2.	"Tiga Dara" (lit. "The Three Maidens")	Puspa	3:18
3.	"Pasar Geliting" (lit. "Geliting Market")	Shanty; Basro; Akman	2:16
4.	"Anak Dara" (lit. "A Maid")	Shanty	3:28
5.	"Nomor Dua" (lit. "Number Two")	Basro	2:06
6.	"Vowel Song"	Akman	2:36
7.	"Matriarch"	Shanty; Basro; Akman; Puspa	2:26
8.	"Semesta Punya Cara" (lit. "The Universe Has Its Own Way")	Reuben Elishama	3:50
9.	"Senandung Lagu Lama" (lit. "Hums of an Old Song")	Shanty	3:29
10.	"When You Find Me in a Love Story"	Elishama	3:12
11.	"Leave the Past Behind"	Rio Dewanto	3:18
12.	"Tiga Dara" (lit. "The Three Maidens")	Shanty; Basro; Akman	2:59
Total length:			38:25

== Awards and nominations ==
Award	Date of ceremony	Category	Recipient(s)	Result	Ref.
Indonesian Film Festival	November 6, 2016	Best Supporting Actress	Titiek Puspa	Nominated	
Indonesian Film Festival	November 6, 2016	Best Editing	Aline Jusria	Nominated	
Indonesian Film Festival	November 6, 2016	Best Costume Design	Tania Soeprapto	Nominated	
Maya Awards	December 18, 2016	Best Supporting Actress	Titiek Puspa	Nominated	
Maya Awards	December 18, 2016	Best Male Newcomer	Richard Kyle	Nominated	
Maya Awards	December 18, 2016	Best Female Newcomer	Tatyana Akman	Nominated	
