= Nia Zulkarnaen =

Indonesian singer, actress and producer (born 1970)

- Born: 19 June 1970 (age 56); Jakarta, Indonesia
- Other name: Nia Zulkarnain
- Occupations: Actress, singer, producer
- Years active: 1977–present
- Spouses: Alexander David Siahaan (m. 1998; died 2002) Ari Sihasale (m. 2003)
- Parent(s): Dicky Zulkarnaen (father); Mieke Wijaya (mother)
- Website: Official website

Nia Zulkarnaen (born 19 June 1970) is an Indonesian singer, actress and producer. She is the daughter of the actor Dicky Zulkarnaen and veteran Indonesian actress Mieke Wijaya.

== Filmography ==
=== Films ===
- Jeritan Si Buyung (Screams The Boys; 1977)
- Darna Ajaib (Magic Darna; 1980)
- Merpati Tak Pernah Ingkar Janji (Doves never break a promise; 1986)
- Cemburu Nih.. Yee... (Jealous Yes.. Yee...; 1986)
- Sama Juga Bohong (The Same Lie; 1986)
- Aku Benci Kamu (I Hate You; 1987)
- Jodoh Boleh Diatur (Cars May be Regulated; 1988)
- Bukan Main (Absurdly)
- Kristal Kristal Cinta (Crystals of the Love; 1989)
- Isabella (1990)
- Lagu Untuk Seruni (Songs For Seruni; 1991)
- Pintar-Pintaran (Ingenious-Clever; 1992)
- Denias, Senandung Di Atas Awan (Denias, Humming Above The Clouds; 2006)

=== Soap operas ===
- Bunga-Bunga Kehidupan
- Antara Jakarta-Perth
- Cinta Rasa Tora Bika
- Doa Dan Cinta
- Bayangan Adinda
- Romansa 21
- Pura-Pura Buta

== Producer ==
- Denias, Senandung Di Atas Awan (Denias, Humming Above The Clouds; 2006)
- Liburan Seruuu...!! (Holiday Fuuuns; 2008)
- Serdadu Kembang (Beetles Soldiers; 2011)
- Di Timur Matahari (In The East of Sun; 2012)

== TV commercials ==
- GIV
- Lux
- Emeron
- Nivea
- Tora Bika
- So Klin
- Mama Lemon
- Ekonomi

== Discography ==
- Aku Tetap Menunggu (1985)
- Benang-benang Cinta (1985)
- Senandung Malam (1985)
- Kesepian (1986)
- Kepastian (1987)
- Satukan Hatiku (1988)
- Jangan Pisahkan Aku (1992)
- Kuingin Bersamamu (1993)
- Kanda Disini (1994)
- Hanya Padamu (1997)

Award	Year	Category	Film	Result
Indonesian Film Festival	1991	Best Leading Actress	Laguni Untuk Seruni	Nominated
