= Roosilawaty =

Indonesian actress (1936–2009)

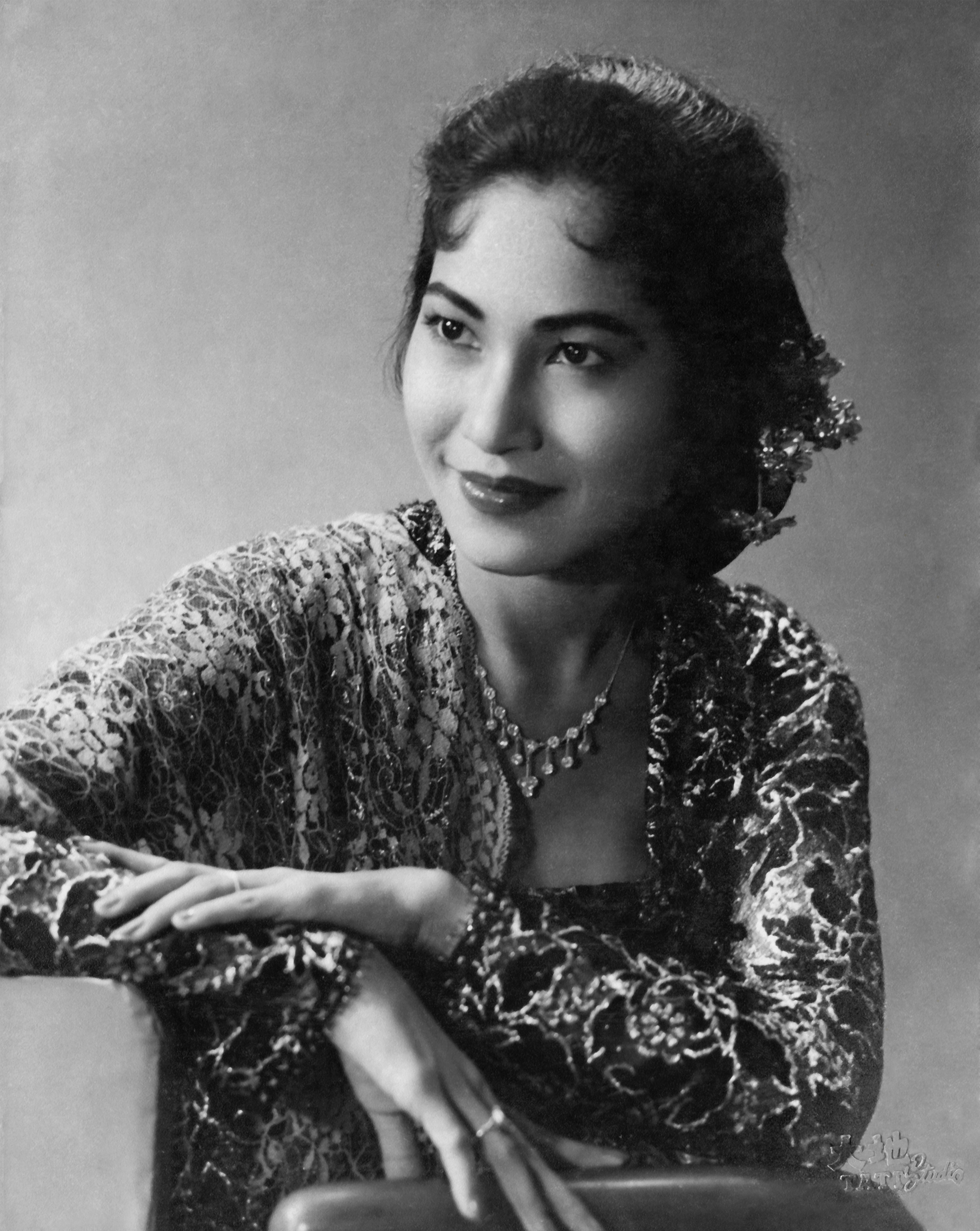
- Roosilawaty c. 1960
- Born: Surayi Pendidikan; 15 April 1936; Surakarta, Dutch East Indies
- Died: 25 February 2009 (aged 72); Jakarta, Indonesia
- Education: Indonesian National Theater Academy
- Occupations: Actress; dancer
- Years active: 1956–1963
- Children: 7

Roosilawaty (15 April 1936 – 25 February 2009) was an Indonesian actress and dancer. Born with the name Surayi Pendidikan, Roosilawaty adopted her stage name when she started her career as a singer and dancer. She starred in her first lead role in the film Tjatut in 1956 and continued to appear in Indonesian films until 1963. Among her films are Tiga Dara (Three Virgins) and Lahirnja Gatotkatja (Birth of Gatotkatja), a latter inspired by traditional Indonesian wayang. She retired from acting and, after a period as a florist, subsequently founded Les Sphinx Promotion, an agency for artistic talent, in 1972.

== Early life ==
Roosilawaty was born Surayi Pendidikan, on 15 April 1936, in Surakarta, Dutch East Indies, and was raised in a relatively affluent family. She demonstrated a talent for acting at a young age and attended the Indonesian National Theater Academy (ATNI) following her formal education at a local school. Leaving the academy before graduating, she had an initial career as a dancer, adopting the stage name Roosilawaty.

== Career ==
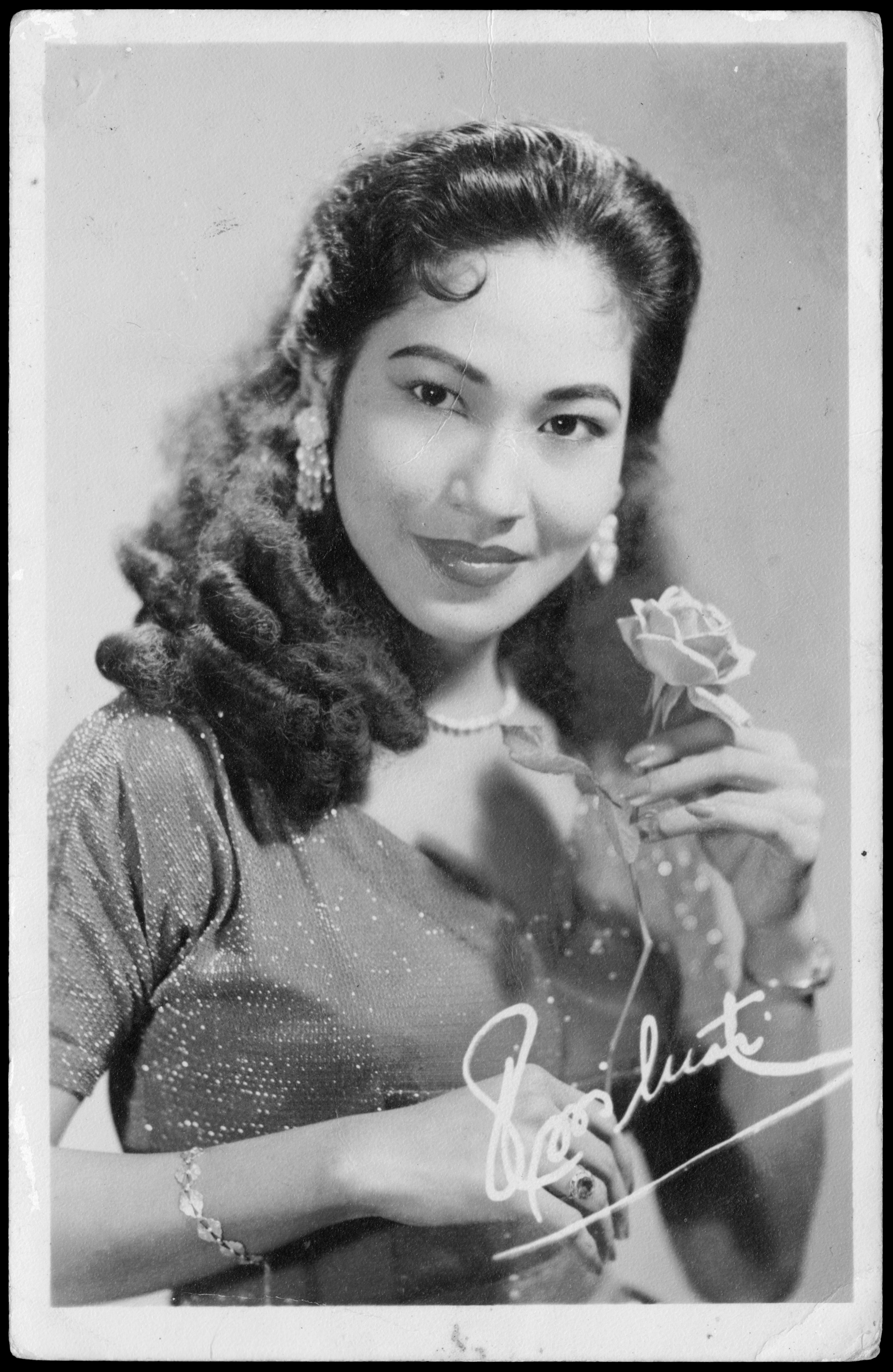
Roosilawaty at Djakartawood studio in c. 1960

After winning the Serampang Twelve dance championships, she represented Indonesia on a dance exchange with Pakistan organized by the president, Sukarno.

Soon after, she turned to acting. She appeared in her first films in 1956, in Tiga Dara (Three Virgins) as a dancer and in the lead role in Tjatut. This was the beginning of a successful career, with her next appearance a supporting role in the film Delapan Pendjuru Angin (Eight Corners of the Wind) the following year.

In 1960, she starred in Lahirnja Gatotkatja (Birth of Gatotkatja), a film inspired by traditional wayang stories directed by D. Djajakusuma. Her last film, in 1963, was titled Lembah Hidjau (Valley of Green). She retired and opened a florists in Jakarta the following year but later returned to the acting profession, setting up a talent agency named Les Sphinx Promotion in 1972. She died in Jakarta on 25 February 2009.

== Filmography ==
Roosilawaty appeared in the following films:

- Tjatut (1956)
- Tiga Dara (1956)
- Delapan Pendjuru Angin (1957)
- Konsepsi Ajah (1957)
- Bertamasja (1959)
- Lahirnja Gatotkatja (1960)
- Menudju Bintang (1960)
- Desa Yang Dilupakan (1960)
- Lembah Hidjau (1963)
