= Baby Huwae =

Indonesian actress (1939–1989)

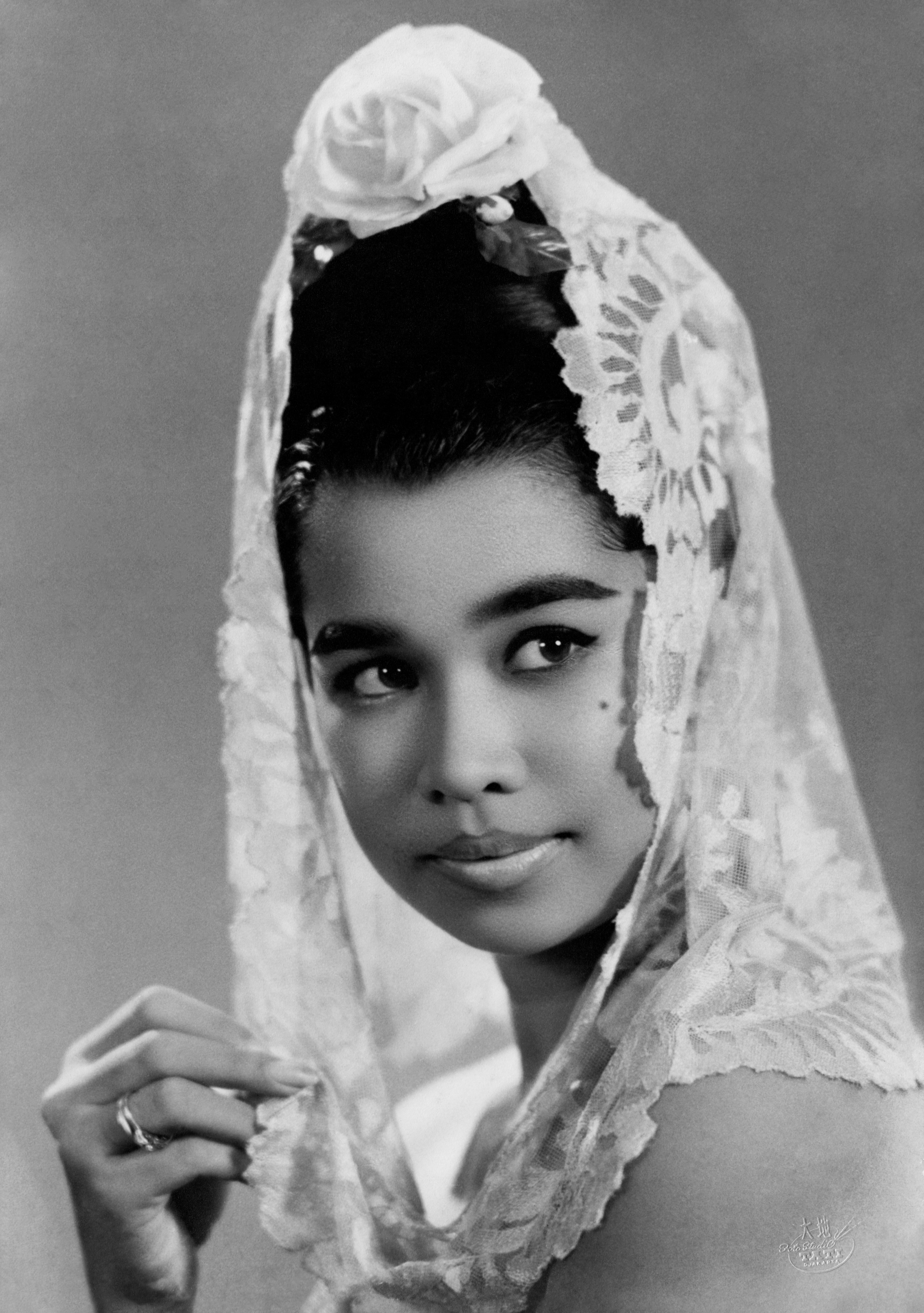
- Baby Huwae c. 1963
- Born: Baby Constance Irene Theresia Huwae; 22 November 1939; Rotterdam, the Netherlands
- Died: 5 June 1989 (aged 49); Jakarta, Indonesia
- Other name: Lokita Purnamasari
- Occupations: Actress; model; singer
- Spouse: Endang Karnadi (m. 1960; div. 1978)
- Children: 7
- Relatives: G. A. Siwabessy (uncle)

Baby Constance Irene Theresia Huwae (22 November 1939 – 5 June 1989) was a Dutch-born Indonesian actress, model, and singer. Born in Rotterdam, she had moved to Indonesia by the 1950s and taken up modelling. She entered the film industry in 1958, and gained popularity following the success of Asrama Dara (Dormitory for Girls). Over the next several years she acted in a further five films and established a girl group, the Baby Dolls. However, after she married in 1960, Huwae focused on modelling. In the 1970s she worked as a fortune teller.

== Biography ==
Huwae was born in Rotterdam, the Netherlands, on 22 November 1939. She was of mixed Indonesian (Javanese-Moluccan) and German heritage. By the late 1950s, she had taken up modelling in the Indonesian capital of Jakarta. She was drawn into film in 1958. That year, she appeared in two films. The first, Asrama Dara (Dormitory for Girls), was an Usmar Ismail-directed comedy which followed a group of young women who lived together in a dormitory. Huwae played Maria, a flight attendant caught in a love triangle with a pilot and a merchant; this became her most famous role. The second film, Djuara Sepatu Roda (Roller-Skating Champion), followed a competition between schoolmates to be crowned roller-skating champion.

With Rima Melati, Gaby Mambo, and Indriati Iskak, Huwae formed a girl group named the Baby Dolls in 1959; they had all appeared together in Djuara Sepatu Roda. That year Huwae acted in three films, Gembira Ria (Joyful), Serba Salah (Gone Awry), and Tiga Mawar (Three Roses). She also participated in tours of Singapore during this time, including holding a fashion show. She was rumored to be romantically involved with President Sukarno, though she denied these claims.

Huwae married Endang Karnadi in 1960. The two had met in 1957, at a birthday party for Indriati Iskak. After marriage she focused on modelling and reduced her acting, taking only a single role, in Amor dan Humor (Love and Humor), in 1961. This romantic comedy saw Huwae play a salesclerk who must rebuff the advances of one man whilst maintaining her relationship with her boyfriend. Huwae and Karnadi had seven children before divorcing in 1978. In the 1960s Huwae converted from Catholicism to Islam, later going on the hajj with Sukarno's wife Dewi Sukarno. In 1966 she was a witness during a sex and embezzlement scandal involving former Minister of the Central Bank Yusuf Muda Dalam; The Straits Times reported that she had been gifted a house at the order of President Sukarno.

In 1978, Berita Harian reported that Huwae had been asked by the Regent of Rembang to produce a film based on the life of Kartini, an Indonesian women's emancipation figure. Though such a film was ultimately produced in 1982, it was directed by Sjumandjaja and produced by a different company. By 1979 Huwae was using the name Lokita Purnamasari and operated a boutique. She later took up work as a fortune teller, writing several columns on the subject in Jakarta-based newspapers. She was also involved in the martial arts, serving as the head of the Indonesian Karate Do Institution.

Huwae was diagnosed with leukemia in 1986. She died in a hospital in Jakarta on 5 June 1989 and was buried in Menteng Pulo. Her funeral was attended by actors such as Rima Melati, Rina Hasyim, and Ratno Timoer, musicians such as Idris Sardi, as well as the late Sukarno's sons Guntur and Guruh.

== Filmography ==
During her first three years of acting, Huwae appeared in six films. After a lengthy hiatus, she had a guest appearance in the 1971 film Tiada Maaf Bagimu (There is No Forgiveness for You).

- Djuara Sepatu Roda (1958)
- Asrama Dara (1958)
- Gembira Ria (1959)
- Serba Salah (1959)
- Tiga Mawar (1959)
- Amor dan Humor (1961)
- Tiada Maaf Bagimu (1971)

== Works cited ==
- "Baby Huwae – Filmografi" [Baby Huwae – Filmography]. filmindonesia.or.id (in Indonesian). Jakarta: Konfiden Foundation. Archived from the original on 3 October 2016.
- "Baby Huwae dalam Kenangan" [Baby Huwae in Memoriam]. Berita Harian (in Malay). Singapore. 23 July 1989. p. 8 – via National Library of Singapore.
- Biran, Misbach Yusa, ed. (1979). Apa Siapa Orang Film Indonesia 1926–1978 [What and Who: Film Figures in Indonesia, 1926–1978]. Jakarta: Sinematek Indonesia. OCLC 6655859.
- Kristanto, JB, ed. (2007). Katalog Film Indonesia 1926 – 2007. Jakarta: Nalar. ISBN 978-979-26-9006-4.
- "Perjuangan Ibu Kartini nak Dijadikan Filem..." [Kartini's Struggle to Be Filmed]. Berita Harian (in Malay). Singapore. 3 December 1978. p. 7 – via National Library of Singapore.
- "She Spends Week Here to Shop for Fashion Show". The Singapore Free Press. Singapore. 1 June 1961. p. 7 – via National Library of Singapore.
- "Witness: My Job to get Girls for Bank Chief". The Straits Times. Singapore. 3 September 1966. p. 1 – via National Library of Singapore.
