= Muhammad Alwi Dahlan =

Indonesian writer and politician (1933–2024)

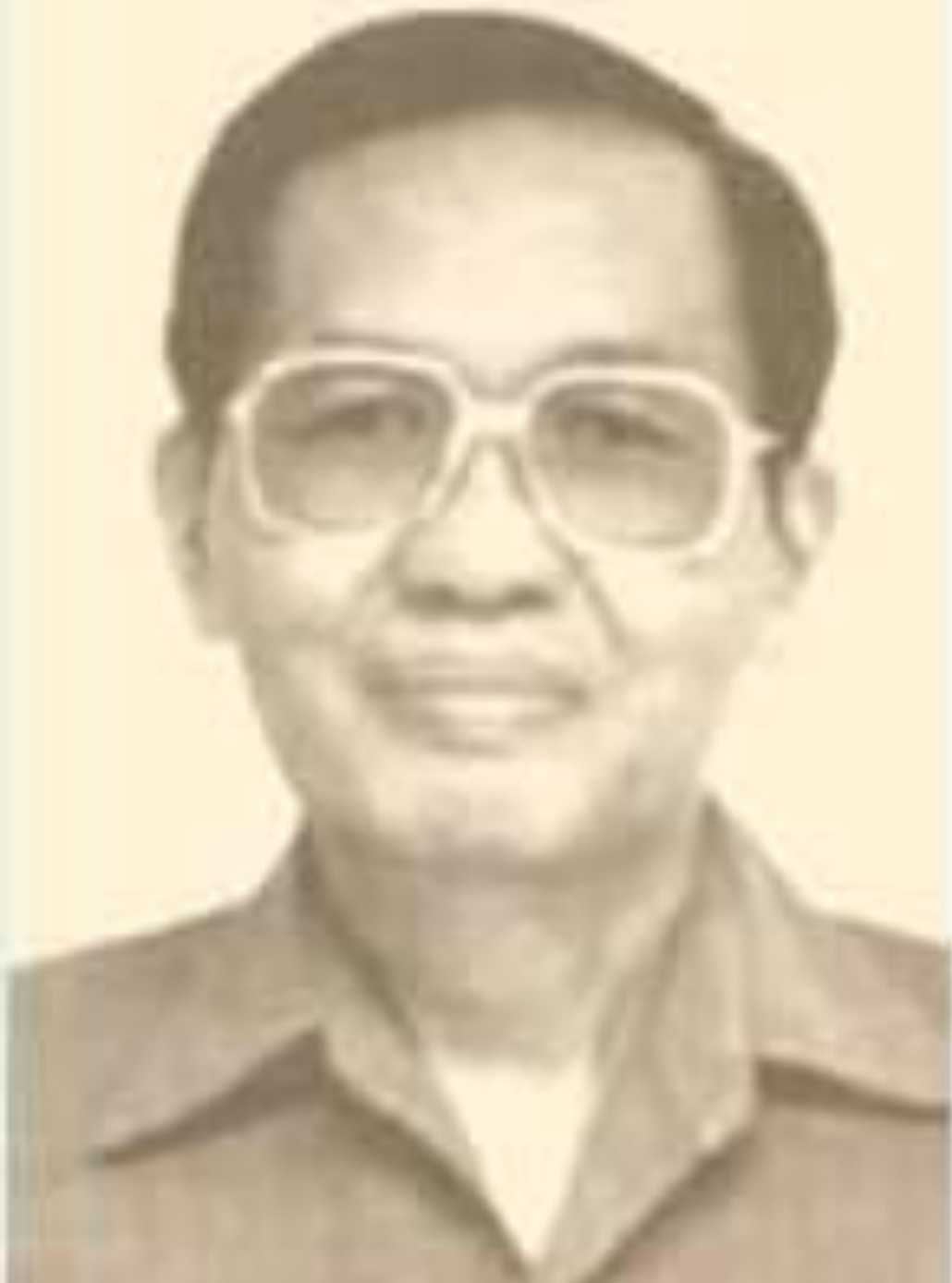
- Dahlan in 1998

Minister of Information
- In office 16 March 1998 – 21 May 1998
- Preceded by: R. Hartono
- Succeeded by: Yunus Yosfiah

Personal details
- Born: 15 May 1933 Padang, Dutch East Indies
- Died: 20 March 2024 (aged 90) Jakarta, Indonesia
- Education: American University (BA); Stanford University (MA); University of Illinois Urbana-Champaign (PhD)
- Occupation: Writer

Muhammad Alwi Dahlan (15 May 1933 – 20 March 2024) was an Indonesian writer and politician. He served as Minister of Information from March to May 1998.

Dahlan died in Jakarta on 20 March 2024, at the age of 90.
