= Sisworo Gautama Putra =

Sisworo Gautama Putra (May 26, 1938 – January 5, 1993) was an Indonesian film director and screenwriter, best known for his work in the horror film genre.

== Biography ==
Born in Kisaran in North Sumatra, Sisworo trained as a director in 1961. In 1962 he began working in the studio Gema Period Film. He worked as screenwriter unit manager, production manager and then assistant director.

His solo debut as a director started in 1972 with the film Revenge of the Child Haram, in which the screenplay was also written by him. He was a successful director during the golden age of Indonesian cinema from the 1970s until the early 1990s and often directed popular horror films such as Sundelbolong, Telaga Angker, and Nyi Ageng Ratu Pemika, often working actors such as Suzzanna, Ratno Timoer, Barry Prima, and George Rudy.

His last film, Misteri di Malam Pengantin, was released after his death on January 5, 1993.

== Filmography ==
- 1962 – Tudjuh Prajurit
- 1963 – Djakarta by Pass
- 1964 – Ekspedisi Terakhir
- 1965 – Buruh Pelabuhan
- 1970 – Honey, Money and Djakarta Fair
- 1971 – Di Udjung Badik
- 1972 – Angkara Murka and Dendam si Anak Haram
- 1973 – Marabunta and Manusia Terakhir
- 1976 – Rajawali Sakti and Cinta Kasih Mama
- 1977 – Papa and Dua Pendekar Pembelah Langit
- 1978 – Primitif
- 1980 – Aladin dan Lampu Wasiat and Pengabdi Setan
- 1981 – Jaka Sembung Sang Penakluk, Srigala and Sundelbolong
- 1982 – Nyi Blorong
- 1983 – Nyi Ageng Ratu Pemikat and Perkawinan Nyi Blorong
- 1984 – Usia Dalam Gejolak and Telaga Angker
- 1985 – Bangunnya Nyi Roro Kidul and Ratu Sakti Calon Arang
- 1986 – Malam Jumat Kliwon and Petualangan Cinta Nyi Blorong
- 1987 – Samson dan Delilah
- 1988 – Malam Satu Suro, Malu-Malu Mau and Santet
- 1989 – Wanita Harimau / Santet II and Pusaka Penyebar Maut
- 1990 – Titisan Dewi Ular
- 1991 – Perjanjian di Malam Keramat and Ajian Ratu Laut Kidul
- 1992 – Kembalinya si Janda Kembang
- 1993 – Misteri di Malam Pengantin
