= Mieke Wijaya =

Indonesian actress and model (1940–2022)

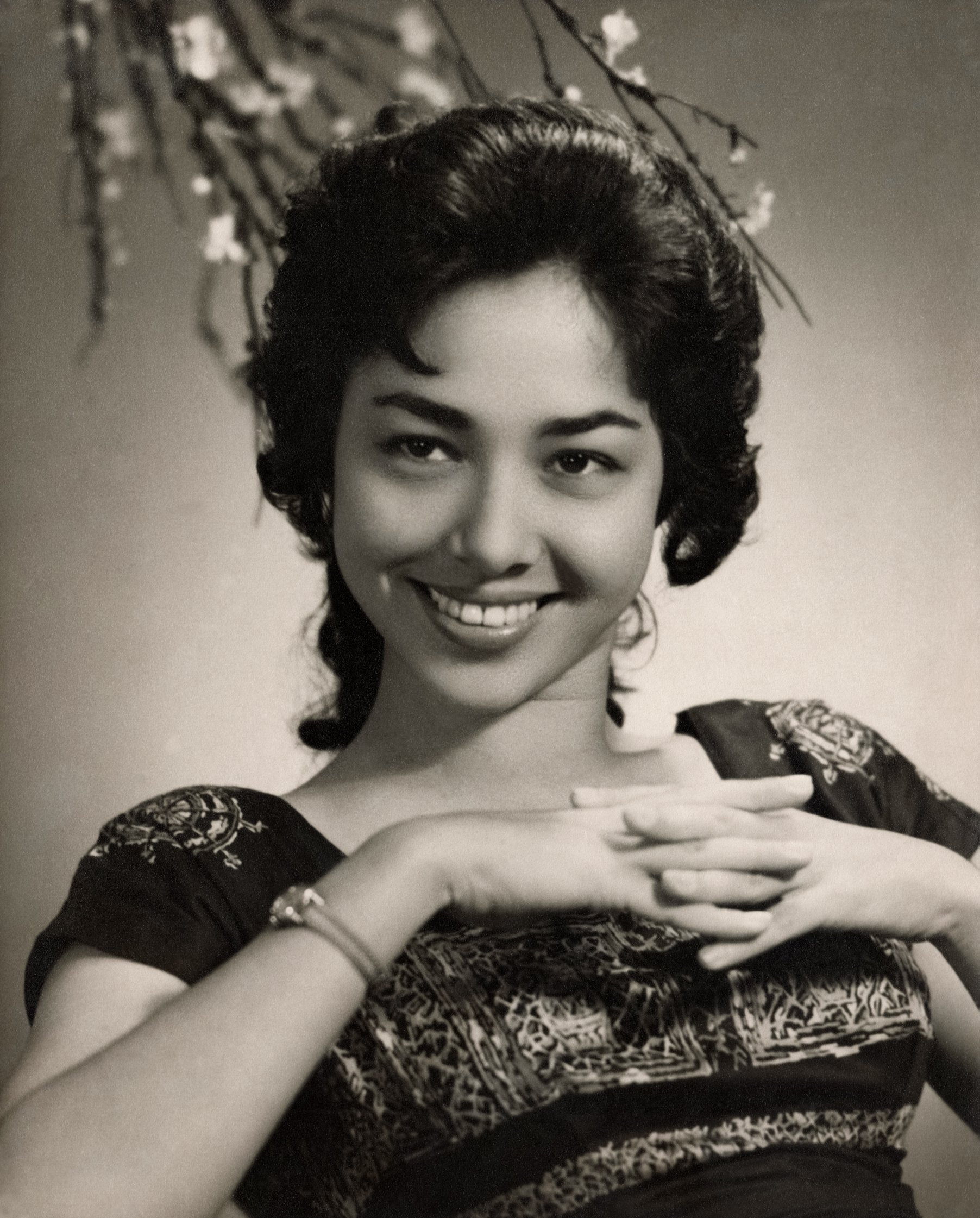
- Wijaya in c. 1960
- Born: Miecke Marie de Rijder; 17 March 1940; Bandung, Dutch East Indies
- Died: 3 May 2022 (aged 82); Jakarta, Indonesia
- Resting place: Tanah Kusir Cemetery, Kebayoran Lama, Jakarta
- Occupations: Actress; model
- Spouse: Dicky Zulkarnaen (m. 1963; died 1995)
- Children: 4, including Nia Zulkarnaen

Miecke Marie de Rijder (née Widjaja; 17 March 1940 – 3 May 2022) was an Indonesian actress and model who won three Citra Awards. She was crowned the best female antagonist in Indonesian film industry along with Suzzanna and Ruth Pelupessy. Wijaya began her career as a teenager and soared to popularity by partaking a role in Usmar Ismail's commercially successful Tiga Dara, her name became increasingly popular after starring in the soap opera Losmen in 1987.

== Biography ==
Mieke Wijaya was born Miecke Marie de Rijder on 17 March 1940, in Bandung, Dutch East Indies to the De Rijder family, and she was thus of Dutch-Indonesian descent. After graduating senior high school, she studied for some time at the National Theatre Academy of Indonesia in Jakarta. During this period she was active as a singer and actress; she had made her film debut in 1954 with Gagal.

In 1956 Wijaya rose to fame as one of the stars in Perfini's Tiga Dara. The film, directed by Usmar Ismail, saw Mieke play Nana, one of three sisters raised by their grandmother after their mother's death; in 2006 Ade Irwansyah of Tabloid Bintang wrote that Tiga Dara was the eleventh best Indonesian film of all time. Over the next five years she acted in thirteen films, including five in 1961 alone. Through the 1960s, while continuing to act in films, she was a member of Teguh Karya's Teater Populer (English: Popular Theatre), a stage drama troupe.

Through the 1970s and 1980s Wijaya acted in numerous films, including the religious Sembilan Wali (1985), the comedy Bing Slamet Koboi Cengeng (1974), the drama Ranjang Pengantin (1973), and the romances Badai Pasti Berlalu (1977) and Dr. Karmila (1977). In 1987 she acted in three productions.

After a four-year hiatus, during 1991 Wijaya acted in two films, Saat Kukatakan Cinta and Zig Zag (Anak Jalanan). This was followed by another long hiatus from featured films: the Indonesian film industry declined drastically in the early 1990s, and Wijaya began to focus on television series, including Melangkah Di Atas Awan. As of 2013, her most recent feature film role was in Hanung Bramantyo's Ayat-Ayat Cinta.

Wijaya won two Citra Awards for Best Leading Actress, one in 1967 for Gadis Kerudung Putih and one in 1981 for Kembang Semusim. She also received a Citra Award for Best Supporting Actress in 1975 for her role in Ranjang Pengantin. In 1996 she received a Surjosoemanto Prize from the National Film Board in recognition of her lengthy career, and at the 2011 Bandung Film Festival she received a Lifetime Achievement award together with Deddy Mizwar.

She was married to fellow actor Dicky Zulkarnaen until his death from a stroke. They had four children: Tirza Valentina (born 1964), Ade Miskarana (born 1967), Nia (born 1970), and Barman Morgana Zulkarnaen (born 1975). The couple's daughter Nia was nominated for a Citra Award in 1991 for her role in Lagu Untuk Seruni.

Wijaya died at her residence in Kemang, South Jakarta, on 3 May 2022. Wijaya was suffered from diabetes and later discovered cancer after being hospitalized for a month in Gatot Soebroto Army Hospital at the age of 82. Her funeral was held at Tanah Kusir Cemetery, Kebayoran Lama, on 4 May 2022.

== Filmography ==
Wijaya acted in over seventy films during her fifty-year career.

- Gagal (1955)
- Tjorak Dunia (1955)
- Pilihlah Aku (1956)
- Tiga Dara (1956)
- Dekat Dimata Djauh Dihati (1956)
- Dewi (1957)
- Delapan Pendjuru Angin (1957)
- Sengketa (1957)
- Bing Slamet Tukang Betja (1959)
- Iseng (1959)
- Sekedjap Mata (1959)
- Gadis Diseberang Djalan (1960)
- Piso Surit (1960)
- Detik-detik Berbahaja (1961)
- Aksi Kalimantan (1961)
- Masih Ada Hari Esok (1961)
- Mira (1961)
- Toha, Pahlawan Bandung Selatan (1961)
- Anak-anak Revolusi (1964)
- Ekspedisi Terakhir (1964)
- Impian Bukit Harapan (1964)
- Langkah-langkah Dipersimpangan (1965)
- Liburan Seniman (1965)
- Gita Taruna (1966)
- Disela-sela Kelapa Sawit (1967)
- Gadis Kerudung Putih (1967)
- Big Village (1969)
- Tokoh (1973)
- Ananda (1970)
- Beranak dalam Kubur (1971)
- Dunia Belum Kiamat (1971)
- Malam Jahanam (1971)
- Spy and Journalist (1971)
- Akhir Cinta di Atas Bukit (1972)
- Lingkaran Setan (1972)
- Romusha (1972)
- Desa di Kaki Bukit (1972)
- Dosa Siapa (1972)
- Flamboyant (1972)
- Dimana Kau Ibu (1973)
- Ita Si Anak Pungut (1973)
- Bing Slamet Koboi Cengeng (1974)
- Demi Cinta (1974)
- Kehormatan (1974)
- Sayangilah Daku (1974)
- Boni dan Nancy (1974)
- Ranjang Pengantin (1974)
- Kawin Lari (1974)
- Perkawinan dalam Semusim (1976)
- Badai Pasti Berlalu (1977)
- Selimut Cinta (1977)
- Diana (1977)
- Ali Topan Anak Jalanan (1977)
- Napsu Serakah (1977)
- Manager Hotel (1977)
- Jaringan Antar Benua (1978)
- Senja di Pulo Putih (1978)
- Kembang Semusim (1980)
- Srigala (1981)
- Ketika Cinta Harus Memilih (1981)
- Nila di Gaun Putih (1981)
- Remang-remang Jakarta (1981)
- Dr. Karmila (1981)
- Betapa Damai Hati Kami (1981)
- Hukum Karma (1982)
- Pengabdian (1984)
- Kontraktor (1984)
- Sembilan Wali (1985)
- Gadis Hitam Putih (1985)
- Gerhana (1985)
- Beri Aku Waktu (1986)
- Pernikahan Dini (1987)
- Penginapan Bu Broto (1987)
- Luka di Atas Luka (1987)
- Saat Kukatakan Cinta (1991)
- Zig Zag (Anak Jalanan) (1991)
- Ayat-Ayat Cinta (2008)

== Awards and nominations ==
Award	Year	Category	Work	Result
Indonesian Film Festival	1967	Citra Award for Best Leading Actress	Gadis Kerudung Putih	Won
Indonesian Film Festival	1975	Citra Award for Best Supporting Actress	Ranjang Pengantin	Won
Indonesian Film Festival	1981	Citra Award for Best Leading Actress	Kembang Semusim	Won
Bandung Film Festival	2011	Lifetime Achievement Award		Won
Indonesian Movie Awards	2015	Lifetime Achievement Award		Won
Asian Television Awards	1996	Best Actress in a Supporting Role	Antara Jakarta dan Perth	Won

== Works cited ==
- Irwansyah, Ade (23 April 2010). "25 film Indonesia Terbaik Sepanjang Masa" [25 Best Indonesian Movies of All Time]. Tabloid Bintang (in Indonesian). Archived from the original on 13 June 2012.
- "Jangan Hanya di Gedung" [Don't Just Stay in Warehouses]. Kompas (in Indonesian). 14 May 2011.
- "Filmografi Mieke Wijaya" [Filmography for Mieke Wijaya]. filmindonesia.or.id (in Indonesian). Konfiden Foundation. Archived from the original on 6 March 2016.
- "Mieke Wijaya". filmindonesia.or.id (in Indonesian). Konfiden Foundation. Archived from the original on 18 July 2014.
- "Nia Zulkarnaen". filmindonesia.or.id (in Indonesian). Konfiden Foundation. Archived from the original on 5 April 2015.
- "Penghargaan Mieke Wijaya" [Awards for Mieke Wijaya]. filmindonesia.or.id (in Indonesian). Konfiden Foundation. Archived from the original on 15 April 2017.
- "Smoke, but little fire, to draft bill". The Jakarta Post. 25 August 1999. Archived from the original on 5 March 2016.
- "Tiga Dara". filmindonesia.or.id (in Indonesian). Konfiden Foundation. Archived from the original on 15 April 2017.
