= Si Doel the Series =

Indonesian family drama television series

- Genre: Family drama; Comedy drama
- Created by: Frederica
- Based on: Si Doel Anak Betawi by Aman Datuk Madjoindo
- Screenplay by: Rano Karno
- Directed by: Rano Karno
- Starring: Rano Karno; Cornelia Agatha; Maudy Koesnaedi; Aminah Cendrakasih; Mandra; Rey Bong; Zayyan Sakha
- Theme music composer: Sjumandjaja
- Opening theme: "Si Doel Anak Betawi" by ME Voices
- Ending theme: "Si Doel Anak Betawi" by Armada
- Country of origin: Indonesia
- Original languages: Indonesian; Betawi
- No. of seasons: 1
- No. of episodes: 16

Production
- Executive producers: Rano Karno; HB Naveen; Dallas Sinaga
- Producer: Frederica
- Camera setup: Multi-camera
- Running time: 25-30 minutes
- Production companies: Falcon Pictures; Karnos Film

Original release
- Network: RCTI
- Release: 27 December 2022 – 19 January 2023

Related
- Si Doel Anak Sekolahan; Si Doel Anak Gedongan; Si Doel Anak Pinggiran; Si Doel the Movie; Si Doel the Movie 2; Akhir Kisah Cinta Si Doel

Si Doel the Series is an Indonesian television series produced by Falcon Pictures and Karnos Film which aired from 27 December 2022 to 19 January 2023 on RCTI. It based on the novel Si Doel Anak Betawi by Aman Datuk Madjoindo. The series stars Rano Karno, Cornelia Agatha and Maudy Koesnaedi.

This series also marked the final appearance of Aminah Tjendrakasih and Salman Alfarizi on TV. Aminah died in 2022, while Salman died in 2023.

== Plot ==
Doel and Zaenab are married and live together in Doel's house with Nyak, Mandra, Atun, and their son, Kartubi.

Doel and Sarah's son, Dul, has grown up and visits Doel at home. Furthermore, Sarah has reportedly returned to Indonesia. This has strained Doel and Zaenab's marriage.

Like his father, Dul also has a complicated love story with a woman named Tari.

== Cast ==
- Rano Karno as Doel
- Cornelia Agatha as Sarah
- Maudy Koesnaedi as Zaenab
- Mandra as Mandra
- Suti Karno as Atun
- Maryati Tohir as Munaroh
- Tonah as Ipah
- Ratih Dewi as Marini
- Rey Bong as Abdullah / Dul
- Mamat Alkatiri as Mamat
- Rinoa Senduk as Yalova
- Nabila Bintang as Tari
- Aqueena Djorghi as Amel
- Ahmad Zulhoir as Abi Kartubi
- Adam Jagwani as Hans
- Aminah Cendrakasih as Mak Nyak
- Salman Alfarizi as Ahong
- Zayyan Sakha as Rindra
- Indro as Indro
- Sabar bin Bokir as Sabar

== Production ==
=== Development ===
In January 2026, Rano Karno, the creator and producer of Si Doel, made the television series "Si Doel Anak Millenial" but it was stopped due to the COVID-19 pandemic. In December 2022, Rano Karno also said that the "Si Doel" series would be broadcast on overseas OTTs instead of Indonesian TV.

=== Release ===
Previously, this series was titled "Si Doel Anak Millenial," but it release on 27 December 2022, titled "Si Doel the Series".
