= Si Doel Anak Sekolahan =

Indonesian television series

- Title card for the first five seasons
- Genre: Drama; Comedy
- Created by: Rano Karno
- Based on: Si Doel Anak Betawi by Aman Datuk Madjoindo
- Written by: Rano Karno
- Directed by: Rano Karno
- Starring: Rano Karno; Benyamin Sueb; Cornelia Agatha; Maudy Koesnaedi; Aminah Cendrakasih; Mandra; Suti Karno; Basuki
- Theme music composer: Sjuman Tiasa
- Opening theme: "Si Doel Anak Betawi" performed by ME Voices
- Ending theme: "Si Doel Anak Betawi" performed by ME Voices
- Composer: Purwacaraka
- Country of origin: Indonesia
- Original language: Indonesian
- No. of seasons: 6
- No. of episodes: 139

Production
- Producer: Rano Karno
- Production location: Jakarta
- Running time: 40 minutes
- Production company: Karnos Film

Original release
- Network: RCTI (seasons 1–4 and 6); Indosiar (season 5)
- Release: 16 January 1994 – 10 May 2003

Related
- Si Doel Anak Gedongan; Si Doel Anak Pinggiran; Si Doel the Movie; Si Doel the Movie 2; Akhir Kisah Cinta Si Doel; Si Doel the Series

Si Doel Anak Sekolahan (literally translated as The Educated Doel) is an Indonesian television series produced, written and directed by Rano Karno who also stars as Doel/Kasdullah. This series depicts the life of Doel and his family, rooted in Betawi culture, and highlights their traditional way of life amidst the modernization of urban Jakarta. Besides Rano Karno, the series also stars Benyamin Sueb, Maudy Koesnaedi, Cornelia Agatha, Aminah Cendrakasih, Mandra, Suti Karno and Basuki.

Consisting of 6 seasons and 139 episodes, the storyline is loosely based from the novel Si Doel Anak Betawi by Aman Datuk Majoindo and the film with same title directed by Sjumandjaja in 1972. In the film version, Rano Karno also plays Si Doel and Benyamin Sueb plays the role of as Doel's father. The difference is, Doel's father's name is Asman, not Sabeni like in this series.

When it first aired in 1994, the Si Doel series immediately became a favorite TV show among Indonesians, surpassing foreign serials that were widely broadcast by several Indonesian television stations at the time. The success of Si Doel Anak Sekolahan led Rano Karno to further develop this story in other versions, including Si Doel Anak Gedongan, the television movie Si Doel Anak Pinggiran, and three cinema films (Si Doel the Movie, Si Doel the Movie 2, Akhir Kisah Cinta Si Doel). However, of all these, only the cinema films achieved notable success. Along with Keluarga Cemara and Lorong Waktu, Si Doel Anak Sekolahan is often regarded as one of the greatest Indonesian television series.

== Plot ==
Kasdullah, commonly known as Doel, is a native Betawi boy who strives to uphold the noble values of his family in modern-day Jakarta. His parents have always encouraged him to work for a reputable company, unlike his father, Sabeni, who works as an oplet driver.

In the second season, Doel faces the challenge of finding a job after graduating from college. He secures employment at several companies but is later forbidden by his father from working outside of Java. However, Doel remains determined, especially after developing a close bond with Sarah, an Indonesian-Dutch girl who has feelings for him. Additionally, Doel finds himself entangled in a complicated situation with Zainab, his childhood friend to whom he was supposedly engaged. The season concludes with Sarah inviting Doel and his family for a vacation in Anyer.

The third season brings tragedy as Sabeni passes away in an accident during their return from Anyer. Doel's burden grows heavier, particularly because he remains unemployed. Moreover, the dynamics between Doel, Sarah, and Zainab become more complex, resulting in conflicts among the trio. Towards the end of the season, Doel finally secures the job he desired but is faced with new challenges. He is required to travel to France and Switzerland to learn new machining systems. Fueled by Sarah's love and Mak Nyak's blessings, Doel embarks on this task.

In the fourth season, after returning from Zurich, Switzerland, Doel finds himself waiting for a new assignment from his company. In the meantime, he resumes driving the old oplet left by his father. However, tensions arise in Doel and Sarah's relationship due to Doel's secretive gift-giving to Zainab.

The fifth season is marked by the passing of Engkong Ali, which brings sadness to the Doel family. Amidst the sorrow, there is good news as Atun is soon to marry Karyo. Additionally, Doel receives a long-term assignment from his office, requiring him to travel to Kalimantan. Sarah, who genuinely loves Doel, requests permission to accompany him and asks him to marry her.

The sixth season delves into Doel's life as an office employee. His deployment to Kalimantan is temporarily postponed. Meanwhile, he continues to struggle with choosing between Sarah and Zainab. Eventually, Zainab marries a man named Henry. In the final episode, Doel finally marries Sarah.

== Cast ==
=== Main ===
- Rano Karno as Kasdullah, often called as Doel. An engineering student who helps his parents by driving oplet in his spare time. He then graduated with a bachelor's degree and worked in a heavy equipment company in Jakarta.
- Benyamin Sueb as Sabeni, often called as Babe (Doel's father), previously owned a large plot of land in Jakarta, which was still vacant, before being gradually sold for living expenses. However, he still keeps some of the money from the sale of his land for Doel's tuition fees. He died in an accident on his way home from a holiday in Anyer. (Note: In reality, Benyamin died of a heart attack after playing football in September 1995. Even though there was a suggestion for Rano Karno to replace the Sabeni actor with someone with a similar face, Rano chose not to do it for reasons of respecting Benyamin's legacy. Finally, Rano then rewrote the scenario by telling that Sabeni died in an accident.)
- Aminah Cendrakasih as Laila, often called as Mpok Lela or Mak Nyak (Doel's mother). She owns a small shop at her home run by herself and her daughter, Atun. After the death of her husband, she depended on her living income from oplet, home boarding business, Doel's income as an office employee and her shop business.
- Cornelia Agatha as Sarah van Heus. A girl of Indonesian-Dutch descent. At first, she was a student who was writing a thesis and then made the Doel family the object of her research. Later she has a crush on Doel and competes with Zainab who is Doel's childhood friend. She then married Doel at the end of the sixth season.
- Maudy Koesnaedi as Zainab. Doel's childhood friend that was brought up from the second season. She is a simple girl. Has a crush on Doel even though his parents have arranged a marriage with Ahong, a businessman of Chinese descent. She later married Henry at the end of season six.
- Mandra as Himself (Uncle of Doel). An illiterate and unemployed man who was later asked by Mak Nyak to continue her late husband's duties as an oplet driver.
- Suti Karno as Atun Zaitun (Doel's sister). Her formal education was discontinued due to financial constraints. She then helped his mother sell in the shop and had time to also open a salon business.
- Basuki as Karyo "Buluk". A Javanese man who rents a house owned by Sabeni. Has a crush on Atun. Often nicknamed "Buluk" by Sabeni and also often noisy with Mandra. But lately he and Mandra have helped each other in managing the oplet car that was left by Sabeni.

=== Recurring ===
- Pak Tile as Muhammad Ali (Doel's grandfather). A rich man who loves Doel more than his own son, Mandra.
- Bendot as Himself (Karyo's father-in-law). Although Karyo is divorced from his wife, he prefers to follow Karyo to live in Jakarta before returning to his hometown.
- Nunung as Herself (Karyo's sister). Has a crush on Mandra, even though Karyo doesn't like it, who tries to keep her from meeting him
- Tubagus Maulana Husni as Rohim (Zainab's stepfather), who owns a brick company.
- Tonah as Saipah, often called as Ipah or Ipeh (Zainab's stepmother), doesn't like Doel. Prefers Zainab to be married to a rich person, rather than seeing her with Doel who she considers arrogant and pretentious
- Maryati Tohir as Munaroh (Mandra's girlfriend) but later married a man named Cecep.
- Salman Alfarizi as Ahong. A rich Chinese-Indonesian man who became Rohim's business partner. Had an arranged marriage with Zainab before finally being heartbroken because Zainab married another man.
- Djoni Irawan as Roy. Doel's rival in fighting over Sarah's heart. (Note: As a professional lawyer in reality, Djoni is also a legal advisor to Rano Karno and the Karnos Film team.)
- Ami Prijono as William (Sarah's father)
- Ratih Dewi as Marini (Sarah's mother)
- Adam "Stardust" Jagwani as Hans (Sarah's cousin). Only appeared in the first season before going home and settling in the Netherlands. (Note: In reality, Adam Jagwani is Malaysian actor. He was deported by the Indonesian government which made Rano Karno rewrite the storyline by being told that he returned to the Netherlands after graduating from college.)

== Production ==
Rano Karno revealed that the plot of Si Doel Anak Sekolahan was only slightly taken from the novel Si Doel Anak Betawi written by Aman Datuk Madjoindo. Unlike in the film version in the 1970s, Rano admitted that he did not agree if his series were fully adapted from novels because he saw that times had changed and Doel in the novel version only graduated from elementary school. That's why in the series version he tells the more modern Si Doel by being described as a college graduate.

There were three actors who were illiterate during production: Bendot, Pak Tile and Nacih. To get around these obstacles, said Rano, he gave directions verbally and directly to the three players. However, Rano added, the three of them were able to absorb the scenario well. In fact, it can provide acting improvisation beyond expectations.

Oplet, based on the Morris Minor 1000, became iconic in the Si Doel series. According to Rano, he found the oplet from someone in the Kramat Jati area, East Jakarta. Previously the oplet was being used as a chicken coop. Rano would buy it for 525,000 rupiah in 1993. He later repaired the oplet; although it still retains some of the original elements in the engine. After the filming of the Si Doel series ended, Rano would then restore the oplet by replacing the engine with a Mini Cooper engine. The interior was also replaced with teak wood chairs.

== Broadcast ==
Si Doel first aired on 16 January 1994 on RCTI. For the first season, it was mini-series with total six episodes. The success of the premiere season then made Rano Karno resume production for the second season which premiered on 14 October 1994. The third season, which premiered in 1996, became the longest season with 48 episodes. While the fourth season which aired in 1998 became the shortest season with 16 episodes.

Since the fifth season in 2000, the broadcast has shifted from RCTI to Indosiar. In the sixth season (2003), the image format of Si Doel was changed to 16:9 aspect ratio, although for television broadcasts itself, letterboxing was carried out to a 4:3 aspect ratio.

Since 25 August 2006, Si Doel was re-aired on RCTI from the first to the fourth season and then jumped to the sixth season due to copyright issues for the fifth season with Indosiar. Currently, in addition to conventional television, this series is also broadcast online through the RCTI+ application.

== Further development ==
=== Si Doel Anak Gedongan (2006) ===
After Si Doel 6 which was released in 2003, Rano Karno had chosen not to continue Si Doel. But because of the enthusiasm of fans, Rano melted and continued Si Doel's story with the title Si Doel Anak Gedongan (The Corporate Doel). Still continuing the plot after Si Doel 6, in Si Doel Anak Gedongan it was told that Doel has become a rich man with an established position in his company. Meanwhile, Mak Nyak lives with Mandra, who opens a homerental business with an inheritance from Nyak Rodiah. Atun and Mas Karyo are also happy because Atun is pregnant. Problems arise when Sarah is pregnant and Zainab is having problems with her husband. When Sarah was in need of Doel, Doel was even more concerned with Zainab who was sad because her husband had neglected her. Sarah was finally sad and chose to return to the Netherlands after learning that Doel helped Zainab who had a miscarriage. This storyline was then continued in a television film titled Si Doel Anak Pinggiran in 2011.

=== Si Doel Anak Pinggiran (2011) ===
In Si Doel Anak Pinggiran, it is explained that Doel lost his job and was even expelled by his mother-in-law because of Sarah's flight to the Netherlands, who for almost six years did not want to return to Jakarta. Now Doel's life is back to square one. He returned to the house left by his father with Mak Nyak who was sick. Atun was just left by Mas Karyo who died. Henry, Zainab's husband, chooses a divorce and on the advice of Mak Nyak, Doel marries Zainab. After marrying Zaenab, Doel was contacted by Sarah's mother to come to her house. There, Doel was met with a child he had helped while on the beach. It was there that Doel was informed that the child was his son named Abdullah/Dul.

This storyline was later developed again in the Si Doel film trilogy which was released in 2018.

=== Si Doel's trilogy ===
The Doel film trilogy was first released in 2018 under the title Si Doel the Movie. In this film, Si Doel finally meets Sarah again in the Netherlands.

In the second film titled Si Doel the Movie 2, which was released in 2019, it focused more on the figure of Zainab who was sad and unsure whether to let Doel go back to Sarah or stay with him no matter what happened.

Meanwhile, in the third film entitled Akhir Kisah Cinta Si Doel, it is told that Sarah finally chose to divorce Doel after meeting and discussing with Zainab, who was known to be pregnant. Abdullah or Doel Jr. chose to live in Jakarta when his mother chose to return to the Netherlands.
