= Basuki =

Basuki is a personal name meaning "the safe person" in Javanese.

Basuki may refer to:

- Basuki (comedian) (1956–2007), Indonesian actor and comedian
- Basuki Abdullah (1915–1993), Indonesian artist and painter
- Basuki Rahmat (1921–1969), Minister of Home Affairs of Indonesia (1966–1969)
- Basuki Tjahaja Purnama (born 1966), former Governor of DKI Jakarta (2014–2017) and Deputy Governor of DKI Jakarta (2012–2014)
- Basuki Hadimuljono (born 1954), Indonesian Ministers of Public Works and Public Housing (2014–2019)
- Basuki Bihari, village in Bihar, India

== See also ==
- Vasuki (disambiguation)
