= A. Hamid Arief =

Indonesian actor (1924–1992)

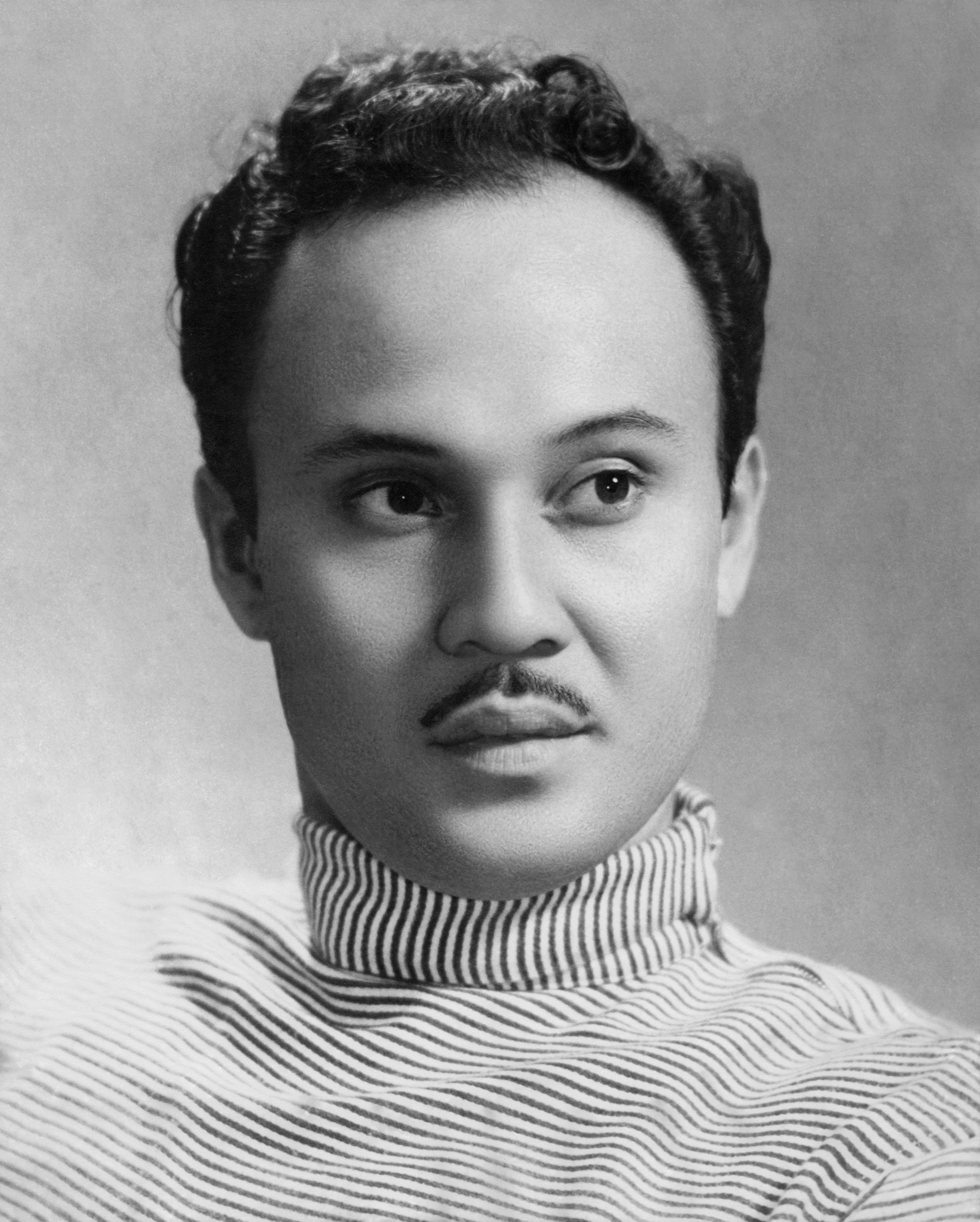
- A. Hamid Arief, c. 1960
- Born: Abdul Hamid Arief; 25 November 1924; Batavia, Dutch East Indies
- Died: 20 December 1992 (aged 68); Jakarta, Indonesia
- Occupation: Actor

Abdul Hamid Arief (25 November 1924 – 20 December 1992) was an Indonesian actor who appeared in more than 120 films. Born in Batavia, Dutch East Indies, he started his acting career in theatre before migrating to film with 1948's Anggrek Bulan (Moon Orchid). His first starring role, and the one from which he first gained recognition, was as the title character in Pangeran Hamid (Prince Hamid, 1953). Over subsequent decades he was a productive film actor, often appearing in four or five films a year. He also acted in various television series.

== Biography ==
Arief was born in Batavia, Dutch East Indies, on 25 November 1924. He completed his education up to junior high school level. He began his acting career with Djamaluddin Malik's travelling troupe at Pantjawarna, later migrating to Bintang Surabaja which was a travelling theatre troupe headed by Fred Young. By 1948 he had reached Batavia, which was renamed Jakarta during the Japanese occupation of the Dutch East Indies (1942–1945), and had been cast in the South Pacific Film Corporation's Anggrek Bulan (Moon Orchid, 1948). In this film, directed by Andjar Asmara, Arief played a young man who must be protected from the predations of the "moon orchid", a beautiful yet dangerous young woman.

In 1949, Arief acted in four more films for the South Pacific Film Corporation, including Usmar Ismail's debut film Tjitra (Image). Soon afterwards he migrated to Fred Young's film company, also named Bintang Surabaja. Arief appeared in numerous films for the company, including Bintang Surabaja 1951 (Star of Surabaya 1951, 1950) and Selamat Berdjuang, Masku! (Fight Well, My Brother!, 1951). He also acted in films by the National Film Company (Inspektur Rachman, 1950) and Djamaluddin Malik's Persari. His star-making role, however, came with Pangeran Hamid (Prince Hamid, 1953), produced by Chok Chin Hsien's Golden Arrow Productions. In this film, he played a young prince named Hamid who retakes the throne after being driven out by a usurper.

After his contract with Golden Arrow ended in 1955, Arief became a free agent. He remained highly productive and acted for numerous companies, despite the slump the filmmaking industry underwent in the early 1969s. Beginning with 1965's Matjan Kemajoran (Tiger of Kemajoran), Arief took on a number of roles as characters of European descent. Later roles of this type included the Englishman Edward William in Samiun dan Dasima (Samiun and Dasima, 1970) and the villainous Dutch colonial policeman Heyne Scott in the Si Pitung series, consisting of Si Pitung (1970), Banteng Betawi (Bull of Betawi, 1971), Pembalasan si Pitung (Revenge of Si Pitung, 1977), and Si Pitung Beraksi Kembali (Si Pitung Takes Action, 1981).

Overall, Arief appeared in more than sixty films in the 1970s. During this period he also became active on television, acting in the skit show Komedia Jakarta (Comedy of Jakarta). Misbach Yusa Biran, in his 1979 directory of Indonesian film actors, quotes Arief as saying "I actually do not have any talent for comedy. I am more interested in dramatic stories". (Note: Original: "Saya sebenarnya tak punya bakat lawak. Saya lebih tertarik pada cerita drama.")

Arief continued acting in the first years of the 1980s, making his final feature film, Pengorbanan (Sacrifice) in 1982. However, he did not quit acting, appearing in the TVRI television series Rumah Masa Depan (House of the Future, 1984–1986, 1989). In 1988 he received a Surjosoemanto Award from the National Film Council for his dedication to the art. Arief died in Jakarta on 20 December 1992.

== Filmography ==
During his 34-year career, Arief appeared in more than 120 films. He also produced a single film, Kembalilah Mama (Return, Mama, 1977).

- Anggrek Bulan (1948)
- Aneka Warna (1949)
- Menanti Kasih (1949)
- Tjitra (1949)
- Harta Karun (1949)
- Bintang Surabaja 1951 (1950)
- Inspektur Rachman (1950)
- Ditepi Bengawan Solo (1951)
- Mirah Delima (1951)
- Surjani Mulia (1951)
- Selamat Berdjuang, Masku! (1951)
- Bermain dengan Api (1952)
- Kekal Abadi (1952)
- Tiga Benda Adjaib (1952)
- Si Mientje (1952)
- Siapa Dia (1952)
- Bawang Merah Bawang Putih (1953)
- Burung Bitjara (1953)
- Empat Sekawan (1953)
- Harimau dan Merpati (1953)
- Pangeran Hamid (1953)
- Ratna Kumala (1953)
- Tiga Saudari (1953)
- Bawang Merah Tersiksa (1954)
- Derita (1954)
- Kleting Kuning (1954)
- Rewel (1955)
- Kasih Ibu (1955)
- Dibalik Dinding (1955)
- Rini (1956)
- Biola (1957)
- Konsepsi Ajah (1957)
- Bermain Api (1957)
- Bintang Peladjar (1957)
- Bunga dan Samurai (1958)
- Wanita Indonesia (1958)
- Habis Gelap Terbitlah Terang (Hilang Gelap Datang Terang) (1959)
- Mutiara jang Kembali (1959)
- Sekedjap Mata (1959)
- Kekota (1960)
- Kamar 13 (1961)
- Limapuluh Megaton (1961)
- Notaris Sulami (1961)
- DKN 901 (1962)
- Matjan Kemajoran (1965)
- Terpesona (1966)
- Sembilan (1967)
- Nji Ronggeng (1969)
- Laki-laki Tak Bernama (1969)
- Matt Dower (1969)
- Samiun dan Dasima (1970)
- Si Pitung (1970)
- Banteng Betawi (1971)
- Lisa (1971)
- Derita Tiada Akhir (1971)
- Djembatan Emas (1971)
- Kisah Fanny Tan (1971)
- Pendekar Sumur Tudjuh (1971)
- Penunggang Kuda dari Tjimande (1971)
- Ratna (1971)
- Mereka Kembali (1972)
- Merintis Djalan ke Sorga (1972)
- Pengantin Tiga Kali (1972)
- Romusha (1972)
- Samtidar (1972)
- Benyamin Biang Kerok (1972)
- Desa di Kaki Bukit (1972)
- Tiada Jalan Lain (1972)
- Bapak Kawin Lagi (1973)
- Benyamin Brengsek (1973)
- Biang Kerok Beruntung (1973)
- Cukong Blo'on (1973)
- PatGulipat (1973)
- Tendangan Maut (1973)
- Bajingan Tengik (Jagoan Tengik) (1974)
- Bandung Lautan Api (1974)
- Ali Baba (1974)
- Kosong-kosong Tiga Belas (0013) (1974)
- Tetesan Air Mata Ibu (1974)
- Pacar (1974)
- Kehormatan (1974)
- Pilih Menantu (1974)
- Buaye Gile (1974)
- Paul Sontoloyo (1974)
- Dasar Rezeki (1974)
- Musuh Bebuyutan (1974)
- Traktor Benyamin (1975)
- Samson Betawi (1975)
- Benyamin Tukang Ngibul (1975)
- Benyamin Raja Lenong (1975)
- Benyamin Koboi Ngungsi (1975)
- Gadis Simpanan (1976)
- Mustika Ibu (1976)
- Oma Irama Penasaran (1976)
- Benyamin Jatuh Cinta (1976)
- Tiga Janggo (1976)
- Hippies Lokal (1976)
- Zorro Kemayoran (1976)
- Saritem Penjual Jamu (1977)
- Sembilan Janda Genit (1977)
- Kembalilah Mama (1977)
- Raja Copet (1977)
- Sorga (1977)
- Penasaran (1977)
- Cakar Maut (1977)
- Gitar Tua Oma Irama (1977)
- Diana (1977)
- Pembalasan si Pitung (Jiih) (1977)
- Akulah Vivian (Laki-laki Jadi Perempuan) (1977)
- Jurus Maut (1978)
- Begadang (1978)
- Dewi Malam (1978)
- Tuyul (1978)
- Tuyul Eee Ketemu Lagi (1979)
- Darna Ajaib (1980)
- Begadang Karena Penasaran (1980)
- Goyang Dangdut (1980)
- Abizars (Pahlawan Kecil) (1980)
- Gundala Putra Petir (1981)
- Dukun Lintah (1981)
- Manusia 6.000.000 Dollar (1981)
- Si Pitung Beraksi Kembali (1981)
- Manusia Berilmu Gaib (1981)
- Pengorbanan (1982)
- Gadis Bionik (1982)
- Sentuhan Kasih (1982)
