= Garuda di Dadaku =

2009 Indonesian film

- Promotional poster
- Directed by: Ifa Isfansyah
- Written by: Salman Aristo
- Produced by: Shanty Harmayn
- Starring: Emir Mahira; Aldo Tansani; Marsha Aruan; Ikranegara; Maudy Koesnaedi; Ari Sihasale; Ramzi
- Cinematography: Rendi Soedoewendtju
- Edited by: Rachmad Supriyanto
- Music by: Titi Sjuman; Wong Aksan; Netral
- Production companies: SBO Films; Mizan Productions
- Distributed by: SBO Films; Mizan Productions
- Release date: 18 June 2009
- Running time: 99 minutes
- Country: Indonesia
- Language: Indonesian

Garuda di Dadaku (lit. 'Garuda in My Heart') is a 2009 Indonesian sports drama film directed by Ifa Isfansyah. It tells about a young boy who dreams of playing for Indonesia national under-13 football team despite his grandfather's wish for him to be an artist.

The film, Ifa's feature-length debut, was produced over six months and featured music by actress and musician, Titi Sjuman and her husband Wong Aksan, as well as a theme song by rock band Netral. Released during the school holidays, the film was viewed by more than 1.2 million people. Despite mixed critical reception, Garuda di Dadaku was nominated for three Citra Awards at the 2009 Indonesian Film Festival, where it received a special jury prize for Best Children's Film.

A sequel, Garuda di Dadaku 2, was released in 2011. Directed by Rudy Soedjarwo, it follows a grown-up Bayu serving as captain of the national youth team and deals with personal issues.

== Plot ==
Bayu (Emir Mahira) is a Grade 6 student who lives with his mother, Wahyuni (Maudy Koesnaedi), and grandfather, Usman (Ikranagara). Bayu's father, a taxi driver and former athlete, died in a car accident years ago. Although Bayu wishes to follow his father's footsteps as a footballer, Usman insists that he should be an artist; the grandfather enrols Bayu in numerous courses to improve his artistic skills.

Bayu sneaks in football practice with the help of his friend, Heri (Aldo Tansani), who uses a wheelchair, and Heri's driver Bang Dulloh (Ramzi). As they find an old and empty cemetery to practise in, its guardian, Zahra (Marsha Aruan), allows them to use it and supports Bayu's goal. Bayu is later discovered by coach Ari Sihasale at the local academy sponsored by Premier League club Arsenal, which gave him a chance to play for Indonesia national under-13 football team.

When Usman discovers that Bayu has been practising football, he pressures his grandson to quit. Bayu refuses and Usman reveals the truth that he did not want Bayu end up like his father. Usman later apologizes to Bayu for discouraging his athletic dreams. Eventually, Bayu is accepted as a member of the national team, which he helps win a tournament while Usman choose Zahra as his art student.

== Cast ==
- Emir Mahira as Bayu
- Aldo Tansani as Heri
- Marsha Aruan as Zahra
- Ikranagara as Pak Usman
- Maudy Koesnaedi as Wahyuni
- Ramzi as Mang Dulloh
- Ari Sihasale as Pak Johan
- Baron Yusuf as Benny
- Wilson Klein Sugianto as Arthur
- Landung Simatupang as Zahra's father
- Leroy Osmani as Pak Ivan
- Julius Denny as Pak Tukang Baso

== Production ==
Garuda di Dadaku was directed by Ifa Isfansyah. It was his first feature film, while he had previously produced and directed several short ones. Isfansyah had played football as a child, which played a role in the film's production. Salman Aristo was approached by producer Shanty Harmayn to write the screenplay, a task which he accepted.

Production took more than six months. Twelve-year-old Emir Mahira was cast in the lead role of Bayu after his football skills impressed the crew. Isfansyah found working with children difficult, as they often did not listen to directions. He began letting the children act naturally and found the results "moving". In an interview with The Jakarta Post, Isfansyah stated: "realized this film belonged to them. This is their world, and we, the adults, are like the keepers."

The Indonesian band Netral provided the film with its titular song, "Garuda di Dadaku", which was adapted from "Apuse", a traditional Papua folk song. Musical arrangement was handled by a couple of husband and wife named Wong Askan and Titi Sjuman.

== Release and reception ==
Upon its release on 18 June 2009, Garuda di Dadaku sold 1.2 million tickets, the largest number for the Indonesian film industry. In 2010, it was the opening film at the Michel Kinder und Jungen Filmfest, a film festival for children's films in Hamburg, Germany.

Critical reception of the film was mixed. Leila S. Chudori gave Garuda di Dadaku a glowing review in Tempo magazine, writing that it was able to make her, a person generally uninterested in football, enjoy the sport as portrayed on screen; she noted that the film was in the same vein as Bend It Like Beckham (2002). The review for Kompas described the film as being "like a meal where all the spices are just right", (Note: Original: "... tak ubahnya sebuah masakan yang racikan bumbunya terasa pas.") with good production values, acting, cinematography, and directing.

Rizal Iwan, one of the writers of The Jakarta Post, found the film's source of conflict unbelievable, as he doubted that a parent would prefer the arts over football. He also found the first half of the film "clunky". However, Iwan found that the remainder of the film flowed well and that Mahira's acting was consistent. The review for the Jakarta Globe, written by Marcel Thee, was scathing. Thee wrote that the film "feels like a dreary soap opera that does not belong on the big screen", with "mechanical" acting, "overdramatic" dialogue, and a "disjointed" narrative.

== Awards ==
Garuda di Dadaku was nominated for three Citra Awards at the 2009 Indonesian Film Festival but did not win any. However, it won a special jury prize for Best Children's Film.

Award	Year	Category	Recipient	Result
Indonesian Film Festival	2009	Best Children's Film		Won
Indonesian Film Festival	2009	Best Original Screenplay	Salman Aristo	Nominated
Indonesian Film Festival	2009	Best Leading Actor	Emir Mahira	Nominated
Indonesian Film Festival	2009	Best Musical Arrangement	Titi Sjuman, Wong Aksan	Nominated
