= Begadang =

1978 film

- Flyer
- Directed by: Maman Firmansyah
- Written by: Maman Firmansyah; Rhoma Irama
- Produced by: Zainal Abidin
- Starring: Yati Octavia; Billy Argo; Rhoma Irama; Chitra Dewi; Ade Irawan; Sukarno M. Noor; A. Hamid Arief; Doddy Sukma; Yetty Loren; Komalasari; Fakhri Amrullah; Urip Arphan; Pipiet Sandra
- Distributed by: Hanna Internasional Film
- Release date: 1978
- Running time: 111 minutes
- Country: Indonesia
- Language: Bahasa Indonesia

Begadang is an Indonesian film released in 1978 and directed by Maman Firmansyah. This film stars, among others, Rhoma Irama, Yati Octavia, and Billy Argo.
