= NTRL =

Indonesian rock band

- Also known as: Netral
- Origin: Jakarta, Indonesia
- Genres: Alternative rock, punk rock, pop punk, grunge
- Years active: 1992–present
- Labels: Bulletin (1995–2004); Kancut Records (2005–present)
- Members: Bagus Dhanar Dhana; Eno Gitara Ryanto; Christopher "Coki" Bollemeyer
- Past members: Gabriel Bimo Sulaksono; Ricky "Miten" Dayandani

NTRL (pronounced "Neutral", formerly Netral) is an Indonesian rock band formed in 1992 in Jakarta. The band has released 13 albums. Its current members are Bagus (vocals and bass), Eno (drums) and Coki (guitar).

== Career ==
In November 1992, Bagus formed Netral along with Bimo and Miten. The band released a self-titled album in 1995, with punk sounds dominant. It released another album, Wa.. Lah, in 1995. The lyrics are random and simple, combined with a "naughty" rock style. Its third album, Tidak Enak, was released in 1996, with a fourth, Album Minggu Ini, released the following year. After that, Bimo quit the band and was replaced by Eno. In 1999, Miten was replaced by Coki. The band then released Paten, which was followed by Oke Deh in 2001. In 2003, it released Kancut.

In 2005, Netral released two albums. Hitam, released on 7 February 2005, gave a "hard" and "dark" impression and consisted of seven tracks. The lyrics on "Bom" discuss bombings that terrorize people. "Atas Nama" explains persons acting on behalf of the public and love. The lyrics in "Koma" are about someone who finds inspiration in a coma, while the first track, "Haru Biru", tells about someone's journey through life. It was sold through fan bases, distros, and music magazines; only 7000 copies were published. Putih, a "softer" album, was released four months later. The first track, "Terbang Tenggelam", tells about someone's purposeless love journey. Since these albums, Netral has released its albums through the indie label Kancut Records.

The band released its ninth album, entitled 9th, in July 2007. One of the songs, "Cinta Gila", has the theme of love and is about a woman who falls in love with a drummer of a band. A video clip was made for this song to improve album sales.

The Story Of was released in 2009. The song "Cipta Karya Jaya Rasa" has been described as full of rock, while "Hari Yang Indah" is more pop and jazzy. On "Api", the band invites listeners to enjoy life. "Seluas Samudera" describes a sincere and open heart, while "Kecoa dan Kupu-kupu" describes a sincere love and betrayal. The band also rearranged "Hari Merdeka", a medium tempo patriotic song, as a rock song.

In 2009, Netral released a song entitled "Garuda Di Dadaku" as part of a soundtrack for the film of the same name. Band members had difficulty when writing the lyrics and recording the song. In late 2009, the lyrics of the song were edited and the song renamed as "KPK Di Dadaku" to defend the government agency of eradication of corruption, which at the time was trouble.

In 2015, Netral officially changed its name to "NTRL". The band members mentioned that the reason for the name change is originated from a heated debate between Bagus and Bimo (former member, co-founder), where then Bimo threaten to trademark the name "Netral" for himself, since it wasn't registered before. When the current members realized that Bimo has formally started to register the trademark, they then decided to change the band name to "NTRL". Bimo has then apologized to the current band members, and formally withdrawn his trademark registration. However, the current band members decided to still use the new name "NTRL" officially, and will let their fans decide either to call them "NTRL" or "Netral".

== Discography ==
=== Netral ===
- Netral (1995)
- Tidak Enak (1997)
- Album Minggu Ini (1998)
- Paten (1999)
- Oke Deh (2001)
- Kancut (2003)
- Hitam (2005)
- Putih (2005)
- 9th (2007)
- The Story Of (2009)
- Unity (2012)

=== NTRL ===
- 11/12 (2015)
- XXV (2018)

=== Compilation albums ===
- The Best of Netral (2000)

== Band members ==
=== Current members ===
- Bagus Dhanar Dhana (Bagus) – vocal, bass guitar (1992–present)
- Eno Gitara Ryanto (Eno) – drums, backing vocal (1998–present)
- Christopher Bollemeyer (Coki) – guitar, backing vocal (2003–present)

=== Former members ===
- Gabriel Bimo Sulaksono (Bimo) – drums, backing vocal (1992–1998)
- Ricky Dayandani (Miten) – guitar, backing vocal (1992–1999)
