= Aminah Cendrakasih =

Indonesian actress (1938–2022)

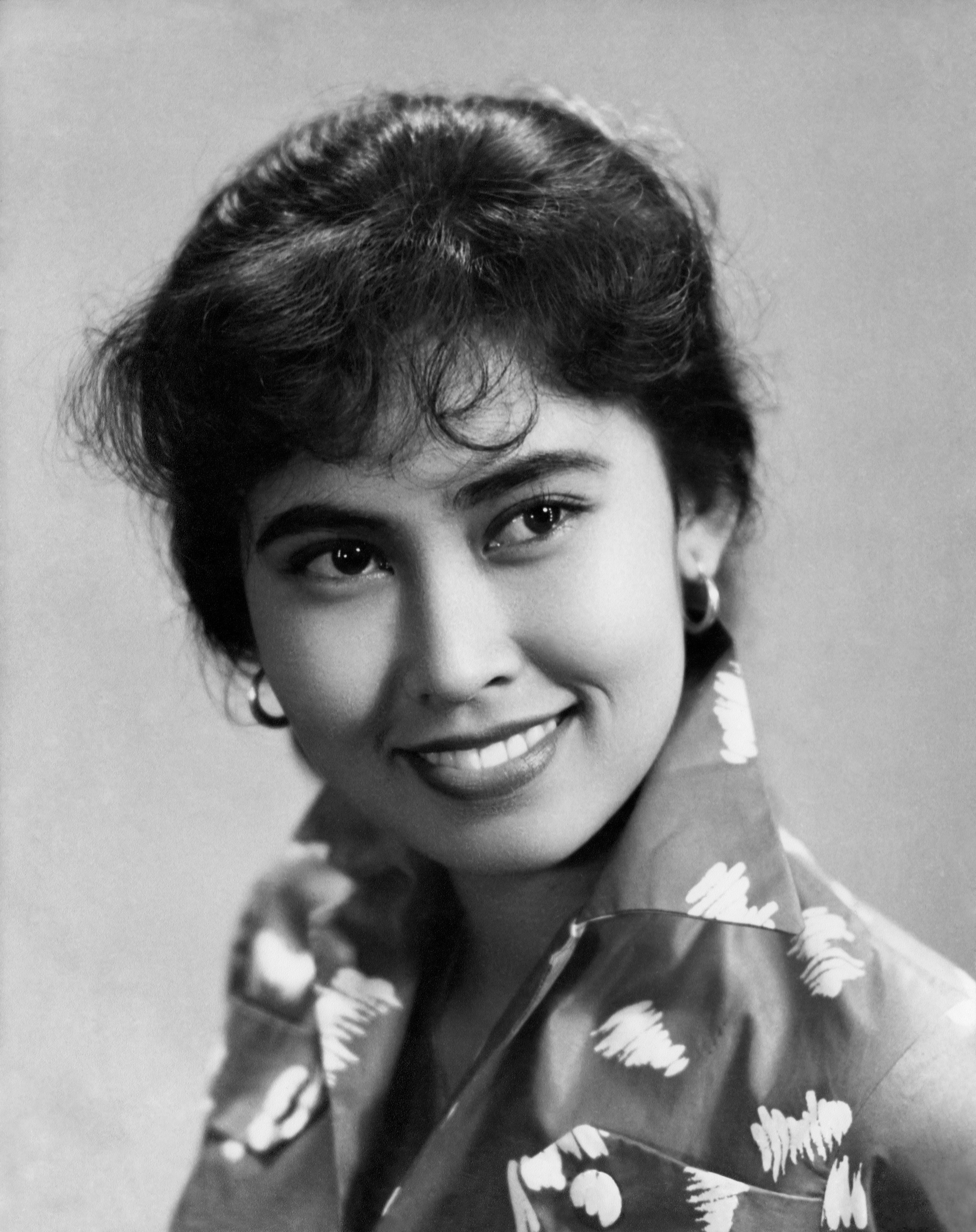
- Cendrakasih, c. 1959
- Born: Siti Aminah; 29 January 1938; Magelang, Dutch East Indies
- Died: 21 December 2022 (aged 84); South Tangerang, Indonesia
- Occupation: Actress
- Years active: 1955–2022
- Spouse: Idris Permana (m. 1959; died 1986)
- Children: 7
- Relatives: Roekiah (paternal aunt); Rahmat Kartolo (cousin)

Aminah Tjendrakasih (Note: Perfected Spelling: Aminah Cendrakasih) ([a.mi.nah tʃen.dra.ka.sɪh]; born Siti Aminah; 29 January 1938 – 21 December 2022) was an Indonesian actress best known for her appearance as Lela in the television series Si Doel Anak Sekolahan (Doel the Schoolchild, 1994–2005). Beginning her career in her teenage years, Cendrakasih had her first starring role in 1955's Ibu dan Putri (Mother and Daughter). She soared to popularity after taking a role in Serampang 12 along with Nun Zairina in 1956. Cendrakasih acted in more than a hundred feature films; in 2012 and 2013 she received Lifetime Achievement Awards from the Bandung Film Festival and the Indonesian Movie Awards.

== Biography ==
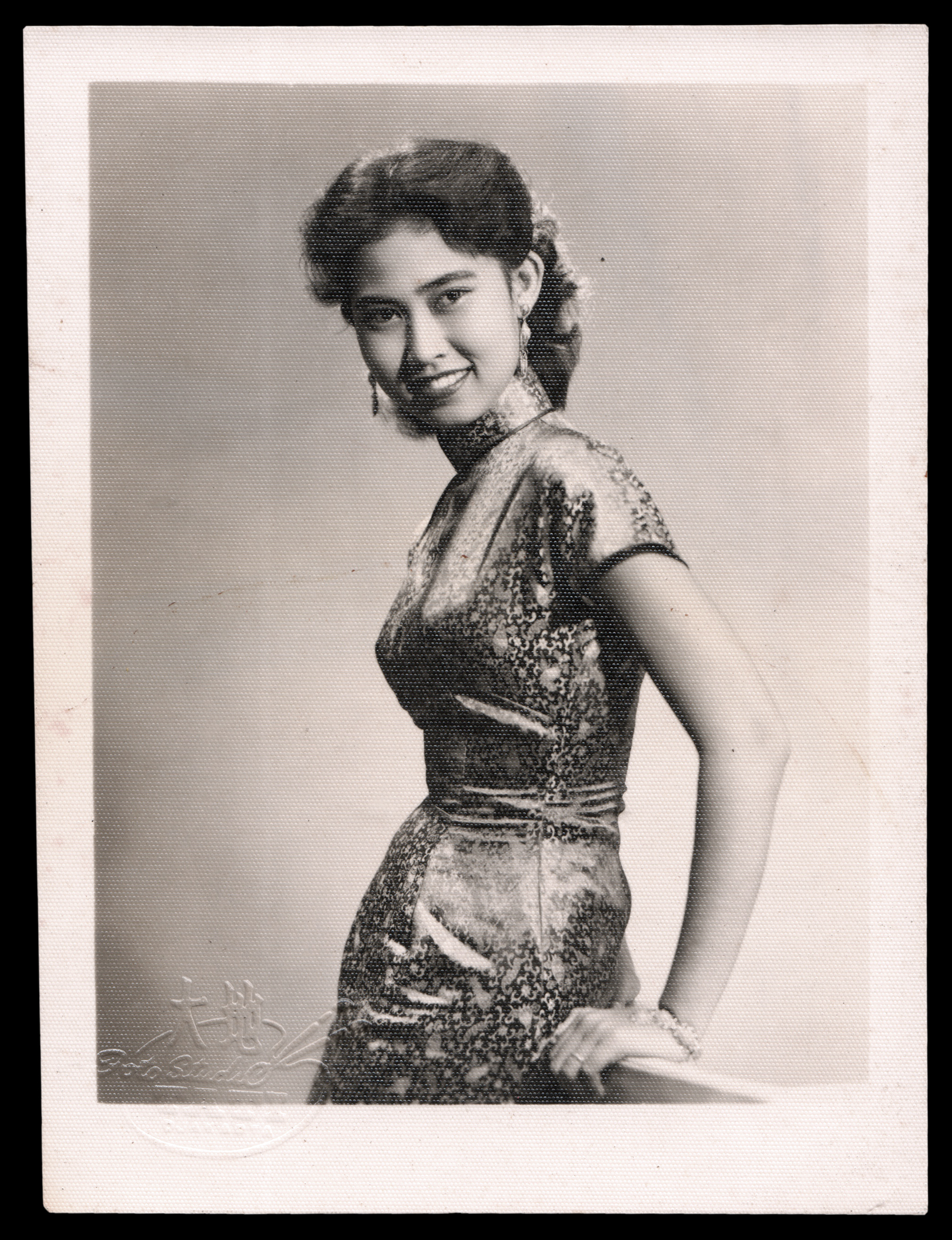
Aminah wearing a cheongsam dress, c. 1959.

Cendrakasih was born Siti Aminah in Magelang, Central Java, Dutch East Indies, on 29 January 1938. She was the daughter of the comedian Husin Nagib (died 1943) and the actress Wolly Sutinah (1916–1987). During her childhood, she moved to Jakarta. Cendrakasih studied at a Sekolah Kepandaian Putri, a school that taught young girls the skills needed to manage a household.

Cendrakasih began acting in her teens, at first on stage and later in film. JB Kristanto, in his catalogue of Indonesian films, lists her as having a role in S Waldy's Musafir Kelana (The Wanderer, 1953). The Indonesian film historian Misbach Yusa Biran writes that Cendrakasih made her feature film debut in Ali Joego's Oh, Ibuku (O, My Mother, 1955). Cendrakasih subsequently appeared in Gambang Semarang (Gambang from Semarang, 1955) alongside her mother. Her first starring role was Ibu dan Putri (Mother and Daughter, 1955), directed by Ha van Wu and co-starring Lies Noor.

Cendrakasih soared to popularity after taking a role as a dancer in Serampang 12 (1956) along with Nun Zairina. Zairina also soared to popularity too and then played along with her again in the Usmar Ismail's directed film Girls Dormitory (1958). Over the next four years she appeared in a further eleven films, including starring roles in Taman Harapan (Garden of Hope, 1957), Tjambuk Api (Whips of Fire, 1958), and Pak Prawiro (Mr Prawiro, 1958). After completing Habis Gelap Terbitlah Terang (After Darkness There is Light, 1959), directed by Ho Ah Loke, she married a Betawi man and took a hiatus from acting.

In 1970, Cendrakasih returned to acting, at first taking several television roles before returning to the silver screen the following year. She acted in sixty films in nine years, including Hostess Anita (Anita the Hostess, 1971), Aku Tak Berdosa (I Haven't Sinned, 1972), Si Doel Anak Modern (Doel the Modern Child, 1976), and Betty Bencong Slebor (Betty the Clumsy Transvestite, 1978). She was also a member of the Association of Islamic Arts and Culture (Himpunan Seni Budaya Islam) and the Betawi Cultural Institute (Lembaga Kebudayaan Betawi).

Cendrakasih remained highly active during the 1980s, appearing in some forty-two films. Her final feature film of the decade, and her last feature film as of 2016, was Lebih Asyik Sama Kamu (More Interesting with You, 1989). She also continued to act on television, including in the serial Rumah Masa Depan (House of the Future, 1984–1985). She achieved her greatest fame with the series Si Doel Anak Sekolahan (Doel the Schoolchild, 1994–2005). Director and star Rano Karno wrote for her and cast her in the role of Lela, Doel's mother, who is often referred to as Mak Nyak. In her book on the series, Klarijn Loven describes the character as offering a positive depiction of a house wife as an alternative for the common depiction of mothers as career women.

Cendrakasih suffered from glaucoma, lost her eyesight, and was bedridden. She received a Lifetime Achievement Award from the Bandung Film Festival in 2012, and another at the 2013 Indonesian Movie Awards. As Cendrakasih was in the hospital, the latter award was accepted by her daughter Ade Purba Sari. She had seven children.

Cendrakasih died at her residence in Pondok Aren, South Tangerang, on 21 December 2022, at age 84. She was interred with her mother in Karet Bivak Cemetery, Central Jakarta, the following day.

== Filmography ==
Cendrakasih appeared in almost a hundred and twenty films in her fifty-year career.

- Musafir Kelana (1953)
- Gadis Sesat (1955)
- Gambang Semarang (1955)
- Ibu dan Putri (1955)
- Oh, Ibuku (1955)
- Tjalon Duta (1955)
- Serampang 12 (1956)
- Konsepsi Ajah (1957)
- Taman Harapan (1957)
- Anakku Sajang (1957)
- Pak Prawiro (1958)
- Tjambuk Api (1958)
- Asrama Dara (1958)
- Habis Gelap Terbitlah Terang (Hilang Gelap Datang Terang) (1959)
- Bertjinta dalam Gelap (1971)
- Dara-Dara (1971)
- Hostess Anita (1971)
- Ilusia (Kasih Tak Terputuskan) (1971)
- Jang Djatuh Dikaki Lelaki (1971)
- Kisah Fanny Tan (1971)
- Penunggang Kuda dari Tjimande (1971)
- Tjisadane (1971)
- Mutiara dalam Lumpur (1972)
- Aku Tak Berdosa (1972)
- Intan Berduri (1972)
- Anak Yatim (1973)
- Bing Slamet Sibuk (1973)
- Ibu Sejati (1973)
- Pelarian (1973)
- Rindu (1973)
- Sebatang Kara (1973)
- Takdir (1973)
- Bajingan Tengik (Jagoan Tengik) (1974)
- Setulus Hatimu (1974)
- Pengorbanan (1974)
- Kosong-kosong Tiga Belas (0013) (1974)
- Pacar (1974)
- Susana (1974)
- Jangan Kau Tangisi (1974)
- Butet (Patah Tumbuh Hilang Berganti) (1974)
- Raja Jin Penjaga Pintu Kereta (1974)
- Ratapan si Miskin (1974)
- Senyum dan Tangis (1974)
- Sayangilah Daku (1974)
- Keluarga Sinting (1975)
- Syahdu (1975)
- Jinak-Jinak Merpati (1975)
- Benyamin Raja Lenong (1975)
- Aladin Agen Rahasia (1975)
- Malam Pengantin (1975)
- Cinta Kasih Mama (1976)
- Mustika Ibu (1976)
- Oma Irama Penasaran (1976)
- Kisah Cinta (1976)
- Hanya Untukmu (1976)
- Nasib Si Miskin (1977)
- Selimut Cinta (1977)
- Cintaku Tergadai (1977)
- Sorga (1977)
- Jeritan Si Buyung (1977)
- Penasaran (1977)
- Gitar Tua Oma Irama (1977)
- Selangit Mesra (1977)
- Ali Topan Anak Jalanan (1977)
- Macan Terbang (1977)
- Secerah Senyum (1977)
- Pukulan Berantai (1977)
- Sinyo Adi (1977)
- Petualang Cinta (1978)
- Betty Bencong Slebor (1978)
- Cowok Masa Kini (1978)
- Dari Mata Turun ke Hati (1979)
- Juwita (1979)
- Milikku (1979)
- Sepasang Merpati (1979)
- Hallo Sayang (1980)
- Nikmatnya Cinta (1980)
- Juara Cilik (1980)
- Beningnya Hati Seorang Gadis (1980)
- Kau Tercipta Untukku (1980)
- Begadang Karena Penasaran (1980)
- Jangan Sakiti Hatinya (1980)
- Goyang Dangdut (1980)
- Abizars (Pahlawan Kecil) (1980)
- Masih Adakah Cinta (1980)
- Tumbal Iblis (1981)
- Tomboy (1981)
- Bunga-bunga Perkawinan (1981)
- Pengorbanan (1982)
- Perempuan Bergairah (1982)
- Gadis Bionik (1982)
- Pengantin Remaja II (1982)
- Gadis Telepon (1983)
- Ken Arok - Ken Dedes (1983)
- Kadarwati (1983)
- Pokoknya Beres (1983)
- Merindukan Kasih Sayang (1984)
- Pencuri Cinta (1984)
- Biarkan Kami Bercinta (1984)
- Cinta Kembar (1984)
- Senyummu Senyumku (1984)
- Persaingan Remaja (1984)
- Itu Bisa Diatur (1984)
- Persaingan Asmara (1985)
- Pembalasan Rambu (1985)
- Tari Kejang (1985)
- Satu Cinta 1000 Dusta (1985)
- Yang Masih di Bawah Umur (1985)
- Atas Boleh Bawah Boleh (1986)
- Biarkan Bulan Itu (1986)
- Menyibak Kabut Cinta (1986)
- Cemburu Nih Yee... (1986)
- Aids Phobia (1986)
- Komedi Lawak 88 (1986)
- Akibat Kanker Payudara (1987)
- Ranjang Tak Bertuan (1988)
- Bendi Keramat (1988)
- Lebih Asyik Sama Kamu (1989)

== Legacy ==
On 29 January 2024, during her 86th birthday, Google honored Cendrakasih with a Doodle which was based from her character in Si Doel series.

== Works cited ==
- Al-Farisi, Baharuddin (22 December 2022). "Kronologi Meninggalnya Aminah Cendrakasih 'Mak Nyak', Muntah sejak Subuh" [Timeline of the Death of Aminah Cendrakasih 'Mak Nyak', Vomiting from Dawn]. Kompas (in Indonesian). Archived from the original on 23 December 2022.
- "Aminah Cendrakasih, Pemeran Mak Nyak di Si Doel Anak Sekolahan, Meninggal Dunia" [Aminah Cendrakasih, Portrayer of Mak Nyak in Si Doel Anak Sekolahan, Dies]. Kompas.com (in Indonesian). 21 December 2022. Archived from the original on 22 December 2022.
- Apa Siapa Orang Film Indonesia [What and Who: Film Figures in Indonesia] (in Indonesian). Jakarta: Indonesian Ministry of Information. 1999. OCLC 44427179.
- Biran, Misbach Yusa, ed. (1979). Apa Siapa Orang Film Indonesia 1926–1978 [What and Who: Film Figures in Indonesia, 1926–1978]. Jakarta: Sinematek Indonesia. OCLC 6655859.
- Dipa, Arya (13 May 2012). "The Mirror Never Lies Dominates Bandung Film Festival". The Jakarta Post. Archived from the original on 2 July 2016.
- Farouk, Yazir; Sumarni (29 May 2019). "5 Tahun di Tempat Tidur, Aminah Cendrakasih Habiskan Waktu dengan Berzikir". Suara.com (in Indonesian).
- "Filmografi Siti Aminah" [Siti Aminah Filmography]. filmindonesia.or.id (in Indonesian). Konfiden Foundation. Archived from the original on 2 July 2016.
- Kristanto, JB, ed. (2007). Katalog Film Indonesia 1926–2007. Jakarta: Nalar. ISBN 978-979-26-9006-4.
- Loven, Klarijn (2008). Watching Si Doel: Television, Language, and Culture Identity in Contemporary Indonesia. Leiden: KITLV Press. ISBN 9789067182799.
- Nurrijal, Muhammad Ahsan (21 December 2022). "Suasana Rumah Duka Aminah Cendrakasih 'Mak Nyak' Dipenuhi Pelayat" [Funeral Home for Aminah Cendrakasih 'Mak Nyak' Full of Bereaved]. Detik.com (in Indonesian). Archived from the original on 23 December 2022.
- "Pemakaman Aminah Cendrakasih 'Mak Nyak' Diselimuti Suasana Haru" [Funeral of Aminah Cendrakasih 'Mak Nyak' Full of Melancholy]. CNN Indonesia (in Indonesian). Archived from the original on 22 December 2022.
- Puspasari, Desi (21 December 2022). "Berita Duka, Aminah Cendrakasih 'Mak Nyak' Meninggal Dunia" [Sad news, Aminah Cendrakasih 'Mak Nyak' has passed]. Detik.com (in Indonesian). Archived from the original on 21 December 2022.
- Putra, Rama Narada (27 May 2013). "Air Mata Iringi Penghargaan untuk Aminah Cendrakasih" [Tears Accompany Award for Aminah Cendrakasih]. Okezone.com (in Indonesian). Archived from the original on 5 March 2016.
