= Ave Maryam =

2019 Indonesian romance drama film

- Worldwide release poster
- Directed by: Ertanto Robby Soediskam
- Screenplay by: Ertanto Robby Soediskam
- Produced by: Ertanto Robby Soediskam; Tia Hasibuan
- Starring: Maudy Koesnaedi; Chicco Jerikho; Tutie Kirana; Olga Lydia; Joko Anwar; Nathania Angela
- Cinematography: Ican Tanjung
- Edited by: Wawan I. Wibowo
- Music by: Rooftopsound; The Spouse
- Production companies: Summerland; Randolph Bubu Production; Prodigihouse Postproduction; Grafent Production
- Distributed by: Summerland
- Release dates: 2018 (Hanoi); 11 April 2019 (Indonesia)
- Running time: 85 minutes
- Country: Indonesia
- Language: Indonesian
- Box office: est. Rp. 3.2 billion

Ave Maryam (local parlance: [a'fɛ ma'rɪam]), initially titled Salt Is Leaving the Sea, is a 2018 Indonesian romantic drama film written, directed, and produced by Ertanto Robby Soediskam. Starring Maudy Koesnaedi, Chicco Jerikho, Tutie Kirana, Olga Lydia, Joko Anwar, and Nathania Angela, it concerns a forbidden romantic relationship between a Roman Catholic religious sister and her pastor. Made under the sentiment of the lack of non-Muslim films in Indonesia, the film was shot for nine days in 2016, and features a soundtrack by Aimee Saras.

After its premiere at the 2018 Hanoi International Film Festival, Ave Maryam premiered nationally at the Jogja-NETPAC Asian Film Festival on 30 November and was theatrically released on 11 April 2019. It was released on Netflix in September 2020; a version from which 12 minutes of footage were removed was shown theatrically and on Netflix while the uncut version was screened at film festivals. The film received positive reviews; it was praised for its Catholic theme and symbolic elements, but was criticized for being unrealistic. It won three awards and was a candidate for Indonesia's 92nd Academy Awards submission.

== Plot ==
Maryam, a 40-year-old woman from a Muslim family, works in a multireligious orphanage. In 1980, having become a Catholic, she moves to Ambarawa, Semarang, to work as a religious sister at St. Stanislaus Girisonta Church after meeting seven friendly older sisters and deciding to be their assistant. Pastor Martin introduces her to senior nun Monic and monastery manager Mila. (Note: Only included in the uncut version.) Maryam's work involves showering elderly sisters, cleaning, and preparing meals. She is helped by Dinda, a young Muslim who frequently sends milk and food.

One day, the sisters receive the announcement Martin is being replaced with new pastor Yosef—Monic's foster child—until Christmas. Martin had predicted Yosef's presence for a long time. Yosef is tasked to teach musicianship to the sisters. Yosef's high level of musical ability makes Maryam fall in love with him. Monic warns Yosef about Maryam's attitude but fails to persuade him. Maryam and Yosef become closer despite knowing it is prohibited in the Church; at one point, they run naked on a beach and make out. Maryam is guilt-ridden and questions her faith, and despite the sisters' attempts to calm her down, leaves the church upon their notice. She boards a city-bound train but imagines Yosef looking at her, tempting her to disembark and miss the train.

Maryam goes to Girisonta's confessional where, unbeknown to her, Yosef is the pastor. Yosef disguises his voice and after hearing her apology, he silently cries with heartbreak. Maryam leaves after the sisters pass by.

== Cast ==
- Maudy Koesnaedi as Sister Maryam
- Chicco Jerikho as Romo Yosef
- Tutie Kirana as Sister Monic
- Olga Lydia as Sister Mila
- Joko Anwar as Romo Martin
- Nathania Angela as Dinda

== Production ==
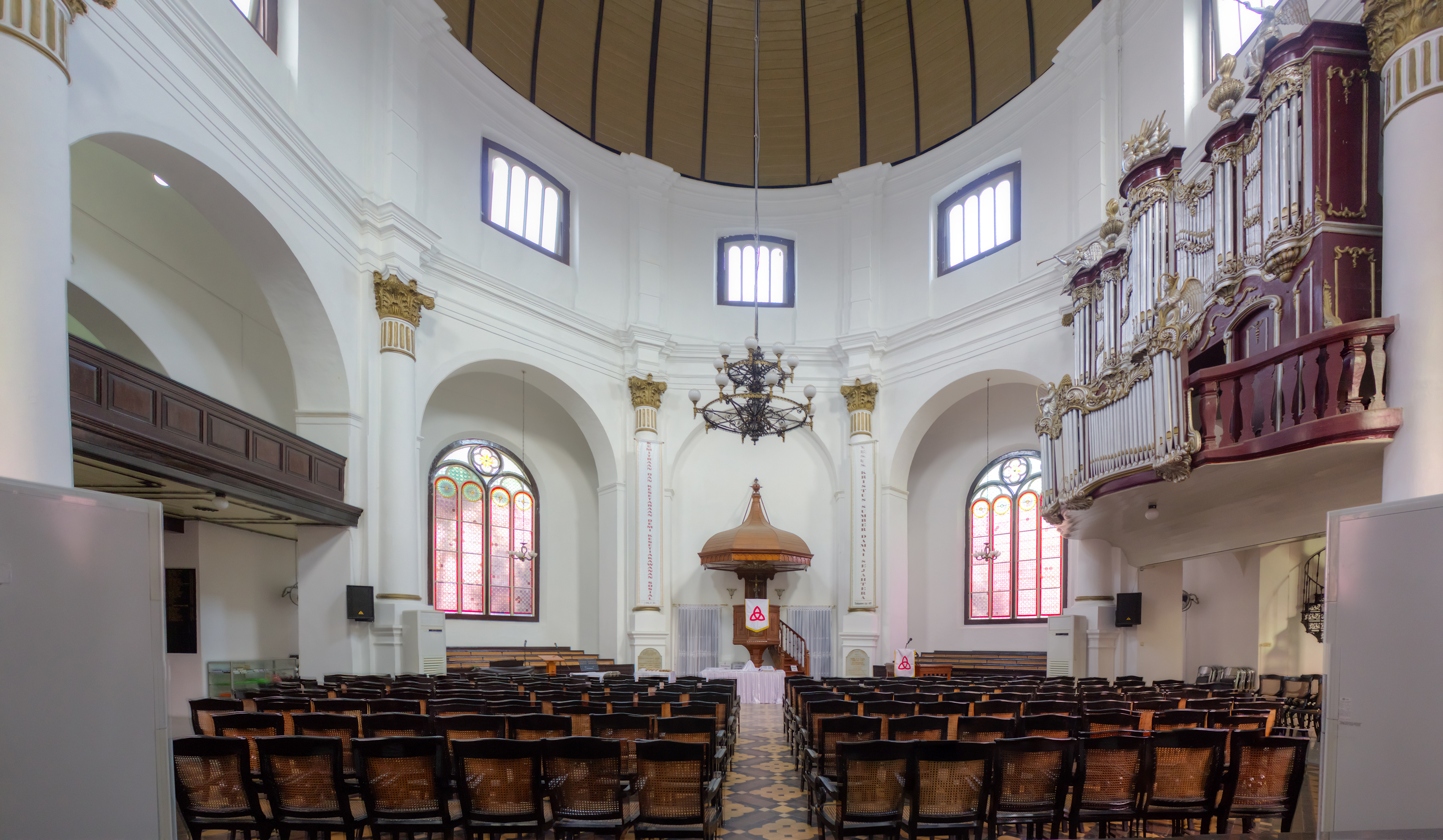
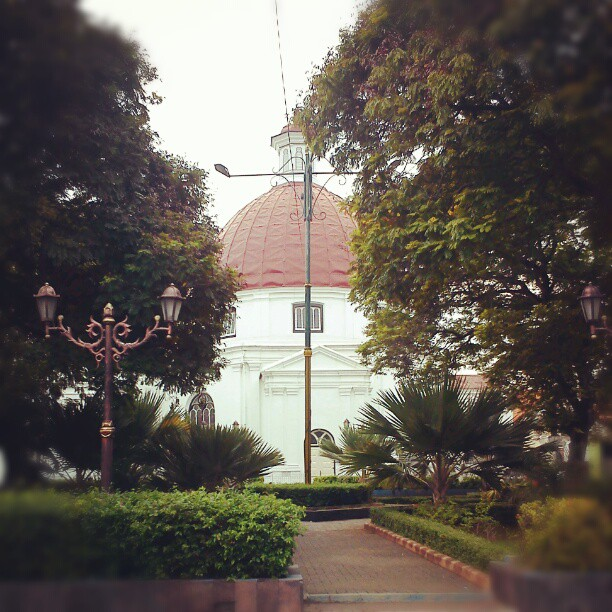
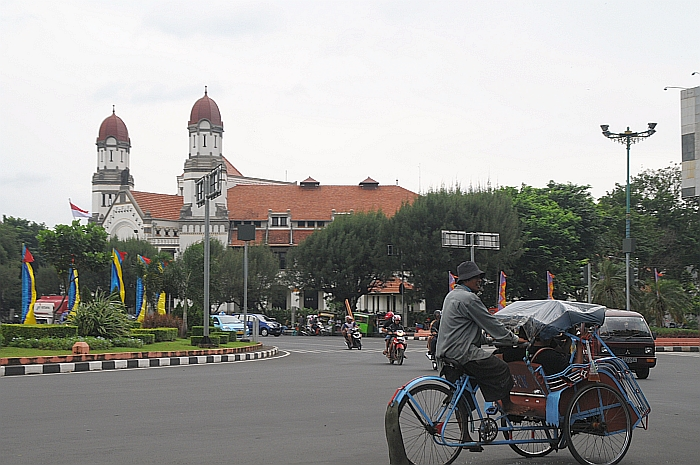
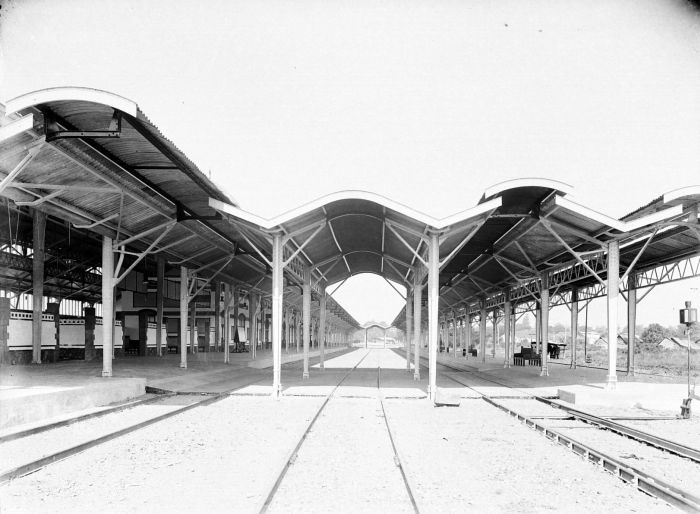
Places featured in Ave Maryam. From left to right: Blenduk Church, Srigunting Garden, Lawang Sewu, and Semarang Tawang railway station. Not pictured here is the Fransiskus Monastery.

Ave Maryam, which is based upon real-life events, (Note: Written in the credits.) was initially titled Salt is Leaving the Sea (Indonesian: Garam Meninggalkan Lautnya). The title was changed to Ave Maryam, a blend of "Ave Maria" and "Maryam," Maryam being Arabic form of Maria.

Before starting production, the film's crew sent letters seeking approval to related organizations, including the Semarang diocese, realizing the Indonesian public might interpret its theme as sensitive. Director, writer, and producer Ertanto Roby Soediskam said he was ready to face any controversy, saying; "We made the film honestly, so we are ready to bear that risk". Ertanto said he was bored of Indonesian films that consistently feature Muslim themes because Islam is the dominant religion in Indonesia, thus he was making a film about Catholicism. Ertanto hoped the film benefits the audiences in their social and family lives. Additionally, Nathania Angela also stars in her first film role.

After receiving approval, principal photography began in Semarang and Yogyakarta on 26 November 2016, and ended nine days later. The equipment for the film was borrowed. As a noncommercial project, the crew would not receive any portion of the box office revenue because of the film's goal of "coloring" the cinema of Indonesia. Ertanto insisted the film would not have any form of follow-up. The film's poster and trailer were revealed in late September 2018.

Maudy Koesnaedi initially declined to be part of the film but Ertano persuaded her. Koesnaedi became ill during filming, causing a pause in production. Her husband Erik Meijer permitted her to be involved in the project "if it could cure her sickness" but she was still ill during principal photography. Preparing for her challenging role, Maudy met with senior nuns and observed their daily lives. Maryam is Maudy first major film role. The consensus to cast Maudy was not based purely on religion; Ertanto realized she was Muslim after production; her role in the film led the general public to question her "true religion".

Ave Maryam's soundtrack was sung by jazz singer Aimee Saras. The gospel song for the end credits is titled "Sacred Heart" and is based on the eponymous Catholic devotion. Inspiration for the song came from the music of Lana Del Rey. The Christian hymns "O Holy Night", "Gloria in excelsis Deo", and "How Great Thou Art" are also heard in Ave Maryam.

== Release ==
Still using the title Salt is Leaving the Sea (Vietnamese: Muối đang rời xa biển), Ave Maryam premiered at the 2018 Hanoi International Film Festival and also screened at the 2018 Hong Kong Asian Film Festival and the 2018 Cape Town International Film Market & Festival. It also screened at the 4th ASEAN International Film Festival & Awards, where it won in the Best Editing category. It also screened at the CinemAsia Film Festival for two days, the QCinema International Film Festival 2019, and in the Asian Film Festival Barcelona. In April 2019, the 14th Melbourne Indonesian Film Festival (IFF) screened the film alongside Keluarga Cemara, Night Bus, and Turah. Ave Maryam was also screened at Paragon Cineplex, Bangkok, on 6 July 2019 for the Bangkok ASEAN Film Festival.

Ave Maryam was first shown in Indonesia at the Jogja-NETPAC Asian Film Festival on 30 November 2018, and later on 14 November 2019 at the Plaza Indonesia Film Festival. It was the closing film for the 2019 Asia Africa Film Festival, for which tickets sold out. The film opened in Indonesia on 11 April 2019 in 39 theaters on the same day as Bumi Itu Bulat and Sunyi. Ave Maryam's release had been planned for February. The theatrical "gala premiere" was at Epicentrum XXI in Jakarta on 4 April 2019; there was a meet-and-greet and Q&A session before the film started. Audiences of the film were referred to as saksi cinta Maryam ("witnesses of Maryam's love story"). The film attracted an estimated audience of 42,044 as of 14 April, and 77,000 as of 24 April. If Ave Maryam had been a commercial project, it is estimated it would have garnered Rp. 3.2 billion.

In Indonesia, the Film Censorship Board (LSF) distributed two versions of Ave Maryam; a cut, 17+ version and an uncut, 21+ version. The 17+ version was used for theaters while the 21+ version was screened at film festivals. The uncut duration is 85 minutes long while the cut version is 74 minutes long. Many criticized the LSF for cutting important scenes that were deemed explicit rather than blurring them. After a year without information, the LSF-censored version of the film was released on Netflix on 3 September 2020; Netflix received criticism from the general public for choosing the cut version when they would not have any legal problems if they released the uncut version.

== Reception ==
A dream scene of Maryam at the beach naked, questioning her faith in serving Jesus. The film was lauded for incorporating both romantic elements and Catholic themes; it was also praised for its "investigative" visuals.

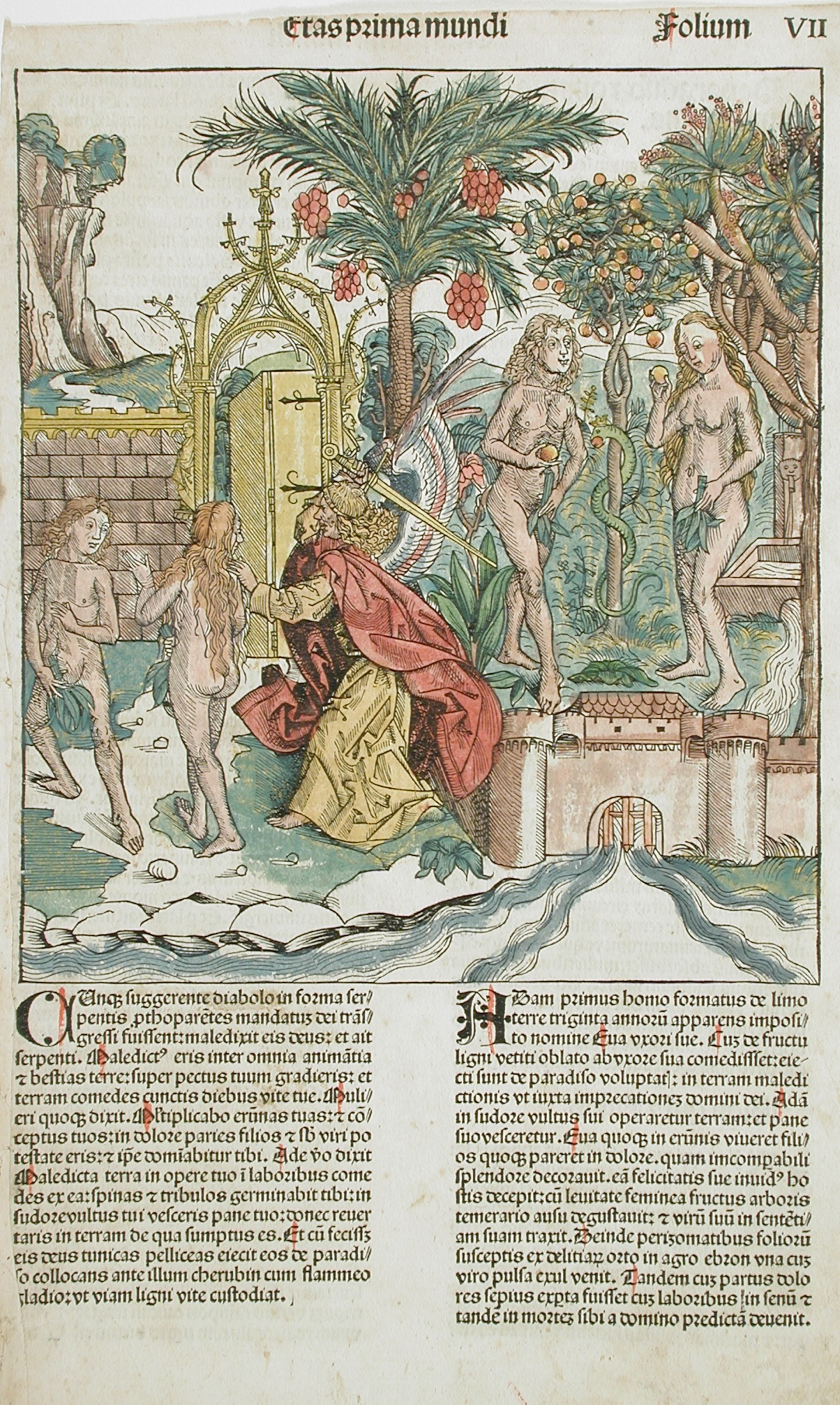
The film has been compared with the story of Adam and Eve, who took the forbidden fruit and defied God's rules.

Some critics praised Ave Maryam, calling it a significant influence on Indonesian cinema. The film's combination of realism and surrealism was also praised. Media Indonesia's Fathurrozak said its theme of religious tolerance succeeds in "begging for tolerance without ranting vaguely". Critics from Tempo praised the soundtrack as a "lust builder", the cinematography as "poetic yet violent", and the film as a whole for being semiotic. The magazine's Astari Pinasthika Sarosa analyzed the changing of Maryam's clothing palette as the film progresses; the design becomes darker as situations intensify. Ave Maryam has been compared with the films of Wong Kar-wai and the biblical story of Adam and Eve.

CNN Indonesia praised the film's taboo elements, Ical Tanjung's cinematography for capturing Semarang beautifully, and the ending, which the reviewer called "soul-floating". CNN Philippines' Gil Perez said; "There is not much to say about [it] because not much happens. The film feels like a short film stretched out to an hour and 15 minutes". Perez also wrote the film "goes for a more somber, internal treatment" of its romance theme. Calling it "needlessly melancholic", he doubted many scenes in the film are worthy of inclusion.

Criticism of some elements in the film also arose. Muhammad Reza Fadillah of Ulasinema criticized a scene in which Anwar wears a G-Shock watch that was on sale three years after the film's time setting, which interferes with the time alignment. Student newspaper BPMF Pijar criticized the excessive use of deus ex machina. Stanley Widianto of The Jakarta Post wrote; "Ave Maryam is weak-willed. It's not a thought-provoking movie and it doesn't even masquerade as one. Guilt, because of its cursory treatment, becomes an afterthought when it should have been the crux of the story." Tirto.id was disappointed with the film and said Maryam's introversion makes her "unsympathetic" while CNN Indonesia regretted the lack of portrayal of Maryam's character.

Novita Widia of film review website The Display said the film's ending, the confessional scene, hints at signs of gender disparity in churches; it said in that scene, "[the nuns] clearly didn't hold as much power to get rid of him or belittle [Yosef's] influence at the church. [His] superior position held them back from expressing their anger, disappointment, or worries [...] Putting Father Yosef's flirtatious attempt to Sister Maryam in the first place, this kind of treatment was clearly troubling." The reviewer called the movie "a strong reminder that women's roles in a religious body are often marginalized by the hierarchy system that often dominated and gives advantages to men".

== Accolades ==
Along with 27 Steps of May, Ave Maryam was a candidate for the Indonesia entry of the 92nd Academy Awards, but failed to Kucumbu Tubuh Indahku.

Award	Date of ceremony	Category	Recipient(s)/Nominee(s)	Result	Ref.
ASEAN International Film Festival & Awards	4 May 2019	Best Editing	Ave Maryam	Won	
Bandung Film Festival	23 November 2019	Best Cinematographer	Ical Tanjung	Won	
Hong Kong Asian Film Festival	2018	New Talented Director	Ertanto Robby Soediskam	Nominated	
Hanoi International Film Festival	2018	Best Movie	Ave Maryam	Nominated	
Indonesian Film Festival	12 November 2019	Best Cinematography	Ical Tanjung	Nominated	
QCinema International Film Festival	29 September 2019	Gender Sensitivity Award	Ave Maryam	Nominated	
QCinema International Film Festival	29 September 2019	Best Film	Ave Maryam	Nominated	
QCinema International Film Festival	29 September 2019	Best Actress	Maudy Koesnaedi	Nominated	
Film Pilihan Tempo	6 December 2018	Tempo Supporting Actress Choice	Tutie Kirana	Won	
Film Pilihan Tempo	6 December 2018	Tempo Actress Choice	Maudy Koesnaedi	Nominated	
Film Pilihan Tempo	6 December 2018	Best Supporting Actor	Olga Lidya	Nominated	

== See also ==
- Madame Bovary, a novel featured in the film
- Maryam (name)
  - Miriam (given name)
