= Vasuki (disambiguation) =

Vasuki is a serpent king in Hindu and Buddhist mythology.

Vasuki may also refer to:

- Vasuki (wife of Valluvar), the wife of ancient Tamil poet Valluvar
- Vasuki Bhaskar, Indian fashion and costume designer
- Vasuki (film), a 1997 Indian Tamil-language film
- Puthiya Niyamam, 2016 Indian Malayalam-language film by A. K. Sajan, dubbed into Tamil and Telugu as Vasuki
- Vasuki, a genus of prehistoric snake

== See also ==
- Basuki (disambiguation)
