= Benyamin Koboi Ngungsi =

1975 western parody film by Benyamin Sueb

- Theatrical release poster
- Directed by: Nawi Ismail
- Screenplay by: A. Kadir
- Produced by: Benyamin Sueb
- Starring: Benyamin Sueb; Connie Sutedja; Muni Cader; Eddy Gombloh; Grace Simon; S. Bagio; A. Hamid Arief; Ardi HS; Nani Wijaya
- Cinematography: H.M. Taba
- Edited by: Muryadi
- Music by: Beib Benyamin
- Production company: PT Jiung Film
- Release date: 1975
- Country: Indonesia
- Language: Indonesian

Koboi Ngungsi (Indonesian: "Refugee Cowboy" (Note: Also called "The Evacuate Cowboy" as featured in the film's title card.)), also known as Benyamin Koboi Ngungsi ("Benyamin the Refugee Cowboy") is a 1975 Indonesian Western parody comedy film directed by Nawi Ismail and produced by Benyamin Sueb. The film stars legendary comedians Benyamin Sueb, Eddy Gombloh, S. Bagio, as well as Connie Sutedja, Muni Cader, Grace Simon, A. Hamid Arief, Ardi HS, and Nani Wijaya.

The film was produced at the height of the Spaghetti Western's popularity and was inspired by another Western movie titled Bing Slamet Koboi Cengeng ("Bing Slamet the Crybaby Cowboy"), released a year earlier. The movie blends a classic Western narrative with unique Indonesian comedic elements.

It marks Benyamin Sueb's first Western-themed film, a style he revisited in later projects. These include Tiga Janggo ("The Three Djangos"), a 1976 parody of the Spaghetti Western Django, and Komedi Lawak 88 ("Funny Comedy '88"), which was also released under the title Koboi Insyaf ("The Cowboy Who Repented").

== Plot ==
Billy Ball (Benyamin Sueb) and Charles Dongo (Eddy Gombloh) own a horse ranch on the outskirts of Bodong City. However, they are forced to vacate the property, as the sheriff and surveyors announced the land has been slated for a government joint-venture factory construction project, leaving only a 1-by-1-meter plot. Dissatisfied with the decision, Billy and Charles—who is suffering from a fever at the time—sets out to Bodong City to demand compensation from the marshal (A. Hamid Arief).

Along their way, the duo mistakes the sound of firecrackers for gunshots and mistakenly fires at a nearby house. Upon learning that the sound was made by William Ardhy's (Ardi HS) grandchildren, Billy apologized and explained his circumstances to the family. William invites them to stay for the night before continuing their journey.

Upon arriving in Bodong City, Billy was summoned to the marshal station for violating two laws: horse littering and riding without a helmet. After cleaning up the litter, Billy and Chalres went to the saloon and met the two ladies who were Ardhy's daughters, Connie (Connie Sutedja) and Carrie (Grace Simon). There, they also met the main antagonist, a notorious outlaw named Jimmy Dogdog (Muni Cader). A brawl breaks out between Billy and Jimmy's gang, causing chaos. Billy escapes on his horse while Jimmy's crew pursues him. Urged by one of Ardhy's daughters to help Billy, Charles searches for his partner while riding a stolen kuda lumping (traditional Javanese flat horse puppet).

Following the saloon disturbance, the marshal orders the arrest of both Billy and Jimmy. Once detained at the station, Billy requests compensation for his ranch, but the marshal denies the claim due to a lack of legal land documentation. Following his release, the ladies take Billy back to their home, where the grandfather gifts him a motorcycle.

A little while later, Jimmy's gang surrounds the Ardhy residence, demanding to know where Billy is. The family attempted to defend themselves but was ultimately outgunned and taken hostage. One grandchild, Ali, manages to escape and finds Billy and Charles. Together, they manage to defeat and capture Jimmy with the help of firecrackers. Billy turns the outlaw over to the deputy marshal but refuses to accept the bounty reward.

== Cast ==
- Benyamin Sueb as Billy Ball
- Eddy Gombloh as Charles Dongo
- A. Hamid Arief as Marshal Jack Hamid
- Ardi HS as Grandfather/William Ardhy
- Connie Sutedja as Connie
- Grace Simon as Carrie
- Muni Cader as Jimmy Dogdog
- Nani Wijaya as Barmaid
- S. Bagio as Kuda lumping owner
- Benny Gaok as Sheriff

== Songs ==
- Koboi Ngungsi
- Kicir-Kicir
- Mari Berjoget
- Ngibing
- Selamat Tinggal

The songs were sung by Benyamin S. and Grace Simon, with accompaniment from The Bebi's led by Beib Benyamin.

== Reception ==
The movie contains social commentary on the modernization and bureaucracy of Jakarta during the 1970s. One of the scenes involves a dispute between Billy and the sheriff over his land, which is to be vacated for the construction of a factory. The conflict reflects Jakarta's development as a rapidly modernizing city during the period. At the time, areas of Jakarta were developed as part of the city's modernization, often at the cost of older buildings and structures being demolished, drawing a parallel with the conflict depicted in the film. Even though political implications are not strongly developed throughout the remainder of the film, much of the plot revolves around Billy attempting to negotiate with the marshal over compensation.

Film expert David Hanan compared this movie to Lonesome Cowboys, a 1968 American Western drama film directed by Andy Warhol. According to Hanan, the "gado-gado Western", a term he coined for the Indonesian spoof subgenre of Western films, is said to "radically question the codes of the macho Hollywood Western".

The movie uses one of the commonly used trope of cinematography used in movies from the New Order era, in which a fast zoom-in is employed to enhance and enunciate the element of surprise. the visual movement of the zoom serves to display psychological or emotional shifts, and thus can generate humor organically through cinematic language rather than conventional comedic tropes such as slapstick, etc.

== See also ==
- Buffalo Boys – 2018 Indonesian-Singaporean Western film
