= Mustika Ibu =

1976 film

Mustika Ibu is a 1976 Indonesian film based on Gono Tirtowidjojo's autobiography. Mustika Ibu was directed by Wisjnu Mouradhy and produced by Jeffry Sani. Mustika Ibu was played by several major artists such as Deddy Sutomo, A. Hamid Arief, Aminah Cendrakasih, Mansjur Sjah, Maruli Sitompul, Eva Devi, Debby Cynthia Dewi, and Bagus Santoso. The movie also won two trophies at the 1997 Indonesian Film Festival for Best Artistic Director and Best Child Actor.

== Plot ==
A biographical film about an indigenous child named Gono Tirtowidjojo, this film tells the story of his life's struggles from being a diamond slave to becoming a successful shipping entrepreneur in his day. This film starts from childhood, until he reaches adulthood until past the Dutch era, the Japanese era, the early days of independence to the era of independence. Due to economic pressures, Gono was sold to China from birth and lived from one adoptive parent to another, until Gono met his biological mother in Karawang, Indonesia. As an adult, Gono tried to improve his economic life until he finally succeeded in becoming a successful shipping entrepreneur
