= Basuki (comedian) =

Indonesian actor and comedian (1956–2007)

- Born: Agus Basuki bin Suwito Hadiwiryono; 5 March 1956; Surakarta, Central Java, Indonesia
- Died: 12 December 2007 (aged 51); Jakarta, Indonesia
- Occupations: Actor, comedian
- Years active: 1981–2007

Agus Basuki bin Suwito Hadiwiryono (5 March 1956 – 12 December 2007), or mononymously known as Basuki, was an Indonesian actor and comedian. He was a member of the Indonesian comedy troupe, Srimulat. However, he became famous after appearing in the program, Si Doel Anak Sekolahan in the 1990s. He was also famous for creating a jingle called "Wes Ewes Ewes Bablas Angine" for a traditional medicine commercial.

Basuki collapsed following a game of futsal on 12 December 2007. He was rushed to Melia Hospital in Jakarta, Indonesia, where he died at the age of 51 (heart attack).
