= Maudy Koesnaedi =

Indonesian actress (born 1975)

- Maudy in 2015
- Born: Maudy Kusnaria Koesnaedi; 8 April 1975 (age 51); Jakarta, Indonesia
- Education: University of Indonesia
- Spouse: Frederik Johannes Meijer (m. 2001)
- Children: 1

Maudy Kusuaria Koesnaedi (born 8 April 1975) is an Indonesian actress and model. After winning the title Miss Jakarta at the 1993 Abang None Jakarta pageant, she was cast as Zaenab in the television series Si Doel Anak Sekolahan (1993–1998). This role brought her to prominence, and through 2006 she appeared in numerous television series. Tired of the rapid shooting schedules necessitated by the medium, in 2006 she made her feature film debut with minor roles in Betina ('She-Beast') and Love for Share. She has since appeared in more than twenty films, including three in which she reprised the role of Zaenab, and been nominated for the Citra Award for Best Actress in 2014 and 2022. For her portrayal of Inggit Garnasih in the 2013 film Soekarno, Maudy won Best Supporting Actress at the 2014 Indonesian Movie Awards.

== Biography ==
Maudy was born on 8 April 1975 in Kuningan, South Jakarta, to Koesnaedy Bagdja and Sondari Soemijati. In 1993, she won the title Miss Jakarta at the Abang None Jakarta pageant. Shortly thereafter, she was cast in the television series Si Doel Anak Sekolahan ('Doel the Schoolchild') as Zaenab, the girlfriend of the main character Doel (Rano Karno). In a 2009 interview, she described the cast and crew as very supportive of her efforts to learn acting, as it was her first role. The series, based on an earlier novel and film, was widely popular, and through it Maudy became a household name.

During her time with Si Doel Anak Sekolahan, Maudy also appeared in the series Balada Dangdut ('The Dangdut Ballad', 1996) and Getawr Dawai Hati ('The Quiver of Heart Strings') as well as music videos for the bands Kahitna and Java Jive. She received a degree in French literature from the University of Indonesia, though due to her commitments as Miss Jakarta and Si Doel's shooting schedule, her studies were delayed several times.

In 1997, Maudy made her film debut in Garin Nugroho's television film Angin Rumput Savana ('Wind on the Savannah'). Between 1998 and 2000, she held concurrent roles in the series Jangan Ucapkan Cinta ('Don't Say Love') and Janji Hati ('Heart's Promise'). These were followed by several short-lived series, including Camelia (2000), Si Doel Anak Gedongan ('Doel the Builder', 2005), and Maha Kasih ('The All-Loving', 2006). Her characters on these shows were characterized by Bruce Emond of The Jakarta Post as often empathetic and long-suffering.

In the mid-2000s, tired of the brisk shooting schedules of television series, Maudy began appearing in feature films, with minor roles in Betina ('She-Beast') and Love for Share (both 2006). After some time in the theatre, which included developing a play based on Tjerita Njai Dasima as well as a musical ensemble show featuring forty alumni of the Abang None Jakarta pageant, she returned to cinema with Ifa Isfansyah's film Garuda di Dadaku ('Garuda in My Chest', 2009). In this film, she played the mother of the protagonist, a young child with dreams of playing professional association football. In 2011, Maudy reprised her role as Wahyuni in the film Garuda di Dadaku 2 and appeared in Hanny R. Saputra's Love Story.

Maudy was cast as Inggit Garnasih in Hanung Bramantyo's 2013 film Soekarno, a biopic of Indonesia's first president. Regarding her casting as Sukarno's wife, Maudy described Inggit as her role model, being an extraordinary woman who had stood faithfully by his side and made many sacrifices. For her performance, Maudy was nominated for the Citra Award for Best Actress at the 2014 Indonesian Film Festival and Best Actress at the Maya Awards and Bandung Film Festival. Though she received none of these, she won Best Supporting Actress at the Indonesian Movie Awards.

In the mid-2010s, Maudy appeared in several films, including Negeri Van Oranje ('The Land of the Van Oranjes', 2015), Pinky Promise (2016), and A Note to God (2017). She revisited the character of Zaenab for three films: Si Doel the Movie (2018), Si Doel the Movie 2 (2019), and Akhir Kisah Cinta Si Doel ('The End of Doel's Love Story', 2020). The Tempo Film Festival nominated her for Best Actress for her role in Ave Maryam (2019). At the 2022 Indonesian Film Festival, she received a Citra Award for Best Actress nomination for her role in the film Losmen Bu Broto ('Ms. Broto's Hostel', 2021). In theatre, she reprised the role of Inggit Garnasih in a series of performances in 2021.

During the 2024 Jakarta gubernatorial election, Maudy joined the campaign team for Pramono Anung and his running mate Rano Karno; the latter had been her co-star in the Si Doel television series and films. Although she later left the team, she endorsed the pair. She has remained active with the Abang None Foundation. In 2025, she appeared in five films.

== Personal life ==
Maudy married Frederik Johannes Meijer in 2001. Shortly after their marriage, the Indonesian infotainment industry instituted a "Maudy pregnancy watch", and the couple dismissed inquiries with the response "Erik is pregnant but Maudy isn’t yet". Their only son, Eddy Maliq Meijer, was born in 2007. As of 2024, the family lives in Bali.

== Filmography ==
As of 2026, Maudy has appeared in more than 25 theatrical films.

- Berbagi Suami ('Love for Share', 2006) – Talk Show Host
- Betina ('She-Beast', 2006)
- Garuda di Dadaku ('Garuda in My Chest', 2009) – Wahyuni
- Garuda di Dadaku 2 ('Garuda in My Chest 2', 2011) – Wahyuni
- Love Story (2011) – Galih's mother
- Soekarno (2013) – Inggit Garnasih
- Negeri Van Oranje ('The Land of the Van Oranjes', 2015) – Lintang's mother
- Pinky Promise (2016)
- Satu Hari Nanti ('One Day', 2017) – Chorina's mother
- Surat Kecil untuk Tuhan ('A Note to God', 2017) – Soraya
- Si Doel the Movie (2018) – Zaenab
- Iqro: My Universe (2019) – Tsurayya
- Si Doel the Movie 2 (2019) – Zaenab
- Dilan 1991 (2019) – Aunt Anis
- Keluarga Cemara ('Cemara's Family', 2019) – Aunt Pressier
- Ave Maryam (2019) – Maryam
- Akhir Kisah Cinta Si Doel ('The End of Doel's Love Story', 2020) – Zaenab
- Losmen Bu Broto ('Mrs. Broto's Hostel', 2021) – Mrs. Broto
- Nussa (2021) – Jonni's mother (voice role)
- Pelangi Tanpa Warna ('A Colourless Rainbow', 2022) – Kirana
- Merindu Cahaya de Amstel ('Longing for Light in Amstel', 2022) – Kamala's mother
- Sri Asih (2022) – Dewi Asih
- Ranah 3 Warna ('A Land in Three Colours', 2022) – Alif's mother
- Agape: The Unconditional Love (2025) – Sania
- Believe: Takdir, Mimpi, Keberanian ('Believe: Faith, Dreams, Courage', 2025) – Evi's mother
- Assalamu'alaikum Baitullah ('Peace Be With You, House of God', 2025) – Amira's mother
- Bunga Semerah Darah ('A Flower Red as Blood', 2025) – Den Bei Hardjo's wife
- 1 Kakak 7 Ponakan ('A Brother and Seven Siblings', 2025) – Agnes

== Works cited ==
- Emond, Bruce (16 January 2009). "Maudy Koesnaedi: Staying on the level". The Jakarta Post. Archived from the original on 22 October 2026.
- "Filmografi Maudy Kusuaria Koesnaedi" [Filmography for Maudy Kusuaria Koesnaedi]. filmindonesia.or.id (in Indonesian). Konfiden Foundation. Archived from the original on 22 October 2026.
- "Maudy Kusuaria Koesnaedi". filmindonesia.or.id (in Indonesian). Konfiden Foundation. Archived from the original on 22 October 2026.
- "Penghargaan Maudy Kusuaria Koesnaedi" [Awards for Maudy Kusuaria Koesnaedi]. filmindonesia.or.id (in Indonesian). Konfiden Foundation. Archived from the original on 22 October 2026.
- "Maudy Koesnaedi "Berjodoh" dengan Inggit" [Maudy Koesnaedi 'Paired' with Inggit] (in Indonesian). 18 August 2014. Archived from the original on 22 October 2026.
- "Maudy Koesnaedi Produser Abang–None" [Maudy Koesnaedi, Producer of the Abang and None]. Tempo. Vol. 38, no. 13. 18 May 2009. p. 135.
- Pratama, Febriyantino Nur (8 June 2018). "Kuliah Sempat Tertunda karena Karier, Maudy Koesnaedi Lebih Bersyukur" [Her Studies at Times Delayed by Her Career, Maudy Koesnaedi Is More Grateful]. Detik.com (in Indonesian). Archived from the original on 25 August 2026.
- "Profil Maudy Koesnaedi" [Profile of Maudy Koesnaedi]. Viva (in Indonesian). Archived from the original on 22 October 2026.
- Rachman, Myesha Fatina RACHMAN; Saputra, I Eka Yudha (8 September 2024). "'Zaenab' Dukung Pramono Anung–Rano Karno di Pilkada Jakarta 2024, Profil Maudy Koesnaedi" ['Zaenab' Supports Pramono Anung–Rano Karno in the 2024 Jakarta Gubernatorial Election]. Tempo. Archived from the original on 22 October 2026.
- Suhendra, Ichsan (5 June 2021). "Cerita Maudy Koesnadi Kembali Perankan Istri Soekarno" [The Story of How Maudy Koesnadi Returned to Play Sukarno's Wife]. Viva (in Indonesian). Archived from the original on 20 October 2026.
