= Benyamin Sueb =

Indonesian comedian, actor, and singer (1939–1995)

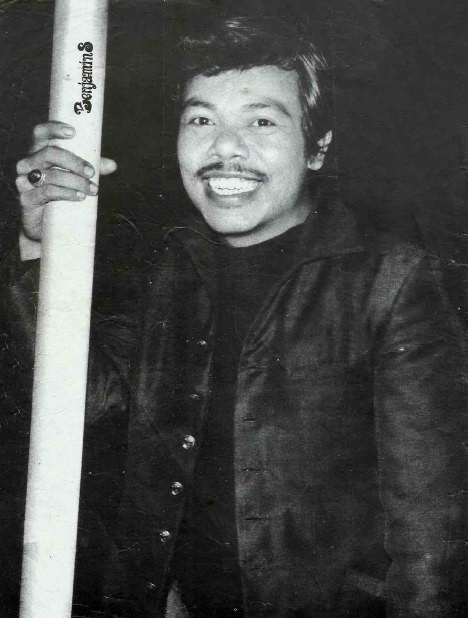
- Sueb in 1971
- Born: 5 March 1939; Batavia, Dutch East Indies
- Died: 5 September 1995 (aged 56); Jakarta, Indonesia
- Occupations: Actor; comedian; director; singer
- Spouses: Noni (m. 1959; div. 1981) (Note: They divorced in 1979 and reconciled in the same year, but divorced again in 1981.) Alfiah (m. 1983)
- Children: 9 (including Biem Benyamin)
- Parents: Suaeb (father); Aisyah (mother)
- Awards: Citra Award for Best Leading Actor: 1973 Intan Berduri; 1977 Si Doel Anak Modern

Benyamin Sueb (5 March 1939 – 5 September 1995) was an Indonesian comedian, actor and singer. He released 46 studio albums and starred in more than 50 films. He received two Citra Awards for Intan Berduri in 1973 and Si Doel Anak Modern in 1977.

== Early life ==
Benyamin was born in Kemayoran, Batavia, on 5 March 1939. His parents were Suaeb and Aisyah. His father's real name was Sukirman but changed to Suaeb since he lived in Batavia. At the age of two, Benyamin's father died. Later on, he was permitted to be a street performer. In 1946, he studied at Bendungan Jago Elementary School. When he was in the fifth or sixth grade, he moved to Santo Yusuf Elementary School in Bandung. After graduating, he continued his studies at Taman Madya Cikini Junior High School, and then Taman Siswa Senior High School in Kemayoran. Later, he studied at the Jakarta Academy of Banking for a year but did not complete his studies. He initially wanted to become a pilot, but his mother forbade him; he eventually got employment as a bread seller, and then as a bus conductor.

== Career ==
=== Music ===
In the 1950s, Benyamin joined the Melody Boys, who played calypso music, rhumba, cha-cha, jazz, blues, rock n roll, and some keroncong. The band performed some famous songs including "When I Fall in Love", "Blue Moon" and "Unchained Melody". They also performed their songs, like "Kisah Cinta" ("Love Story"), "Panon Hideung" ("Black Eye"), and "Si Neneng". He also played jazz with Jack Lemmers and Bill Saragih. In 1963, the Melody Boys changed their name to Melodi Ria. In the late 1960s, several songs that were composed by him were sung by Bing Slamet, including "Nonton Bioskop" ("Watching a Movie at the Theatre"), "Hujan Gerimis" ("Drizzle"), "Endeng-Endengan" and "Ada-Ada Saja" ("It is What it is"). From the late 1960s until the early 1970s, he was influenced by John Mayall & The Bluesbreakers' blues and James Brown's soul. In 1977, Benyamin wrote "Pungli", a critical song to the government.

In 1992, he formed a new group named Al-Haj. The band released the album Biang Kerok. In "Ampunan" ("Forgiveness"), he sang seriously. However, in "I'm a Teacher" and "Kisah Kucing Tua" ("Story of an Old Cat") he sang humorously. Style-wise, "Dingin-Dingin Dimandiin" ("Cold when Bathed") is rock. "Ampunan" was influenced by Genesis' Watcher of the Skies. The album was also influenced by The Beatles' "Lady Madonna".

Benyamin used music as a medium of reflection and contemplation, to critique the current socio-political situation. His music is a portrait of the marginal. Many of his used the theme of the "tukang" (meaning handyman in Indonesian), such as "Tukang Solder", "Tukang Becak", and "Tukang Kredit". His musical style was various. He used some blues, soul, and funk music in his works. Other genres he used in his songs were rock music, pop music, and dangdut.

=== Film ===
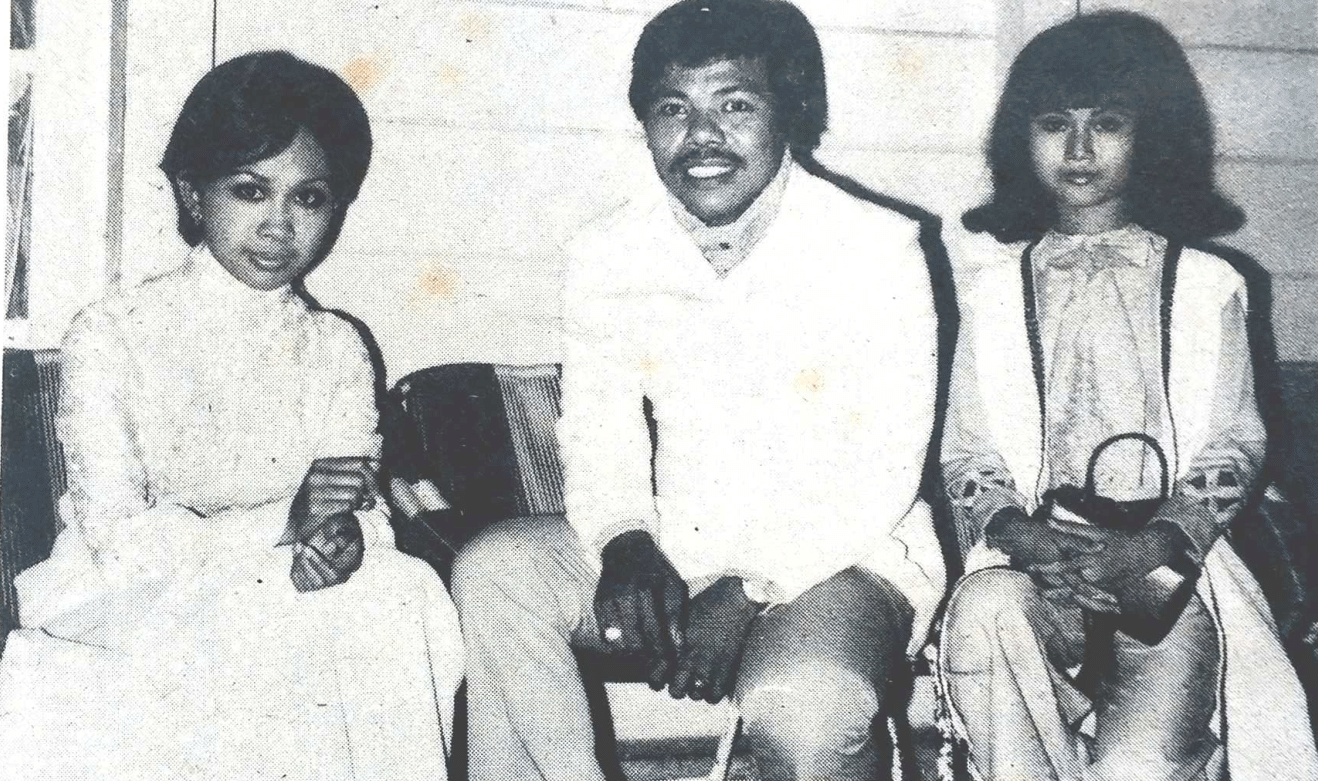
Benyamin (center) in 1974

In 1970, Benyamin made his debut in Banteng Betawi. In 1972, he starred in his eighth film as Jamal, the main character in Intan Berduri. He was paired with Rima Melati. In 1973, he collaborated with Bing Slamet on Ambisi (Ambition) and Bing Slamet Setan Djalanan (Bing Slamet the Street Demon). He also collaborated with Sjumandjaja on Si Doel Anak Betawi. After starring in Si Doel Anak Betawi, he appeared in the sequel, Si Doel Anak Modern in 1975.

As a producer, he formed the movie company Jiung Film, which created Musuh Bebuyutan (Arch-Nemesis; 1974), Benyamin Koboi Ngungsi (Benjamin the Refugee Cowboy; 1975) and Hippies Lokal (Local Hippies; 1976). He also starred in eleven films which featured his name in the title, including Benyamin Biang Kerok (1972), Benyamin Brengsek (Benyamin the Asshole; 1973) and Benyamin Jatuh Cinta (Benyamin Falls in Love; 1976).

In the 1980s, after releasing Betty Bencong Slebor (Betty, the Frightful Transvestite), he decided to stop producing his films and closed his movie company due to his revenues being less than production costs.

He played in more than 53 films, as the main character or a supporting character.

== Death ==
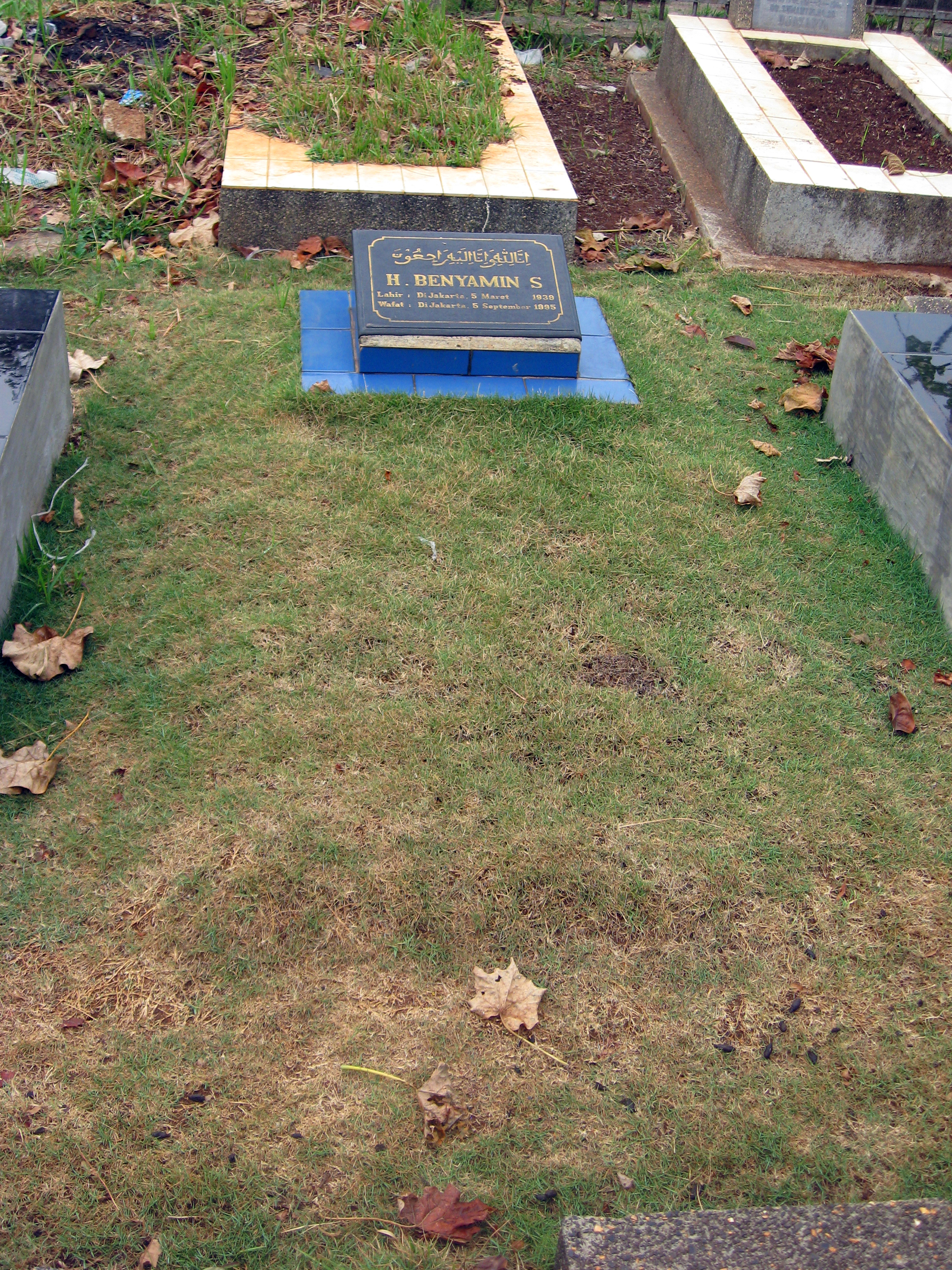
Sueb's grave at Karet Bivak Cemetery in Jakarta

6 Months after his 56th birthday, He died of a heart attack on 5 September 1995 after playing football.

== Personal life ==
In 1959, Benyamin married Noni. He proposed to her but was rejected by her stepfather. After that, he proposed to Noni's biological father and was accepted. One year later, Beib, his first son was born. On 7 July 1979, he divorced Noni and reconciled in the same year, but this did not last long because in 1981 they divorced again. In 1983, He remarried to Alfiah.

== Awards ==
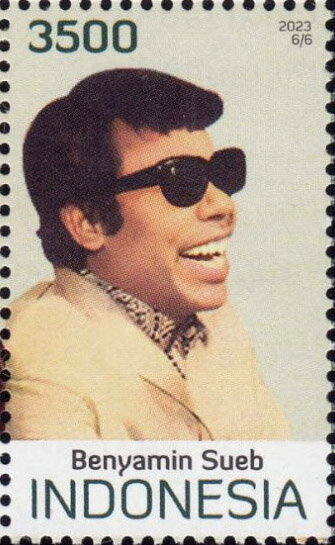
Sueb on a 2023 stamp of Indonesia

In 1973, Benyamin received a Citra Award for Intan Berduri. In 1977, he won another for Si Doel Anak Modern. In 1995, he received a special award from the committee of Festival Sinetron Indonesia for his contribution to the development of Indonesian soap operas.

Benyamin was celebrated in a Google Doodle on 22 September 2020, on the occasion of the commemoration of a park with his name in East Jakarta.

- Indonesia:
  - Star of Mahaputera, 5th Class - (25 August 2025)
  - Star of Budaya Parama Dharma – (8 November 2011)

== Awards and nominations ==
| Year | Award | Category | Recipients | Result |
|---|---|---|---|---|
| 1973 | Indonesian Film Festival | Citra Award for Best Leading Actor | Intan Berduri | Won |
| 1977 | Indonesian Film Festival | Citra Award for Best Leading Actor | Si Doel Anak Modern | Won |

== Discography ==
- Kancil Kesasar/Kue Onde (A Mousedeer Who Got Lost / Onde Cake; Mesra Records)
- Si Jampang (Melodi Record)
- Oom Senang (Happy Uncle; Mesra Record)
- Brang Breng Brong (Diamond Record)
- Jangkrik Genggong (Barking Cricket; Mutiara Record)
- Apollo (Indah Records)
- Tukang Tuak (Tuak Seller; Undah Records)
- Nonton Pecoen (Watching Dragon Boats Race; Remaco)
- Keluarga Gila (Crazy Family; Remaco)
- Tukang Sado (Caravan Man; Remaco)
- Tukang Becak (Pedicab Driver; Remaco)
- Terus Turun (Keep Going Down; Remaco)
- Steambath (Remaco)
- Dul-Dul Tjak (Mutiara Records)
- Patjaran (Dating; Indah Records)
- Ngupi (Having Coffee; Remaco)
- Nyari Kutu (Looking for Mites; Indah Records)
- Tukang Loak (Seller of Second-hand goods; Indah Records)
- Ngibing (Dance; J&B)
- Maredel (Remaco)
- Mak Minta Makan Mak (Mom, Food Please Mom; Remaco)
- Anak Sekarang (Children Nowadays; Remaco)
- Blues Kejepit Pintu (Caught in the Door Blues; Remaco)
- Bul Bul Efendi (Irama Tara, Dunia Terbalik Pop Betawi Records, Benyamin S/Ida Royani Album)
- Kicir-Kicir (Fan; Remaco)
- Asal Nguap (Yawning Indiscriminately; Indah Records)
- Makan (Eat; Remaco)
- Main Congklak (Playing Congklak; Irama Tara)
- Ketemu Bayi Tabung (Meeting an In Vitro Baby; Irama Tara)
- Soraya (Fila Records)
- Telepon Cinta (Telephone of Love; Insan Record/RCA)
- Martabak (Insan Record)
- Ngibing Betawi ( Betawi's Dance; Varia Nada Utama)
- Cintaku Berat di Ongkos (My Love is Heavy on the Cost; Virgo Ramayana Records)
- Assoy (Attractive; Ben's Records)
- Duit (Money; Mutiara Records)
- Bayi Tabung (In Vitro Baby; Insan Records)
- Mat Codet (Irama Asia)
- Tua-Tua Komersiel (Old but Commercial; Gesit Records)
- Saya Bilang (I Say; Abadi Records)
- Telepon Umum (Public Telephone; Purnama Records)
- Belajar Membaca (Learning to Read; Irama Asia)
- Nostalgila (Crazy Nostalgia; Asia Records)
- Sang Kodok (The Frog; BBB)
- Biang Kerok featuring Al-Haj (Provocateur; Virgo Ramayana/Ben's Records)
- Panglima Badul (Commander Badul)

== Endorsements ==
- Kamera Modern 280S (1978)
- Mitsubishi Delica / Colt T-120 (1979)
- Mitsubishi Colt T120SS with Ateng, Dony Damara, Melly Manuhutu (1991)
- King Kong (1994)
- Neo Rheumacyl (1995)

== General sources ==
- Badil, Rudy; et al. (2010). Main-Main Jadi Bukan Main. Jakarta: Kepustakaan Populer Gramedia. ISBN 978-979-9102-88-1.
- Ginting, Asrat; et al. (2009). Musisiku. Jakarta: Republika. ISBN 978-979-1102-52-0.
- Imanjaya, Ekky (2006). A to Z About Indonesian Film. Bandung: Dar! Mizan. ISBN 978-979-752-367-1.
- Iskandar, Salman (2009). Ramadhan, Dadan; Suryani, Yani (eds.). 99 Tokoh Muslim Indonesia. Bandung: Dar! Mizan. ISBN 978-979-752-682-5.
- Wahyuni (2007). Djakababa, Nelden (ed.). Kompor Mleduk Benyamin S.: Perjalanan Karya Legenda Seni Pop Indonesia. Jakarta: Hikmah. ISBN 978-979-1140-75-1.

Cause of Death Heart attack after playing football
