= Pacar =

Pacar is a surname. Notable people with the surname include:

- Johnny Pacar (born June 6, 1981), American author
- Janko Pacar (born 18 August 1990), Swiss football forward
