= List of films of the Dutch East Indies =

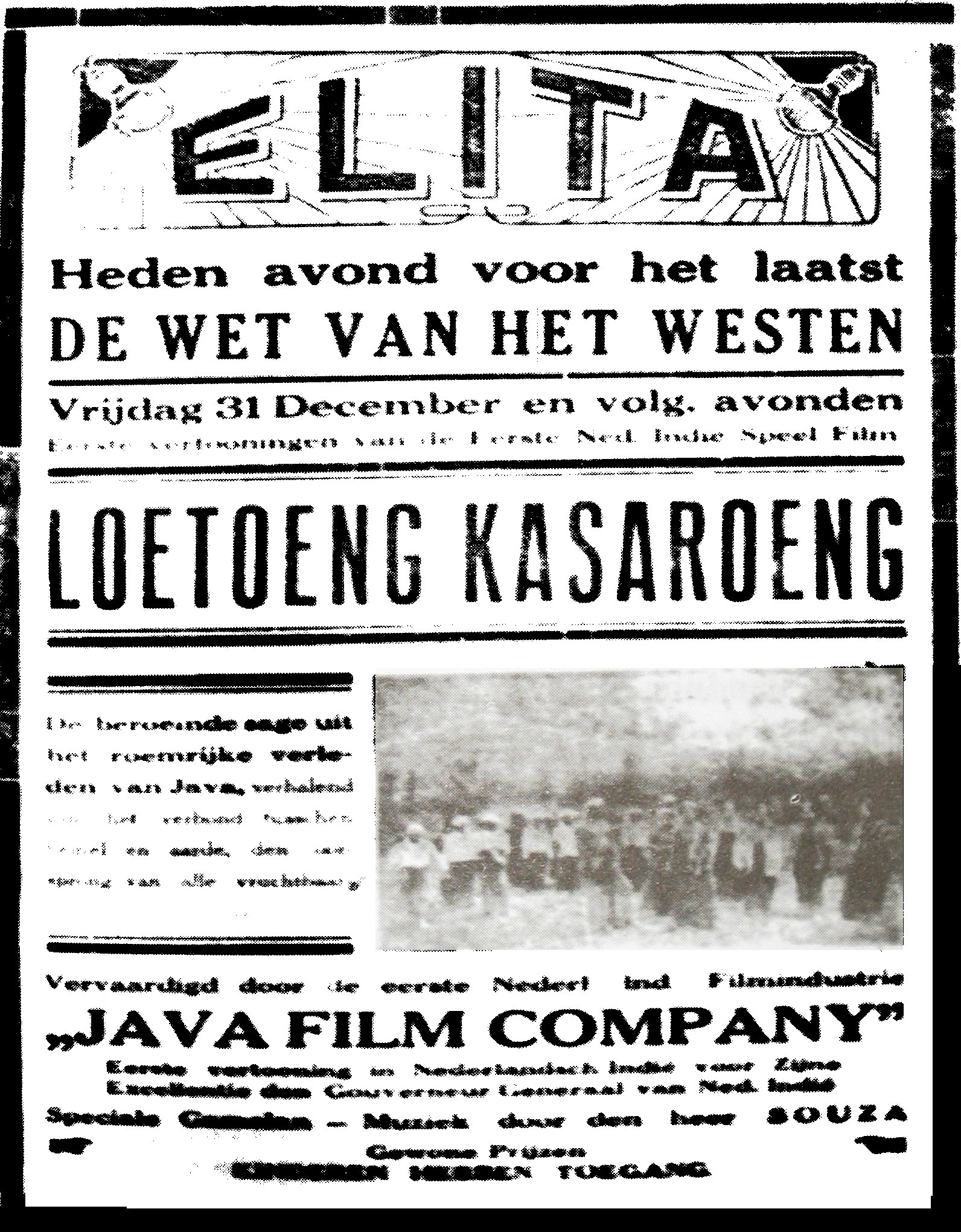
Film poster for Loetoeng Kasaroeng, the first locally produced film released in the Dutch East Indies

A total of 112 fictional films are known to have been produced in the Dutch East Indies (modern-day Indonesia) between 1926 and the colony's dissolution in 1949. The earliest motion pictures, imported from abroad, were shown in late 1900, and by the early 1920s imported serials and fictional films were being shown, often with localised names. Dutch companies were also producing documentary films about the Indies to be shown in the Netherlands. The first reports of fictional film production in the Indies date from 1923, although the work in question was not completed. The first locally produced film, Loetoeng Kasaroeng, was directed by L. Heuveldorp and released on 31 December 1926.

Between 1926 and 1933 numerous other local productions were released. Although Dutchmen like Heuveldorp and George Krugers continued to be active in the industry, the majority of filmmakers and producers were ethnic Chinese. The Tan brothers (Khoen Yauw and Khoen Hian) and The Teng Chun were major producers during this period, while the Wong brothers (Nelson, Othniel, and Joshua) were among the more prominent directors. During the mid-1930s, production dropped as a result of the Great Depression. The release of Albert Balink's commercially and critically successful Terang Boelan (Full Moon) in 1937 led to renewed interest in filmmaking, and 1941 saw thirty locally produced films. This rate of production declined after the Japanese occupation beginning in early 1942, closing all but one film studio; this resulted in several films which had begun production in 1941 being released several years later. The majority of films produced during the occupation were short propaganda pieces. Following the Proclamation of Indonesian Independence in 1945 and during the ensuing revolution several films were made, by both pro-Dutch and pro-Indonesian backers; the Dutch formally recognised Indonesia's sovereignty on 27 December 1949, leaving the Dutch East Indies defunct.

Generally films produced in the Indies dealt with traditional stories or were adapted from existing works. The early films were silent, with Karnadi Anemer Bangkong (Karnadi the Frog Contractor; 1930) generally considered the first talkie; later films would be in Dutch, Malay, or an indigenous language. All were black-and-white. (Note: The first colour film produced completely in Indonesia, Wim Umboh's Sembilan, came in 1967.)

According to the Indonesian film scholar Misbach Yusa Biran, the films released during this period could not be classified as truly Indonesian films as there was no sense of nationalism within them. The American visual anthropologist Karl G. Heider writes that all films from before 1950 are lost. However, JB Kristanto's Katalog Film Indonesia (Indonesian Film Catalogue) records several as having survived at Sinematek Indonesia's archives, and Biran writes that several Japanese propaganda films have survived at the Netherlands Government Information Service.

== Pre-independence ==
Key
†	Indicates uncertain year of production

Title	Year	Director	Cast	Synopsis	Ref(s).
Loetoeng Kasaroeng	1926	L. Heuveldorp	Martoana, Oemar	Purbararang teases her sister as the latter is dating a monkey. However, it is actually magical and, in its human form, more handsome than Purbararang's lover.	
Eulis Atjih	1927	George Krugers	Arsad, Soekria	A man leaves his beautiful young wife Eulis Atjih and their child to lead a life of partying. She falls into poverty and, when he returns several years later, he is also poor.	
Lily van Java	1928	Nelson Wong	Lie Lian Hoa, Lie Bouw Tan, Kwee Tiang An, Yah Kwee Pang	The daughter of a rich man is forced to marry a person she does not love and secretly has a relationship with another man.	
Resia Boroboedoer	1928	Unknown	Olive Young	A Chinese woman follows a book to Borobudur temple to search for the ashes of Gautama Buddha. Upon failing, she becomes an ascetic.	
Setangan Berloemoer Darah	1928	Unknown	Unknown	Tan Hian Beng looks for his father's killer and has his vengeance using martial arts.	
Njai Dasima	1929	Lie Tek Swie	Nurhani, Anah, Wim Lender, Momo	Dasima, the mistress of a rich Englishman, is tricked into leaving him and her daughter by a greedy couple.	
Rampok Preanger	1929	Nelson Wong	Ining Resmini, MS Ferry	Unknown	
Si Tjonat	1929	Nelson Wong	May Ku Fung, Herman Sim	Tjonat escapes from Batavia after killing one of his friends. He tries to kidnap his love interest, Lie Gouw Nio, but is stopped by Thio Sing Sang.	
Karnadi Anemer Bangkong	1930	George Krugers	Unknown	A comedy following the exploits of a young frog hunter named Karnadi	
Lari ke Arab	1930	Wong brothers	Ining Resmini, Oemar	A ne'er-do-well Javanese man tries to escape the realities of the Great Depression by running away to Mecca.	
Nancy Bikin Pembalesan	1930	Lie Tek Swie	Unknown	Dasima's daughter Nancy returns to the Dutch East Indies in a quest to avenge her mother's death. This leads to the murderers' deaths.	
Njai Dasima	1930	Lie Tek Swie	Nurhani, Anah, Wim Lender, Momo	Dasima, the former mistress of a rich Englishman, lives with the greedy couple that tricked her. When she realises that they have been dishonest, they have her killed.	
De Stem des Bloeds (alternatively, Njai Siti)	1930	Ph. Carli	Annie Krohn, Sylvain Boekebinder, Vally Lank	Siti awaits her lover's return. However, when he comes he cannot find her. He is able to unite with the family after his stepdaughter unwittingly falls in love with her half-brother.	
Si Ronda	1930	Lie Tek Swie	Bachtiar Effendi, Momo	An action film based on a previously existing work	
Boenga Roos dari Tjikembang	1931	The Teng Chun	Unknown	Oh Ay Ceng is forced to marry a rich girl. Their daughter becomes engaged but dies before marriage. Her fiancé then marries Oh's daughter from his former lover.	
Huwen op Bevel (alternatively, Terpaksa Menika)	1931	George Krugers	Unknown	An Indonesian intellectual falls in love with a woman, who is told to marry someone else.	
Indonesia Malaise	1931	Wong brothers	MS Ferry, Oemar	A young woman is forced to marry a man she does not love. He leaves her and her lover is imprisoned, making her depressed. She recovers when her lover is released.	
Melati van Agam	1931	Lie Tek Swie	A. Rachman, Neng Titi, Oemar, Bachtiar Effendi	Norma loves Idrus but is forced to marry a rich man. Idrus falls ill and dies, and, several years later, Norma goes to Idrus' grave and commits suicide. (in two parts)	
Sam Pek Eng Tay	1931	The Teng Chun	Unknown	Based on a Chinese legend. Eng Tay and Sam Pek are in love, but are separated. She is sequestered and Sam Pek is killed; Eng Tay throws herself upon his grave.	
Si Pitoeng	1931	Wong brothers	Herman Sim, Ining Resmini, Zorro	Si Pitung, a bandit from Batavia, faces wits with the Dutch constable A.W.V. Hinne.	
Sarinah	1931	Ph. Carli	Annie Krohn	A romance set on the south coast of Java	
Sinjo Tjo Main di Film (alternatively, Tjo Speelt Voor de Film)	1931	M. H. Schilling	M. H. Schilling, Ida Schilling	A comedy based on the Schillings' radio work in Bandung	(Note: A short film)
Karina's Zelfopoffering (alternatively, Pengorbanan Karina)	1932	Ph. Carli	Annie Krohn	Details the life of Raden Ajeng Karina, a woman of mixed-descent who lives in the palace at Yogyakarta	
Njai Dasima	1932	Bachtiar Effendi	Momo, Oesman	Dasima is tricked into leaving her lover and daughter by a greedy couple. When she realises that they have been dishonest, she is killed.	
Zuster Theresia	1932	M. H. Schilling	M. H. Schilling, Daisy Diephuis, Henk Maschhaup, Alle Heymann	Henk works in Bandung and marries his boss' daughter. Henk calls Flora to help raise his child, but she goes to a nunnery when Daisy becomes a better mother.	
Pat Bie To† (alternatively, Delapan Wanita Tjantik)	1933	The Teng Chun	Unknown	A martial arts story	
Pat Kiam Hap† (alternatively, Delapan Djago Pedang)	1933	The Teng Chun	Unknown	A martial arts story	
Ouw Peh Tjoa (alternatively, Doea Siloeman Uler Puti en Item)	1934	The Teng Chun	Unknown	Based on a Chinese legend. A man marries a snake disguised as a woman. When the snake is discovered, she is caught but not killed as she is pregnant.	
Ang Hai Djie	1935	The Teng Chun	Unknown	Unknown	
Pan Sie Tong†	1935	The Teng Chun	Unknown	Unknown	
Poei Sie Giok Pa Loei Tay	1935	Unknown	Unknown	Poei Sie Giok, trained in martial arts since he was a child, defeats the master Loei Lo Ho, Loei's students, and Loei's wife.	
Tie Pat Kai Kawin (alternatively, Siloeman Babi Perang Siloeman Monjet)	1935	The Teng Chun	Unknown	The pig demon Tie Pat Kai marries a human woman. When her father drives him out, Tie kidnaps his wife and escapes. He is hunted down by two monks.	
Anaknja Siloeman Oeler Poeti	1936	The Teng Chun	Unknown	A sequel to Ouw Phe Tjoa. The child of the white snake and her human husband looks for its mother.	
Lima Siloeman Tikoes†	1936	The Teng Chun	Unknown	A woman, aided by a cat demon, must discover which person is her husband and which is actually five mouse demons passing as him.	
Pareh	1936	Mannus Franken, Albert Balink	Roegaya, E. T. Effendi, Doenaesih, Rd Mochtar	Mahmud, a fisherman, is in love with Wagini, a farmer's daughter. However, local superstition dictates that their relationship will bring disaster.	
Pembakaran Bio "Hong Lian Sie" (alternatively, Moesnanja Gowa Siloeman Boeaja Poeti)	1936	The Teng Chun	Unknown	The gang of Kuen Luen Pai fights against that of Oen Kung Pai after a ship containing weapons is destroyed.	
Gadis jang Terdjoeal	1937	The Teng Chun	Unknown	Han Nio is sold to a rich man as his wife. They live unhappily and eventually Han dies. Her former lover tries to take revenge against the husband but is killed.	
Terang Boelan (alternatively, Het Eilan der Droomen)	1937	Albert Balink	Rd Mochtar, Roekiah, E. T. Effendi	Rohaya is in love but forced to marry a man she does not love. She elopes but is caught. Her lover wins her back by fighting.	
Fatima	1938	Joshua Wong, Othniel Wong	Kartolo, E. T. Effendi, Rd Mochtar, Roekiah	Fatima is in love with Idris, but the rich youth Ali tries to steal her. He is later arrested as the leader of a gang of bandits.	
Oh Iboe†	1938	The Teng Chun	Lo Tjin Nio, Bissoe	A widower remarries and focuses on gambling, while his business is run by the dishonest Kian Hwat. His daughter Loan regains the family wealth after Kian steals it.	
Tjiandjoer†	1938	The Teng Chun	Lo Tjin Nio, Bissoe	The spoiled Kim Tjiang has his brother Kim Djin exiled from home, but their father Koan Liong later realises his mistake.	
Alang-Alang	1939	The Teng Chun	Hadidjah, Mohamad Mochtar, Bissoe, Lena, Moesa	Suhiyat is in love with Surati, but she is kidnapped. Suhiyat eventually rescues her.	
Gagak Item	1939	Joshua Wong, Othniel Wong	Kartolo, Roekiah, Rd Mochtar	A bandit film, based on Zorro	
Impian di Bali†	1939	Unknown	Unknown	A couple travel through Bali. Includes comedic acts and music.	
Roesia si Pengkor (alternatively, Hadji Saleh)	1939	The Teng Chun	Da'ing, Bissoe, Hadidjah	Suti is left with her mother while her father leaves town. She is courted by several boys, including the one she loves. The two marry after overcoming the other suitors.	
Dasima	1940	Tan Tjoei Hock	S Soekarti, Mohamad Mochtar, M Sani, S Talib	Dasima divorces from her husband then marries Samiun. Samiun spends her money on gambling and, she asks for it back, he has her killed.	
Harta Berdarah	1940	R Hu, Rd Ariffien	Soelastri, Zonder, RS Fatimah, Moesa	A rich man leaves his community in suffering while a young couple try to make their way. Eventually the rich man sees the negative influences of money.	
Kartinah	1940	Andjar Asmara	Ratna Asmara, Astaman, RA Tjokrohandoko, M Rasjid Manggis	Suria's wife Titi has memory problems. Suria falls in love with her nurse Kartinah and, after Titi dies in an air raid, marries her.	
Kedok Ketawa	1940	Jo An Djan	Basoeki Resobowo, Oedjang, RS Fatimah	Marsinah and Basuki fall in love and are protected from thugs by "The Laughing Mask"	
Kris Mataram	1940	Njoo Cheong Seng	Fifi Young, Omar Rodriga	The noble R.A. Rusmini is in love with the commoner Bachtiar, but their love faces heavy opposition by traditional groups.	
Matjan Berbisik	1940	Tan Tjoei Hock	Hadidjah, Mohamad Mochtar, Bissoe, Said	Hamid's father goes away and does not return until after his son is fully grown. By this time, Hamid and his caretaker's son are in competition for a young woman's love.	
Melati van Agam	1940	Tan Tjoei Hock	S Soekarti, AB Rachman, R Abdullah, S Thalib	Siti Norma marries a man she does not love out of respect for her parents, but then elopes with her lover Idrus.	
Rentjong Atjeh	1940	The Teng Chun	Dewi Mada, Ferry Kock, Mohamad Mochtar, Hadidjah	Two youths, Rusna and Daud, receive training to hunt and kill a pirate who left them orphans fifteen years prior.	
Roekihati	1940	Joshua Wong, Othniel Wong	Rd Djoemala, Roekiah, Kartolo, Annie Landouw	Roekihati is married to Mansur. He begins to stray when he meets Aminah, but as Roekihati is ever-faithful he returns to her.	
Siti Akbari	1940	Joshua Wong, Othniel Wong	Annie Landouw, Kartolo, Rd Mochtar, Roekiah	Siti Akbari's husband cheats on her, but eventually she finds happiness.	
Sorga Ka Toedjoe	1940	Joshua Wong, Othniel Wong	Rd Djoemala, Roekiah, Kartolo, Annie Landouw	Kasimin and Hadidjah, long-separated spouses, are reunited after the efforts of Hadidjah's niece Rasminah and her lover Hoesin.	
Zoebaida	1940	Njoo Cheong Seng	Fifi Young, Soerip, Aisah, Sally Young	A love story set in Timor	
Air Mata Iboe	1941	Njoo Cheong Seng	Fifi Young, Rd Ismail, Ali Joego, Soerip	Sumadi takes vengeance on his siblings after they refuse to shelter their mother, Sugiati, after their father dies.	
Ajah Berdosa	1941	Wu Tsun	M Arief, S Waldy, Elly Joenara, Soetijem	A man is tempted by a "modern" city woman and leaves his wife and son, only to find misfortune.	
Aladin dengan Lampoe Wasiat	1941	Wong brothers	Elly Joenara, Benny, Wolly Sutinah	The poor youth Aladin falls in love with a princess and defeats the evil grand vizier.	
Asmara Moerni	1941	Rd Ariffien	AK Gani, Djoewariah, S. Joesoef	A doctor falls in love with his maid, only to marry her after her fiancé dies.	
Bajar dengan Djiwa	1941	R Hu	A Bakar, Itjang Ali, Haroen, Oesman	A drama following the interactions between several families, including the philanthropist Basuki and the ne'er-do-well Umar	
Boedjoekan Iblis	1941	Jo An Djan	Rd Mochtar, E. T. Effendi, Anwar, Dewi Radiah	Unknown	
Djantoeng Hati	1941	Njoo Cheong Seng	A Sarosa, Rr Anggraini, Ariati	Two girls, the traditional Karina and modernist Roesdjana, are in competition. The film warns that modernity is not necessarily the best path.	
Elang Darat	1941	Inoe Perbatasari	Astaman, Ali Joego, Rohana, Salam	Parlan is called to Kresek to track down a bandit called Elang Darat, who is revealed to be Parlan's half-brother Gunawi.	
Garoeda Mas	1941	Jo An Djan	Rd Mochtar, Dewi Radiah, E. T. Effendi, Rd Kosasih	Unknown	
Ikan Doejoeng	1941	Lie Tek Swie	Asmanah, Soerjono, A Thys, S Poniman	Asmara is told to marry someone she does not love. She instead elopes with Sanusi and, when they are accosted by robbers, escapes into the night.	
Koeda Sembrani	1941	Wong brothers	Roekiah, Rd Djoemala, Wolly Sutinah, Kartolo	The story of a winged horse	
Lintah Darat	1941	Wu Tsun	Elly Joenara, Satijem, M Arief, Aboebakar Djoenaedi	Kumala joins forces with Safi'i to deal with a loan shark and his wife, Kumala's selfish sister Asnah.	
Matula	1941	Tan Tjoei Hock	Ferry Kock, Dewi Mada, Mohamad Mochtar, Bissoe	Matula goes to a dukun, asks to be made handsome, and is told to pay with a life. He tries to use Emma as his payment, but is stopped by her father and her fiancé.	
Moestika dari Djemar	1941	Jo An Djan	Dhalia, Rd Mochtar, Djoeriah	Unknown	
Noesa Penida	1941	Andjar Asmara	Ratna Asmara, Astaman, Rd Ismail, Ali Joego	Two brothers are in love with a princess, but differences in their castes leads to difficulty.	
Pah Wongso Pendekar Boediman	1941	Jo Eng Sek	LV Wijnhamer Jr., Elly Joenara	Barja begins a life of crime after his cousin rejects his advances, while Pah Wongso investigates his crimes.	
Pah Wongso Tersangka	1941	Wu Tsun	LV Wijnhamer Jr., Sylvia Hatjirah, S Waldy, M Sarip	Pah Wongso becomes a suspect	
Panggilan Darah	1941	Soetan Oesman Kariem	Dhalia, Soerip, Wolly Sutinah, Mochtar Widjaja	Two orphans work at the home of Iskak. When his wife mistreats them, they run away, but find out that they are related to Iskak and thus return to him.	
Pantjawarna	1941	Njoo Cheong Seng	Mochtar Widjaja, Dhalia, Idris Martha, Omar Rodriga	Described as the first musical in the Indies	
Poesaka Terpendam	1941	Unknown	Roekiah, Rd Djoemala, Titing, Kartolo	A group of people go on a search for hidden treasure.	
Poetri Rimba	1941	Inoe Perbatasari	Aisjah, Loedi, Ali Joego, Bissoe, Soetiati	Achmad is taken into a village after getting lost in the jungle. He competes against Perbada for the love of the leader's daughter.	
Ratna Moetoe Manikam	1941	Sutan Usman Karim	Ratna Asmara, Astaman, Ali Joego, Inoe Perbatasari	Two goddesses compete for the love of an earthly king.	
Selendang Delima	1941	Henry L. Duarte	Celly Young, Asmana, Soerjono	Unknown	
Si Gomar	1941	Tan Tjoei Hock	Tan Tjeng Bok, Hadidjah, Mohamad Mochtar, Bissoe	Soebardja and Mariani are separated and left orphans after robbers kill their parents. As adults they nearly marry each other, but are stopped when their cousin recognises them.	
Singa Laoet	1941	Tan Tjoei Hock	Tan Tjeng Bok, Hadidjah, Bissoe, Mohamad Mochtar	Mahmud goes against a gang of pirates led by Singa Laoet ("Lion of the Sea") to discover who killed his father twenty years earlier.	
Siti Noerbaja	1941	Lie Tek Swie	Asmanah, Momo, Soerjono, A. Thys	Sitti Nurbaya falls in love with Samsulbahri, but is forced to marry the criminal Datuk Meringgih to pay her father's debt.	
Soeara Berbisa	1941	Wu Tsun	Rd Soekarno, Ratna Djoewita, Oedjang, Soehaena	Mitra and Neng Mardinah fall in love, but the jealous Mardjohan spreads rumours that Mitra is the son of a thief. They reconcile and are revealed to be long-lost brothers.	
Sorga Palsoe	1941	Tan Tjoei Hock	Lo Tjin Nio, Hui Tong, Pun Tjiaw Lim, Rohana	Hian Nio is treated by as a servant by her mother. Her lover's boss, Bian Hong, marries her. However, she is distressed by the marriage, runs away, and dies.	
Srigala Item	1941	Tan Tjoei Hock	Tan Tjeng Bok, Hadidjah, Mohamad Mochtar, Aisah	Mochtar is forced to live with his uncle after his father disappears. The cruel uncle and his son are often accosted by a masked figure known only as De Zwarte Wolf ("The Black Wolf").	
Tengkorak Hidoep	1941	Tan Tjoei Hock	Tan Tjeng Bok, Mohamad Mochtar, Misnahati, Bissoe	Darmadji and his friends go to Mustika Island, where they witness Maha Daru being reborn after 2,000 years. They must defeat him to survive.	
Tjioeng Wanara	1941	Jo Eng Sek	R Sukran, Elly Joenara, AB Djoenaedi, M Arief	Tjioeng Wanara rebels against the cruel king of Galuh.	
Wanita dan Satria	1941	Rd Ariffien	Djoewariah, Ratna Djoewita, R Hidajat	A womaniser named Soedrajat abuses his status to gain women's trust before ultimately getting his comeuppance.	
1001 Malam	1942	Wu Tsun	Unknown	Unknown	
Boenga Sembodja	1942	Moh Said HJ	Dhalia, Mohamad Mochtar, Tossin Effendi, Anwar	Unknown	
Mega Mendoeng	1942	Boen Kim Nam	Rd Soekarno, Oedjang, Ratna Djoewita, Boen Sofiati	Kustini is betrayed by her friend Sujono, but they later reconcile.	
Poelo Inten	1942	Unknown	Mohamad Mochtar, Djoeriah, Noersani, Ramli Bapet	Unknown	
Berdjoang	1943	Rd Ariffien	Mohamad Mochtar, Sambas, Dhalia, Kartolo	Anang and Saman compete for the love of Hasanah. After Anang joins the Japanese army, Hasanah decides she wants to be with him.	
Di Desa	1943	Roestam Sutan Palindih	Mohamad Mochtar, Garkiah, Epen	Unknown	
Di Menara	1943	Roestam Sutan Palindih	Rd Soekarno, Garkiah, Epen	Unknown	
Kemakmoeran	1943	Unknown	Unknown	Unknown	
Djatoeh Berkait	1944	B. Koesoema	Astaman, Kartolo, Dimin	Unknown	
Hoedjan	1944	Inoe Perbatasari	Aboebakar Djoenaedi, Dhalia, E. T. Effendi	Unknown	
Keris Poesaka	1944	Unknown	Unknown	Unknown	
Koeli dan Romoesha	1944	Unknown	Unknown	Propaganda promoting the romusha programme	

Key
†	Indicates uncertain year of production

== Post-independence ==
Title	Year	Director	Cast	Synopsis	Ref(s).
Djaoeh Dimata	1948	Andjar Asmara	Ratna Asmara, Ali Joego, Iskandar Sucarno, Djauhari Effendi	Soelastri must go to Jakarta to earn a living after her husband Asrad goes blind.	
Anggrek Bulan	1948	Andjar Asmara	Rd Soekarno, A. Hamid Arief, Nila Djuwita, Iskandar Sucarno	Kati is in a love triangle with Atma and Subrata, but Atma has other to worry about.	
Air Mata Mengalir di Tjitarum	1948	Roestam Sutan Palindih	Sofia, S Waldy, D Ismail, Rd Endang	Unknown	
Aneka Warna	1949	Moh Said HJ	A. Hamid Arief, Mochsin, R Busono, Annie Mulya	The story of Dul Kalong and Mat Codot, two fools from the Aneka Warna troupe who live in poverty.	
Bengawan Solo	1949	Jo An Tjiang	Sofia, Rd Mochtar, Mohamad Mochtar, Rd Dadang Ismail	A village woman's two children are raised by different families after she drowns herself in the Solo River.	
Gadis Desa	1949	Andjar Asmara	Basuki Djaelani, Ratna Ruthinah, Ali Joego, Djauhari Effendi	Abu Bakar falls in love with his landlord's daughter despite having a wife.	
Harta Karun	1949	Usmar Ismail	Rd Soekarno, A. Hamid Arief, Djauhari Effendi, Herawati	Suliati and Ahmad are in love, but Suliati's father will not bless the relationship because Ahmad is poor.	
Tjitra	1949	Usmar Ismail	Rd Soekarno, Nila Djuwita, Rd Ismail, A. Hamid Arief	Harsono takes Suryani's virginity then flees to the city, where he is caught up in a murder case.	
Menanti Kasih	1949	Moh Said HJ	Chatir Harro, A. Hamid Arief, Nila Djuwita, Djoeriah	Husni Anwar discovers his schooling was paid for by Rachman, and now he must marry Rachman's daughter.	
Saputangan	1949	Fred Young	[[Pak Kasur {{{last}}}]], Chatir Harro, Noorsini, Netty Herawaty	Hardjono goes blind while at sea, but has an operation to give him back his sight.	
Sehidup Semati	1949	Fred Young	Ida Prijatni, Ali Joego, Chatir Harro, Djauhari Effendi	During a trip to Bandung Kusmayadi proposes to Asmarani despite already being betrothed to Lasminah.	

== See also ==
- List of Indonesian films
