= Singa Laoet =

1941 film by Tan Tjoei Hock

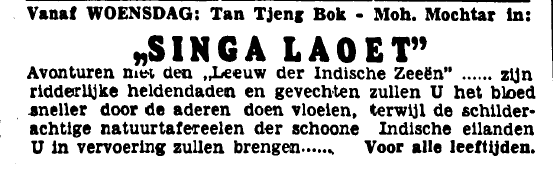
- Newspaper ad, Surabaya
- Directed by: Tan Tjoei Hock
- Screenplay by: Tan Tjoei Hock
- Produced by: The Teng Chun
- Starring: Tan Tjeng Bok; Hadidjah; Mohamad Mochtar
- Cinematography: Tan Tjoei Hock
- Production company: Action Film
- Release date: 1941 (Dutch East Indies)
- Running time: 76 minutes
- Country: Dutch East Indies
- Language: Indonesian

Singa Laoet (Perfected Spelling: Singa Laut; Indonesian for The Sea Lion or The Merlion) is a 1941 film from the Dutch East Indies (today Indonesia). Directed by Tan Tjoei Hock and produced by The Teng Chun, it starred Tan Tjen Bok, Mohamad Mochtar, and Hadidjah.

== Plot ==
Robin is exiled from society after he is accused of murdering a man named Ibrahim in a fight. Twenty years later Ibrahim's son, Mahmud, begins a search for his father's killer. He soon reaches the island of Sampojo, where he finds Robin. The exile has taken up piracy and now uses the name "Singa Laoet" (The Sea Lion). After one of Robin's men, Hasan, kidnaps a girl whom he loves, Mahmud tracks the kidnapper down and fights him to the death. It is later revealed that Hasan, not Robin, was the one who killed Ibrahim.

== Production ==
Singa Laoet was directed by Tan Tjoei Hock, a Chinese-Indonesian director who had been attached to The Teng Chun's Java Industrial Film since 1940; They produced the film for Action Film, a subsidiary of Java Industrial Film. Tan is also credited with the screenwriting, cinematography, and sound editing of this 76-minute-long black-and-white film. Production of this film was mostly finished by October 1941.

The film starred Tan Tjeng Bok, Hadidjah, Bissu, and Mohamad Mochtar. Three of the actors had extended experience with Java Industrial Film: Bissu had made his screen debut for the company in 1938's Oh Iboe, Hadidjah had joined with her husband Mas Sardi in 1939 for Roesia si Pengkor, and Mochtar had appeared in Alang-Alang later that year after being discovered in a barbershop. Tan Tjeng Bok, a former stage star with Dardanella, was a more recent hire, only having made his film debut in the company's 1941 production Srigala Item.

== Release and reception ==
Singa Laoet was released in late 1941, having reached Surabaya by November. In the city it was advertised as capable of making viewer's blood pump faster through their veins, while the panoramas of the Indies were described as picturesque and beautiful. The film was open to audiences of all ages. A reviewer in the Surabaya-based Soerabaijasch Handelsblad found that the film would likely be popular with ethnic Chinese and Native audiences.

Theatrical screenings of Singa Laoet continued as late as 1945. According to J.B. Kristanto's Katalog Film Indonesia, a 35 mm copy of the film is held at Sinematek Indonesia in Jakarta.

== Works cited ==
- Biran, Misbach Yusa (2009). Sejarah Film 1900–1950: Bikin Film di Jawa [History of Film 1900–1950: Making Films in Java] (in Indonesian). Jakarta: Komunitas Bamboo working with the Jakarta Art Council. ISBN 978-979-3731-58-2.
- "Bissu" (in Indonesian). Taman Ismail Marzuki.
- "Kredit Singa Laoet" [Credits for Singa Laoet]. filmindonesia.or.id (in Indonesian). Jakarta: Konfiden Foundation. Archived from the original on 7 March 2014.
- "Sampoerna Theater: Singa Laoet". Soerabaijasch Handelsblad (in Dutch). Surabaya. 6 November 1941. p. 8.
- "Singa Laoet". filmindonesia.or.id (in Indonesian). Jakarta: Konfiden Foundation. Archived from the original on 2 December 2013.
- "Studio Nieuws" [Studio News]. Pertjatoeran Doenia Dan Film (in Indonesian). 1 (5). Batavia: 28. October 1941.
- "(untitled)". Soerabaijasch Handelsblad (in Dutch). Surabaya. 3 November 1941. p. 7.
- "(untitled)". Tjahaja (in Indonesian). Bandung. 10 May 1945. p. 2.
