= Sorga Palsoe =

- Directed by: Tan Tjoei Hock
- Story by: Fred Young
- Starring: Lo Tjin Nio; Tong Hui; Lim Poen Tjiaw; Rohana
- Music by: Mas Sardi
- Production company: Java Industrial Film
- Release date: 1941 (Dutch East Indies)
- Country: Dutch East Indies
- Language: Indonesian

Sorga Palsoe ([ˈsɔrɡa ˈpalsu]; Indonesian for False Heaven) is a 1941 film from the Dutch East Indies (present-day Indonesia) which was directed by Tan Tjoei Hock for Java Industrial Film. The tragedy, starring Lo Tjin Nio, Tong Hui, Lim Poen Tjiaw, and Rohana, was a commercial failure. It is likely lost.

== Plot ==
Hian Nio is displeased as her mother, Roti, treats her poorly and favours her siblings. One day, Hian Nio's boyfriend Kian Bie is fired from his work. Kian Bie's former employer, Bian Hong, uses the opportunity to take Hian Nio as his wife. She is, however, unhappy, and after a year abandons Bian Hong and their newborn daughter. Eventually Hian Nio returns to claim their daughter, but she dies soon afterwards.

== Production ==
Sorga Palsoe was directed by Tan Tjoei Hock for The Teng Chun's Java Industrial Film. It was his fourth film, following Dasima, Matjan Berbisik, and Melati van Agam (all 1940). The story, which bucked a then-ongoing trend of native oriented films, was written by Fred Young; it was Young's first foray into the industry.

The film starred Lo Tjin Nio, Tong Hui, Lim Poen Tjiaw, and Rohana. Filming for the black-and-white film began on 27 December 1940 and was completed by January of the following year. Music direction was handled by Mas Sardi.

== Release and reception ==
Sorga Palsoe was screened in Surabaya, East Java, by late February 1941 and in Medan, North Sumatra, by April. The film, targeted at uneducated, lower-class viewers, was a commercial failure. An anonymous review in the daily Soerabaijasch Handelsblad found the film to have a tragic ending and emphasised the role of ethnic Chinese in production.

The film is likely lost. The American visual anthropologist Karl G. Heider writes that all Indonesian films from before 1950 are lost. However, JB Kristanto's Katalog Film Indonesia (Indonesian Film Catalogue) records several as having survived at Sinematek Indonesia's archives, and film historian Misbach Yusa Biran writes that several Japanese propaganda films have survived at the Netherlands Government Information Service.

== Works cited ==
- Biran, Misbach Yusa (2009). Sejarah Film 1900–1950: Bikin Film di Jawa [History of Film 1900–1950: Making Films in Java] (in Indonesian). Jakarta: Komunitas Bamboo working with the Jakarta Art Council. ISBN 978-979-3731-58-2.
- "Fred Young". filmindonesia.or.id (in Indonesian). Konfidan Foundation. Archived from the original on 16 December 2014.
- Heider, Karl G. (1991). Indonesian Cinema: National Culture on Screen. Honolulu: University of Hawaii Press. ISBN 978-0-8248-1367-3.
- "Mas Sardi". filmindonesia.or.id (in Indonesian). Jakarta: Konfiden Foundation. Archived from the original on 11 January 2014.
- "Sorga Palsoe". filmindonesia.or.id (in Indonesian). Jakarta: Konfiden Foundation. Archived from the original on 2 December 2013.
- "Sorga Palsoe (De Valsche Hemel)". Soerabaijasch Handelsblad (in Dutch). Surabaya: Kolff & Co. 24 February 1941. p. 6.
- "(untitled)". De Sumatra Post (in Dutch). Medan. 21 April 1941. p. 8.
- "(untitled)". Soerabaijasch Handelsblad (in Dutch). Surabaya: Kolff & Co. 22 February 1941. p. 4.
