= Sardi =

Sardi or SARDI may refer to:

== People ==
- Armando Sardi (born 1940), Italian former sprinter
- Carlos Holguín Sardi (born 1940), Colombian politician
- Giuseppe Sardi, Baroque Italian architect, active in Rome
- Giuseppe Sardi (1624–1699), Swiss-Italian sculptor and architect active in Venice, designer of the San Lazzaro dei Mendicanti monument
- Idris Sardi (1938–2014), Indonesian violinist, father of actor Lukman Sardi
- Jan Sardi (born 1953), Australian screenwriter
- José Nucete Sardi (1897–1972), Venezuelan historian, journalist and diplomat
- Lukman Sardi (born 1971), Indonesian actor, son of violinist Idris Sardi
- Orlando Sardi de Lima, current Ambassador of Colombia to Spain
- Paolo Sardi (1934–2019), Italian cardinal of the Roman Catholic Church
- Sardi (musician) (1910–1953), Indonesian musician

== Other uses ==
- Alà dei Sardi, comune (municipality) in the Province of Sassari in the Italian region Sardinia
- Sardi, Iran (disambiguation), several places
- Sardi's, Continental restaurant in Manhattan, New York City
- Sardis (Italian: Sardi), ancient city in Turkey's Manisa Province
- Sardinians or Sards (Italian: Sardi), ethnonym indicating the native people of Sardinia, Mediterranean island located southwest of Italy
- South Australian Research and Development Institute (SARDI)

== See also ==
- Sardo
- Sardis
