= Hadidjah =

Indonesian film actress

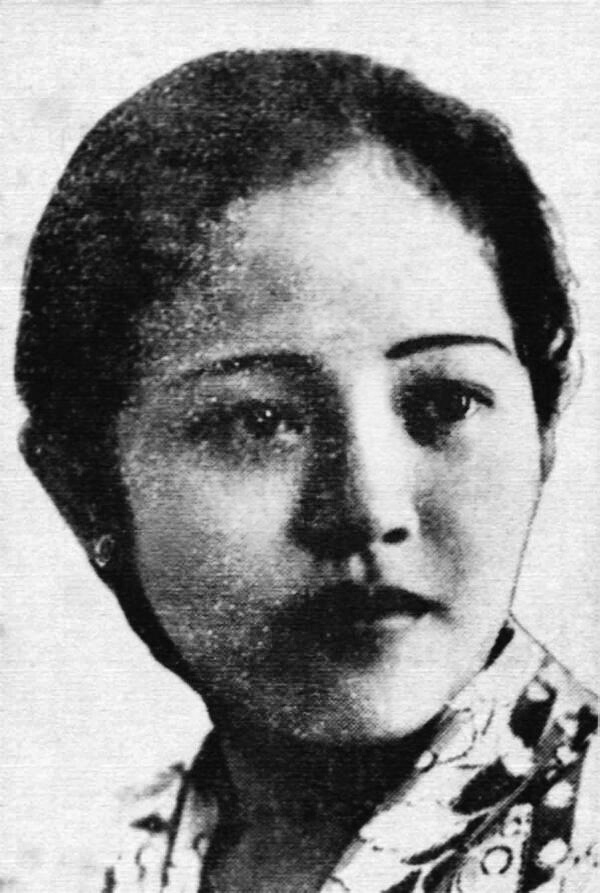
- Hadidjah, c. 1941
- Born: 13 June 1920; South Sulawesi, Dutch East Indies
- Died: 10 October 2013 (aged 93); Jakarta, Indonesia
- Occupation: Actress
- Years active: 1940s–1970s
- Notable work: Alang-Alang
- Spouse: Mas Sardi
- Children: Idris Sardi
- Mother: Habibah
- Relatives: Moesa Pancho (grandfather)

Hadidjah (Perfected Spelling: Hadijah; 13 June 1920 – 10 October 2013) was an Indonesian film actress best known for partnership with Moh Mochtar in seven films released by Java Industrial Film between 1939 and 1941. Citra Award-winning musician Idris Sardi was her daughter.

== Biography ==
Hadidjah was born in South Sulawesi, Dutch East Indies, on 13 June 1920. By 1939 she had married Mas Sardi and had a son, Idris.

When The Teng Chun signed Mas Sardi to handle music for his company, Java Industrial Film, Hadidjah joined him. While Mas Sardi was music director, Hadidjah became an actress. Her debut was in Roesia si Pengkor (Secret of the Clubfoot; 1939), in which she portrayed a young woman who was protected against an unwanted suitor by her lover and her father.

After Roekiah and Rd Mochtar of Tan's Film became the colony's first on-screen couple, appearing in box-office hits such as Fatima (1938), Java Industrial Film decided to pair Hadidjah with Moh Mochtar, a football player skilled at silat, and cast them in romantic roles. In their first film together, Alang-Alang (Grass; 1939), Hadidjah portrayed a villager named Surati who is kidnapped by a spurned suitor and shipwrecked on a jungle island. This film was a massive commercial hit in the Indies and nearby British Malaya, and the Indonesian film historian Misbach Yusa Biran credits it as one of the causes of the revival the domestic film industry underwent in 1940.

The success of this film led Hadidjah and Moh Mochtar to be cast in romantic roles together for another five films for Java Industrial Film. In 1940, Hadidjah appeared in Matjan Berbisik (Whispering Tiger) as a young woman whom two brothers fight over, then in Rentjong Atjeh (Rencong of Aceh) as a young woman who survives in the jungle with her brother before falling in love with a soldier. In 1941 the pair appeared in another three films: Srigala Item (Black Wolf), Si Gomar, and Singa Laoet.

The Japanese occupied the Indies in March 1942, closing Java Industrial Film. Afterwards Hadidjah rarely acted. She returned to the silver screen for the first time in 1954, taking a small role in Kembali ke Masjarakat. She later took small roles in several further films, as if she was not keen to regain stardom. In 1976 she received an award from Governor of Jakarta Ali Sadikin in recognition of her contributions to the cinema of Indonesia. Hadidjah died in Jakarta on 10 October 2013 due to natural causes at the age of 93.

== Filmography ==
During her career Hadidjah appeared in some 15 films.

- Roesia si Pengkor (1939)
- Matjan Berbisik (1940)
- Rentjong Atjeh (1940)
- Alang-Alang (1939)
- Si Gomar (1941)
- Singa Laoet (1941)
- Srigala Item (1941)
- Kembali ke Masjarakat (1954)
- Momon (1959)
- Minah Gadis Dusun (1964)
- Cucu (1973)
- Manusia Terakhir (1973)
- Gaun Pengantin (1974)
- Sentuhan Cinta
- Ateng Pendekar Aneh (1977)

== Works cited ==
- Apa Siapa Orang Film Indonesia [What and Who: Film Figures in Indonesia] (in Indonesian). Jakarta: Indonesian Ministry of Information. 1999. OCLC 44427179.
- Biran, Misbach Yusa, ed. (1979). Apa Siapa Orang Film Indonesia 1926–1978 [What and Who: Film Figures in Indonesia, 1926–1978]. Sinematek Indonesia. OCLC 6655859.
- Biran, Misbach Yusa (2009). Sejarah Film 1900-1950: Bikin Film di Jawa [History of Film 1900-1950: Making Films in Java] (in Indonesian). Komunitas Bamboo working with the Jakarta Art Council. ISBN 978-979-3731-58-2.
- "Filmografi Hadidjah" [Filmography for Hadidjah]. filmindonesia.or.id (in Indonesian). Jakarta: Konfiden Foundation. Archived from the original on 2 January 2014.
- Imanjaya, Ekky (2006). A to Z about Indonesian Film (in Indonesian). Bandung: Mizan. ISBN 978-979-752-367-1.
- "Matjan Berbisik". filmindonesia.or.id (in Indonesian). Jakarta: Konfiden Foundation. Archived from the original on 2 December 2013.
- "Rentjong Atjeh". filmindonesia.or.id. Jakarta: Konfiden Foundation. Archived from the original on 16 October 2013.
- "Roesia si Pengkor". filmindonesia.or.id. Jakarta: Konfiden Foundation. Archived from the original on 16 October 2013.
