= Srigala Item =

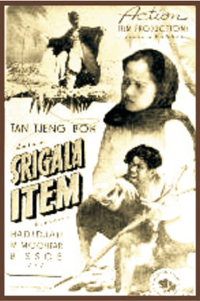
- Poster
- Directed by: Tan Tjoei Hock
- Screenplay by: Tan Tjoei Hock
- Produced by: The Teng Chun
- Starring: Hadidjah; Moh Mochtar; Tan Tjeng Bok
- Cinematography: The Teng Gan
- Edited by: The TS
- Music by: Mas Sardi
- Production company: Java Industrial Film
- Release date: 1941 (Dutch East Indies)
- Country: Dutch East Indies
- Language: Indonesian

Srigala Item (Indonesian for Black Wolf, also advertised with the Dutch title De Zwarte Wolf) is a 1941 film from the Dutch East Indies that was directed by Tan Tjoei Hock and produced by The Teng Chun for Action Film. Starring Hadidjah, Mohamad Mochtar, and Tan Tjeng Bok, the film's plot – inspired by Zorro – follows a young man who became a masked vigilante to take revenge against his conniving uncle. Srigala Item was a commercial success, which Misbach Yusa Biran credits to the plot's use for escapism. A copy of the black-and-white film, which featured kroncong music, is stored at Sinematek Indonesia.

== Plot ==
Through violence, Djoekri (Tan Tjeng Bok) is able to gain control of his brother Mardjoeki's (Bissu Usman) wealth and plantation, Soemberwaras. The latter disappears, leaving behind his adult son Mochtar (Mohamad Mochtar). At the plantation, the young man is treated as a servant and often beaten by Djoekri and his right-hand man, Hasan. Djoekri's son Joesoef (Mohamad Sani), however, leads a life of plenty.

Soon Djoekri's activities are targeted by a masked man known as the "Black Wolf" ("Srigala Item"), who also foils Joesoef's attempts to woo Soehaemi (Hadidjah), whom Mochtar loves. Djoekri tires of the Black Wolf's interference and takes him on in a battle. Though Djoekri almost wins, ultimately the Black Wolf emerges victorious. It is later revealed that Mardjoeki remains alive and Mochtar was the Black Wolf.

== Production ==
The film was written and directed by Tan Tjoei Hock for Action Film, a subsidiary of producer The Teng Chun's Java Industrial Film (JIF). Tan, who had made his directorial debut in 1940, based Srigala Item on the stories surrounding Johnston McCulley's fictional bandit Zorro; (Note: Sources disagree on which version served as the inspiration. Kristanto (Filmindonesia.or.id, Srigala Item) credits The Mark of Zorro (1940). Said, McGlynn & Boileau (1991, p. 28) credit a stage version of the bandit.) as with the American bandit, the Black Wolf used a whip and wore all black. The black-and-white film was shot by The Teng Chun's brother Teng Gan, with Hajopan Bajo Angin as artistic designer.

The film starred Hadidjah and Mohamad Mochtar, who had first acted together in JIF's Alang-Alang (Grass; 1939) and were promoted as a celebrity couple in competition with Raden Mochtar and Roekiah of Tan's Film. It also featured Bissoe, Tan Tjeng Bok, and Mohamad Sani. Bissoe had made his feature film debut with JIF's Oh Iboe in 1938, while Sani had made his debut for JIF in 1940. Tan Tjeng Bok, a former stage star with Dardanella, made his feature film debut through Srigala Item.

Music for Srigala Item was done in the kroncong (traditional music with Portuguese influences) style, popular at the time, by Mas Sardi. Hadidjah is credited as singing two songs, "Ja. Ja. Ja. Ja." ("Yeah. Yeah. Yeah. Yeah.") and "Termenoeng-Menoeng" ("Pensive"); Tan Tjeng Bok is also recorded as performing a song.

== Release and reception ==
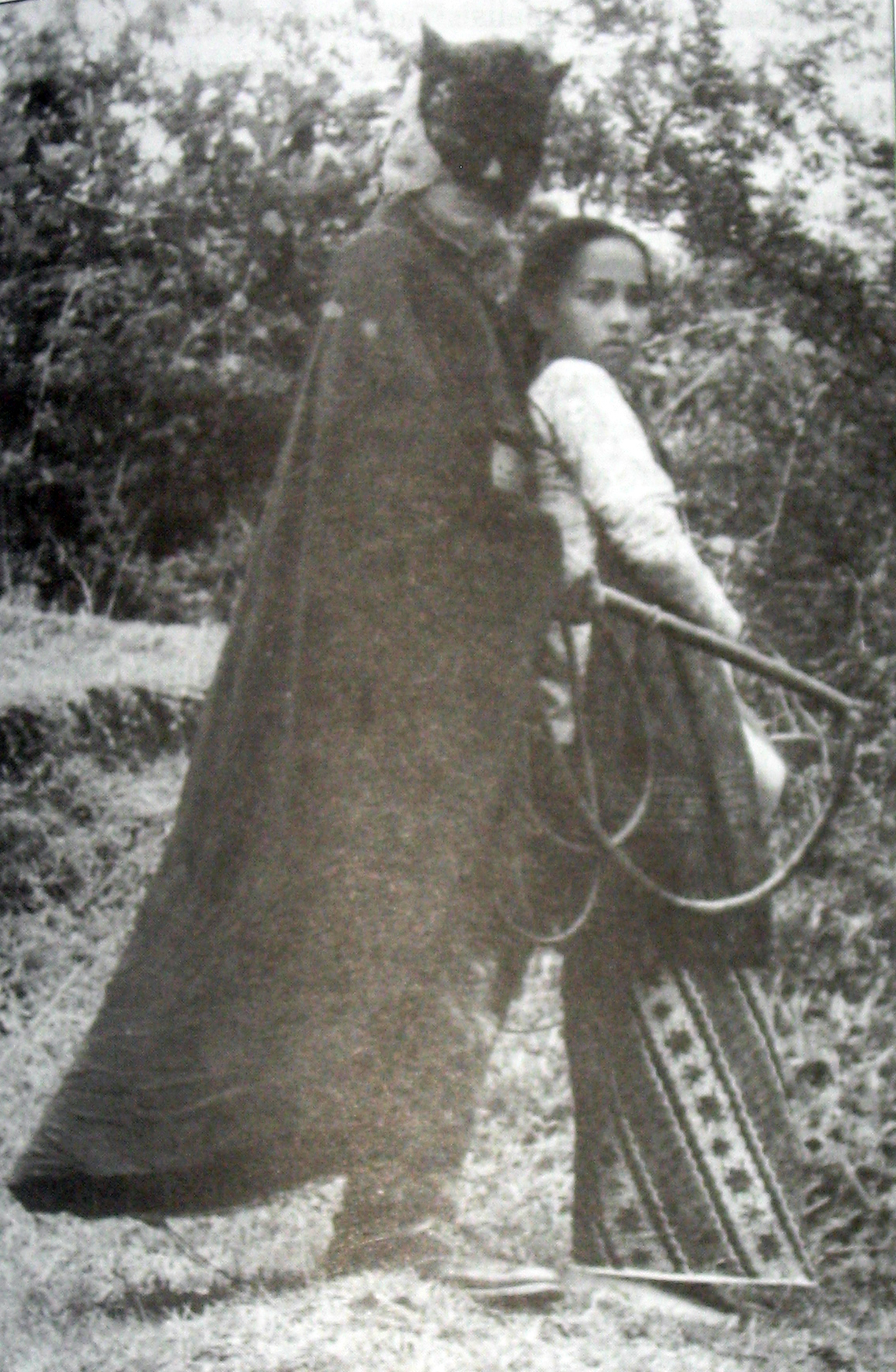
Mohamad Mochtar and Hadidjah in a promotional still

Srigala Item premiered in the first half of 1941, one of nine films released by JIF and its subsidiaries that year. It was advertised, sometimes under the Dutch name of De Zwarte Wolf, as "sensational, full of action, and mysterious" (Note: Original: "... sensationeele, actievolle en mysterieuze") and marketed for all ages. The film was released in Batavia (modern day Jakarta), the capital of the Indies, and by July 1941 it had reached Surabaya, in Eastern Java, and Singapore, then part of British Malaya.

An anonymous review of Srigala Item in the Surabaya-based daily Soerabaijasch Handelsblad was positive, predicting the film would be a commercial success. This prediction was fulfilled, as Srigala Item reached extensive audiences – mostly lower-class natives. The Indonesian film historian Misbach Yusa Biran credits this success to escapism. He writes that the film's theme of an oppressed, financially destitute youth who is able to control his destiny by becoming a masked vigilante, allowed viewers to be able to see themselves as the Black Wolf, and thus take revenge against those who had wronged them.

Action Film and JIF continued producing films until the beginning of the Japanese occupation of the Indies began in early 1942, leading to the closing of all but one film studio. The cast of Srigala Item remained with JIF until the company closed, as did Tan. According to JB Kristanto's Katalog Film Indonesia (Catalogue of Indonesian Films), a copy of Srigala Item is stored at Sinematek Indonesia in Jakarta. The reels have been damaged by acid, leading to part of the film being excised.

== Works cited ==
- Biran, Misbach Yusa (2009). Sejarah Film 1900–1950: Bikin Film di Jawa [History of Film 1900–1950: Making Films in Java] (in Indonesian). Jakarta: Komunitas Bamboo working with the Jakarta Art Council. ISBN 978-979-3731-58-2.
- Biran, Misbach Yusa (1986). Snapshots of Indonesian Film History and Non-theatrical Films in Indonesia. Jakarta: Komunitas Bamboo working with the Jakarta Art Council. OCLC 20550138.
- Imanjaya, Ekky (2006). A to Z about Indonesian Film (in Indonesian). Bandung: Mizan. ISBN 978-979-752-367-1.
- "Kredit Srigala Item" [Credits for Srigala Item]. filmindonesia.or.id (in Indonesian). Jakarta: Konfiden Foundation. Archived from the original on 4 March 2016.
- "M. Sani". filmindonesia.or.id (in Indonesian). Jakarta: Konfiden Foundation. Archived from the original on 7 March 2016.
- Said, Salim; McGlynn, John H.; Boileau, Janet P. (1991). Shadows on the Silver Screen: A Social History of Indonesian Film. Jakarta: Lontar Foundation. ISBN 978-979-8083-04-4.
- "Sampoerna-theater "Srigala Item"". Soerabaijasch Handelsblad (in Dutch). Surabaya: Kolff & Co. 23 July 1941. p. 8.
- Sembiring, Dalih (26 August 2009). "Saving Indonesian Cinema Treasures". Jakarta Globe. Archived from the original on 30 July 2012.
- "Srigala Item". filmindonesia.or.id (in Indonesian). Jakarta: Konfiden Foundation. Archived from the original on 2 December 2013.
- "Tan Tjoei Hock | Filmografi" [Tan Tjoei Hock | Filmography]. filmindonesia.or.id (in Indonesian). Jakarta: Konfidan Foundation. Archived from the original on 29 October 2013.
- "(untitled)". Soerabaijasch Handelsblad (in Dutch). Surabaya: Kolff & Co. 23 July 1941. p. 10.
- "(untitled)". The Straits Times. Singapore. 11 July 1941. p. 6.
