= Roesia si Pengkor =

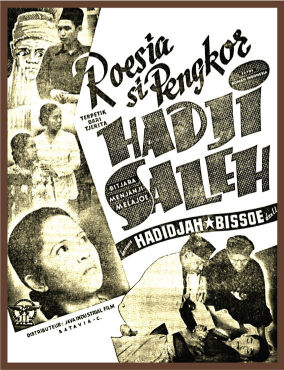
- Poster
- Directed by: The Teng Chun
- Produced by: The Teng Chun
- Starring: Da'ing; Bissu; Hadidjah
- Cinematography: The Teng Liong
- Production company: Java Industrial Film
- Release date: 1939 (Dutch East Indies)
- Country: Dutch East Indies
- Language: Malay

Roesia si Pengkor ([ruˈsia siˈ peŋˈkor]; Perfected Spelling: Rusia si Pengkor, Indonesian for Secret of the Clubfoot), also known as Hadji Saleh, is a 1939 film from the Dutch East Indies (now Indonesia) which was directed and produced by The Teng Chun for his Java Industrial Film. Starring Da'ing, Bissu, and Hadidjah, this black-and-white film followed a young woman who is saved from deceptive suitors by her beloved and a man known as "Si Pengkor".

== Plot ==
Hadji Saleh goes on a pilgrimage to a sacred mountain, leaving behind his wife and daughter Suti. Owing to her beauty, Suti receives many suitors. She, however, only loves Saari. Because of this love, Saari's friend Lihin (a spurned suitor) manipulates the police into imprisoning Saari. Upon his release, after being found not guilty, Saari must fight a would-be suitor named Usin before ultimately being recognised as Suti's husband-to-be. After the climax, it is revealed that Suti was often protected without her knowledge by her father, using the nickname "Si Pengkor".

== Production ==
Roesia si Pengkor was directed and produced by The Teng Chun for his company Java Industrial Film. Cinematography was handled by his brother The Teng Liong, while sound for this black-and-white film was provided by another The brother, The Teng Hui. The film starred Da'ing, Bissu, and Hadidjah. Bissu had long worked for JIF, whereas Hadidjah – the wife of musician Mas Sardi – was a new hire. The story of a masked figure aiding a girl was likely inspired by the earlier production Gagak Item, released by Java Industrial Film's rival Tan's Film.

The completed Roesia si Pengkor two years after the commercial success of Dutch–Indonesian journalist Albert Balink's Terang Boelan and a year after Tan's Film's Fatima. Though his earlier works had been oriented at ethnic Chinese audiences, Roesia si Pengkor was targeted at the native population of the Indies. The success of the earlier films convinced him that it presented greater financial opportunities. This emphasis towards native audiences was also shown in advertisements, which repeatedly used the word "Indonesia", a word used by nationalists.

== Release ==
Roesia si Pengkor was released in 1939. Ultimately, Indonesian film historian Misbach Yusa Biran writes, it was unable to truly capture the elements which had made Terang Boelan and Fatima successful. However, The's later production Alang-Alang, which followed the Terang Boelan formula more closely, proved to be one of his greatest successes.

The film is likely lost. The American visual anthropologist Karl G. Heider writes that all Indonesian films from before 1950 are lost. However, JB Kristanto's Katalog Film Indonesia (Indonesian Film Catalogue) records several as having survived at Sinematek Indonesia's archives, and Biran writes that several Japanese propaganda films have survived at the Netherlands Government Information Service.

== Works cited ==
- Biran, Misbach Yusa (2009). Sejarah Film 1900–1950: Bikin Film di Jawa [History of Film 1900–1950: Making Films in Java] (in Indonesian). Jakarta: Komunitas Bamboo working with the Jakarta Art Council. ISBN 978-979-3731-58-2.
- Heider, Karl G (1991). Indonesian Cinema: National Culture on Screen. Honolulu: University of Hawaii Press. ISBN 978-0-8248-1367-3.
- "Roesia si Pengkor". filmindonesia.or.id. Jakarta: Konfiden Foundation. Archived from the original on 16 October 2013.
