= Si Gomar =

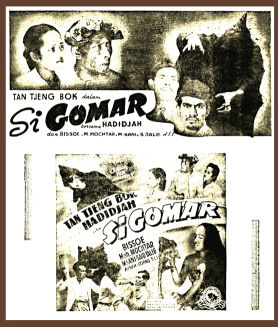
- Advertisement
- Directed by: Tan Tjoei Hock
- Produced by: The Teng Chun
- Starring: Hadidjah; Tan Tjeng Bok; Mohamad Mochtar
- Music by: Mas Sardi
- Production company: Java Industrial Film
- Release date: September 1941 (Dutch East Indies)
- Country: Dutch East Indies
- Language: Indonesian

Si Gomar is a 1941 film from the Dutch East Indies which was written and directed by Tan Tjoei Hock and produced by The Teng Chun. Starring Hadidjah, Mohamad Mochtar, and Tan Tjeng Bok, the movie follows a brother and sister who are separated by robbers and almost marry before their cousin recognises them.

== Plot ==
After a run-in with robbers, Badjoeri and his son Soebardja are set adrift on a river. Badjoeri's wife and daughter, Ramina and Mariani, are captured by the bandits. Though they escape with the help of Wirama, Ramina dies soon afterwards. Badjoeri also dies, soon after leaving Soebardja with Mansur.

Years pass, and Soebardja and Mariani are set to marry. As they have been raised separately, by different people, they do not realize that they are brother and sister. The marriage is only called off after their cousin Ismail realizes the true relationship of the would-be bride and groom.

== Production ==
Si Gomar was written and directed by Tan Tjoei Hock for Action Film, a subsidiary of Java Industrial Film (JIF). The film was produced by The Teng Chun, owner of the company, who had signed Tan in 1940 after seeing him at Prinsen Park (now Lokasari). Artistic arrangement was handled by Hajopan Bajo Angin. Music was provided by Mas Sardi, whereas sound was handled by The Teng Chun's brother TS The.

Hadidjah, Mohamad Mochtar, and Tan Tjeng Bok starred in Si Gomar; the film also featured Bissu, Aysah, M. Sani, and Said Thalib. Hadidjah and Tan Tjeng Bok both took a dual role; Hadidjah played Ramina and Mariani, whereas Tan Tjeng Bok played Badjoeri and Soebardja. Filming of this black-and-white production had been completed by August 1941.

== Release and reception ==
Si Gomar was released by September 1941. An anonymous review for Pertjatoeran Doenia dan Film praised the movie, particularly Tan Tjeng Bok's acting in his double role and the visual effects – such as those showing an erupting volcano and a forest fire.

Soon after the completion of Si Gomar, Action Film began production on another work, Singa Laoet. This later production featured the same cast and crew. Action Film, together with JIF, continued as the most productive studio in the Dutch East Indies until the Japanese occupation began in March 1942, causing all but one film studio to be shut down.

Si Gomar was shown as late as December 1943. It is now likely lost, as are all Indonesian films from before 1950 according to American visual anthropologist Karl G. Heider. As elsewhere in the world at the time, movies produced in the Indies were shot on highly inflammable nitrate film, and after a fire destroyed much of Produksi Film Negara's warehouse in 1952, old films shot on nitrate stock were deliberately destroyed. However, Kristanto records several as having survived at Sinematek Indonesia's archives, and film historian Misbach Yusa Biran writes that several Japanese propaganda films have survived at the Netherlands Government Information Service.

== Works cited ==
- "Action Production: Si Gomar". Pertjatoeran Doenia Dan Film (in Indonesian). Batavia: 47. September 1941.
- "Berita Djawa no. 19 sebagai Pendahoeloean Film Si Gomar di Kranggan" [Berita Djawa No. 19 as a Prelude to Si Gomar at Kranggan]. Soeara Asia (in Indonesian). Yogyakarta. 27 December 1943. p. 2.
- Biran, Misbach Yusa (2009). Sejarah Film 1900–1950: Bikin Film di Jawa [History of Film 1900–1950: Making Films in Java] (in Indonesian). Komunitas Bamboo working with the Jakarta Art Council. ISBN 978-979-3731-58-2.
- Biran, Misbach Yusa (2012). "Film di Masa Kolonial" [Film in the Colonial Period]. Indonesia dalam Arus Sejarah: Masa Pergerakan Kebangsaan [Indonesia in the Flow of Time: The Nationalist Movement] (in Indonesian). Vol. V. Ministry of Education and Culture. pp. 268–93. ISBN 978-979-9226-97-6.
- Heider, Karl G. (1991). Indonesian Cinema: National Culture on Screen. Honolulu: University of Hawaii Press. ISBN 978-0-8248-1367-3.
- "Kredit Si Gomar" [Credits for Si Gomar]. filmindonesia.or.id (in Indonesian). Jakarta: Konfiden Foundation. Archived from the original on 11 January 2014.
- "Si Gomar". filmindonesia.or.id (in Indonesian). Jakarta: Konfiden Foundation. Archived from the original on 2 December 2013. (also available in English)
- "Singa Laoet". filmindonesia.or.id (in Indonesian). Jakarta: Konfiden Foundation. Archived from the original on 2 December 2013.
- "Tan Tjoei Hock". Encyclopedia of Jakarta (in Indonesian). Jakarta: Jakarta City Government. Archived from the original on 29 October 2013.
- "Warta Studio" [News from the Studios]. Pertjatoeran Doenia Dan Film (in Indonesian). Batavia: 28. August 1941.
