= Sardis (disambiguation) =

Sardis was the capital of the ancient kingdom of Lydia, in present-day Turkey.

Sardis may also refer to:

== Places ==
=== Canada ===
- Sardis, Chilliwack, a neighbourhood within the City of Chilliwack

=== United States ===
- Sardis, Alabama, an unincorporated community
- Sardis City, Alabama
- Sardis, Arkansas, an unincorporated community
- Sardis, Georgia, a town
- Sardis, Kentucky, a city
- Sardis, Mississippi, a town
- Sardis, Ohio, a census-designated place
- Sardis, Oklahoma, a community
- Sardis, Pennsylvania, populated place within the Municipality of Murrysville, PA
- Sardis, Tennessee, a town
- Sardis, Texas, an unincorporated community
- Sardis, West Virginia, an unincorporated community
- Sardis Lake (Mississippi)
- Sardis Lake (Oklahoma)

=== Wales ===
- Sardis, Carmarthenshire, a location
- Sardis, southeast Pembrokeshire, a village in southeast Pembrokeshire
- Sardis, south Pembrokeshire, a village in south Pembrokeshire

== In religion ==
- See of Sardis, an episcopal see
- Sardis Synagogue, Turkey
- Sardis Baptist Church (disambiguation), several churches in the US
- Sardis Methodist Church, Sparkman, Arkansas
- Sardis Presbyterian Church and Cemetery, Coosa, Georgia

== See also ==
- Sardi (disambiguation)
- Sardi's restaurant
