= Matula (1941 film) =

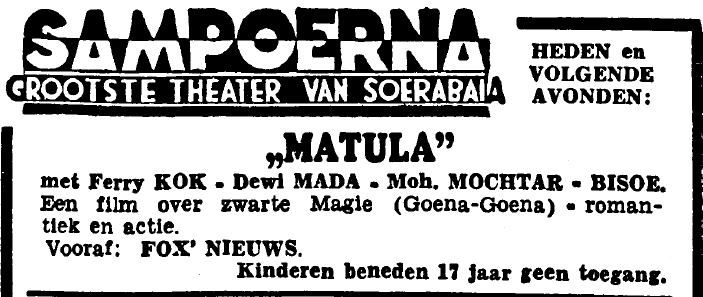
- Newspaper ad, Surabaya
- Directed by: Tan Tjoei Hock
- Screenplay by: Ferry Kock
- Produced by: The Teng Chun
- Starring: Ferry Kock; Dewi Mada; Mohamad Mochtar; Bissu
- Cinematography: Tan Tjoei Hock
- Music by: Mas Sardi
- Production company: Action Film
- Release date: 1941 (Dutch East Indies)
- Country: Dutch East Indies
- Language: Indonesian

Matula ([maˈtula]) is a 1941 film from the Dutch East Indies (present-day Indonesia) which was directed by Tan Tjoei Hock and produced by The Teng Chun of Java Industrial Film. The black-and-white film, now likely lost, follows a young man who tries to give a woman's soul to a shaman as payment for being made handsome.

== Plot ==
A rich yet hideously deformed youth named Matula (Ferry Kock) visits a dukun (shaman) named Tello, asking to be made handsome. Tello agrees, then does the deed. When Matula asks him to name his price, Tello asks to be paid with a soul. Using his magic, Tello arranges for Emma (Dewi Mada), the daughter of a rich businessman, to meet Matula in a plantation, where Matula can convince her to come with him. Upon realising what is happening, Emma's father Johan and her fiancé Paul chase down Matula. They are too late, as Tello has taken Emma's soul. The four men fight, and though Paul's soul is almost taken, Johan is able to defeat Tello with a bamboo shaft. Defeated, Tello returns Emma's soul. Matula returns to his original form, reeking of death; Tello then demands his soul.

== Production ==
Matula was produced by The Teng Chun for Action Film, a subsidiary of his company New Java Industrial Film. It was directed by Tan Tjoei Hock, a former theatre assistant, who had worked who had made his directorial debut the preceding year with Dasima; Tan also handled cinematography. Music was handled by Mas Sardi.

It was written by Ferry Kock (who also starred), a former stage actor with the touring troupe Dardanella who had made his film debut in 1940 with Rentjong Atjeh. The black-and-white film also starred Dewi Mada, Mohamad Mochtar, and Bissu.

== Release and reception ==
Matula was released in 1941, reaching Surabaya by late January. Open to audiences aged 17 and older, it was advertised as "a film of black magic (guna-guna), action, and romance". (Note: Original: "... een film over zwarte Magie (goena-goena) - romantiek en actie.") A review in the Surabaya-based Soerabaijasch Handelsblad stated that the film was "in every way successful", (Note: Original: "... in alle opzichten goed geslaagd.") particularly praising Kock's performance.

The film is likely lost. The American visual anthropologist Karl G. Heider writes that all Indonesian films from before 1950 are lost. However, JB Kristanto's Katalog Film Indonesia (Indonesian Film Catalogue) records several as having survived at Sinematek Indonesia's archives, and Biran writes that several Japanese propaganda films have survived at the Netherlands Government Information Service.

== Works cited ==
- Biran, Misbach Yusa, ed. (1979). Apa Siapa Orang Film Indonesia 1926–1978 [What and Who: Film Figures in Indonesia, 1926–1978]. Sinematek Indonesia. OCLC 6655859.
- Biran, Misbach Yusa (2009). Sejarah Film 1900–1950: Bikin Film di Jawa [History of Film 1900–1950: Making Films in Java] (in Indonesian). Jakarta: Komunitas Bamboo working with the Jakarta Art Council. ISBN 978-979-3731-58-2.
- Heider, Karl G (1991). Indonesian Cinema: National Culture on Screen. Honolulu: University of Hawaii Press. ISBN 978-0-8248-1367-3.
- "Matula". filmindonesia.or.id (in Indonesian). Jakarta: Konfiden Foundation. Archived from the original on 2 December 2013.
- "Sampoerna: Matula". Soerabaijasch Handelsblad (in Dutch). Surabaya: Kolff & Co. 27 January 1941. p. 6.
- "Tan Tjoei Hock". Encyclopedia of Jakarta (in Indonesian). Jakarta: Jakarta City Government. Archived from the original on 29 October 2013.
- "(untitled)". Soerabaijasch Handelsblad (in Dutch). Surabaya: Kolff & Co. 29 January 1941. p. 12.
