= Tan Tjoei Hock =

Indonesian journalist and filmmaker

- Born: April 15, 1908; Batavia, Dutch East Indies
- Died: 1984 (aged 75–76)
- Other name: Tanu Trh.
- Occupations: Journalist; filmmaker
- Known for: Film directing

Tan Tjoei Hock (15 April 1908 – 1984) was an Indonesian journalist and filmmaker. Born in Batavia, he was discovered by The Teng Chun in the late 1930s. Tan became one of the most productive film directors of the Dutch East Indies between 1940 and 1941, directing nine films – primarily action.

== Biography ==
Tan was born in Batavia (now Jakarta), Dutch East Indies, on 15 April 1908. He dropped out during his first year of senior high school. By the late 1930s he had become a businessman, spending his nights as an unpaid assistant at a drama troupe that frequently performed at Prinsen Park (now Lokasari); while working with this troupe Tan met The Teng Chun, who brought him to work at The's Java Industrial Film (JIF).

Tan's first film with JIF was Dasima, a story about a woman who is taken advantage of by a man who marries her yet does not love her, which diverged from its source material, the 1896 novel Tjerita Njai Dasima by G. Francis. This was followed soon after by Matjan Berbisik (Whispering Tiger), a drama that followed two boys, raised as brothers, in violent competition for the love of a girl; Sorga Palsoe, a drama following the internal strife in a Chinese family; and Melati van Agam (Jasmine of Agam), the second adaptation of Parada Harahap's drama of the same name.

In 1941, Tan directed several additional films, starting with Si Gomar in 1941. This film, following two long-separated siblings who nearly marry each other, was the feature film debut of Tan Tjeng Bok, a former theatre star with Dardanella. Tan followed this with several films in 1941. These included Srigala Item (Black Wolf), an adaptation of The Mark of Zorro; Matula, a film of love and magic; Singa Laoet (Sea Lion), following a band of pirates; and Tengkorak Hidoep (Living Skull), which has been credited as the first horror film produced in what is now Indonesia. (Note: JB Kristanto, in his catalogue of Indonesian films, credits Lisa (1971) as the first true horror film made in Indonesia; Tengkorak Hidoep is classified as an adventure film in his catalogue.) Although he was only active for two years, Tan was one of the most active film directors of the Dutch East Indies during this period.

After the Japanese occupation, which led to nearly all studios in the country being closed, Tan focused on journalism; however, he later told the Indonesian film historian Misbach Yusa Biran that he had completed Njoo Cheong Seng's Air Mata Iboe during the occupation. Throughout this turbulent period that saw Indonesia achieve its independence, Tan wrote on sports and, later, retrospectives of life in the Indies. He also wrote several films for Young in 1949, although he was no longer active as a director. Throughout the 1950s he served as head editor of the magazine Djaja, writing under the pseudonym Tanu Trh. He remained active until his death in 1984.

== Filmography ==
Tan was involved in the production of twelve films in a period of ten years, nine as a director. Many of his films were under JIF's subsidiary Action Film and targeted at lower-class audiences. Most are recorded as moderate successes, although some, such as Sorga Palsoe, did not perform well.

- Dasima (1940) – As director
- Matjan Berbisik (Whispering Tiger; 1940) – As director and screenwriter
- Sorga Palsoe (False Paradise; 1940) – As director
- Melati Van Agam (Jasmine of Agam; 1940) – As director
- Si Gomar (1941) – As director and storywriter
- Srigala Item (Black Wolf; 1941) – As director and storywriter
- Matula (1941) – As director and cinematographer
- Singa Laoet (Sea Lion; 1941) – As director, screenwriter, story writer, cinematographer, and sound manager
- Tengkorak Hidoep (Living Skull; 1941) – As director, screenwriter, storywriter, cinematographer, and sound manager
- Sehidup Semati (One Life, One Death; 1949) – As screenwriter
- Saputangan (Handkerchief; 1949) – As screenwriter
- Bengawan Solo (Solo River; 1949) – As screenwriter
