= Matjan Berbisik =

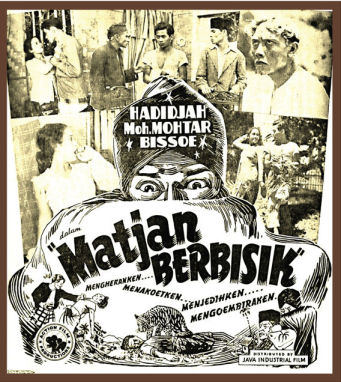
- Poster
- Directed by: Tan Tjoei Hock
- Produced by: The Teng Chun
- Starring: Hadidjah; Moh Mochtar
- Music by: Mas Sardi
- Production company: Action Film
- Release date: 1940 (Dutch East Indies)
- Country: Dutch East Indies
- Language: Indonesian

Matjan Berbisik (Indonesian for Whispering Tiger; Perfected Spelling: Macan Berbisik, also known by the Dutch title De Fluisterende Tijger) is a 1940 film from the Dutch East Indies which was directed by Tan Tjoei Hock and produced by The Teng Chun. Starring Hadidjah and Mohamad Mochtar, the film follows two men who are raised as brothers and compete for the love of the same woman. A copy of the black-and-white film, which featured keroncong music, is stored at Sinematek Indonesia.

== Plot ==
Djaja (Bissoe) has disappeared, leaving his son Hamid with Sanip (Said) in a rural village. The boy is raised together with Sanip's son Usman, two years older. When the two are adults, Usman falls for Zainab (Hadidjah). She, however, prefers Hamid (Mohamad Mochtar). Jealous, Usman convinces his friends to rough up Hamid, who ultimately falls off a cliff. Thinking Hamid dead, Usman continues to woo Zainab. However, when it appears she will accept him, Hamid returns. The film climaxes with two large battles.

== Cast ==
- Hadidjah as Zainab
- M. Mochtar as Hamid
- Bisoe as Djaja
- Sani as Oesman
- Adja as Milan
- Hamid as Achmad
- Moesa Pancho as Chief
- Said as Sanip
- M. Tohhar as Djamal
- Habibah as Saleha
- M. Njai as M. Njai
- Zoebaida as Coffee maker
- Zainab

== Production ==
Matjan Berbisik was directed by Tan Tjoei Hock and produced by The Teng Chun for Action Film, a subsidiary of Java Industrial Film (JIF). Tan had previously worked for The on Dasima in 1940. Tan wrote the black-and-white film's script, while Mas Sardi handled music. The title was derived from an Indonesian belief that a person could house the soul of a tiger: vicious, hungry, and dangerous.

The film starred Mohamad Mochtar and Hadidjah, who had first acted together in The's Alang-Alang (Grass; 1939) and were promoted as a celebrity couple in competition with Raden Mochtar and Roekiah of Tan's Film. Other cast members included Bissoe and Said. Bissoe had been acting for JIF since Oh Iboe (Oh Mother) some two years previously. The keroncong singer Miss Soelami made an appearance, providing vocals; keroncong, traditional music with Portuguese influences, had become common in films following the success of Albert Balink's Terang Boelan (Full Moon) in 1937.

== Release and reception ==
Matjan Berbisik premiered in 1940, one of six films released by JIF and Action Film that year. Also shown with the Dutch title De Fluisterende Tijger, the film was promoted as being for all ages. An anonymous review in the Surabaya-based Soerabaijasch Handelsblad was positive, praising the visuals and a comic performance. The reviewer did, however, take issue with the production's sound quality and tendency of its actors to attempt and employ Westernised fighting techniques.

Action Film and JIF continued producing films until the beginning of the Japanese occupation of the Indies began in February 1942, leading to the closing of all but one film studio. The cast of Matjan Berbisik remained with JIF, as did Tan, who directed another seven films. According to JB Kristanto's Katalog Film Indonesia (Catalogue of Indonesian Films), a copy of Matjan Berbisik is stored at Sinematek Indonesia in Jakarta.

== Works cited ==
- Biran, Misbach Yusa (2009). Sejarah Film 1900–1950: Bikin Film di Jawa [History of Film 1900–1950: Making Films in Java] (in Indonesian). Jakarta: Komunitas Bamboo working with the Jakarta Art Council. ISBN 978-979-3731-58-2.
- Imanjaya, Ekky (2006). A to Z about Indonesian Film (in Indonesian). Bandung: Mizan. ISBN 978-979-752-367-1.
- "Kredit Matjan Berbisik" [Credits for Matjan Berbisik]. filmindonesia.or.id (in Indonesian). Jakarta: Konfiden Foundation. Archived from the original on 21 October 2016.
- "Matjan Berbisik". filmindonesia.or.id (in Indonesian). Jakarta: Konfiden Foundation. Archived from the original on 2 December 2013.
- "Princess: Matjan Berbisik". Soerabaijasch Handelsblad (in Dutch). Surabaya: Kolff & Co. 24 July 1940. p. 10.
- "Tan Tjoei Hock | Filmografi" [Tan Tjoei Hock | Filmography]. filmindonesia.or.id (in Indonesian). Jakarta: Konfidan Foundation. Archived from the original on 29 October 2013.
- "(untitled)". Soerabaijasch Handelsblad (in Dutch). Surabaya: Kolff & Co. 22 July 1940. p. 8.
