= Sardi, Iran =

Sardi (Persian: ساردي or سردي) in Iran may refer to:

- Sardi, Ardabil (سردي - Sardī)
- Sardi, Rudbar-e Jonubi (سردي - Sardī), Kerman Province

== See also ==
- Deh-e Sardi
