= Gadis jang Terdjoeal =

- Directed by: The Teng Chun
- Produced by: The Teng Chun
- Production company: Java Industrial Film
- Release date: c.: 1937 (Dutch East Indies)
- Country: Dutch East Indies
- Language: Indonesian

Gadis jang Terdjoeal is a c. 1937 film from the Dutch East Indies (now Indonesia). It was directed by The Teng Chun, his first film to recognise native interests.

== Plot ==
Han Nio is in love with Oey Koen Beng. However, Han Nio's mother – hoping for a rich son-in-law to feed her gambling habit – arranges for Han Nio to marry a rich young man named Lim Goan Tek.

Though they have a daughter, their life together is unhappy, and ultimately Goan Tek accuses of Han Nio of stealing from him and runs her out of the house. She falls ill and dies soon afterwards, but not before meeting Koen Beng. Learning of how his former lover had been treated, Koen Beng seeks out Goan Tek. However, before he can have his revenge, Han Nio's brother Eng Swan – the real thief – shoots Goan Tek, killing him.

== Production ==
Gadis jang Terdjoeal was produced and directed by The Teng Chun for his company, Java Industrial Film. He had made his directorial debut in 1931 with the film Boenga Roos dari Tjikembang, and his subsequent productions had been based on Chinese legends and targeted at ethnic Chinese audiences. Following Albert Balink's Pareh (Rice) in 1936, The realized the potential of native audiences and began directing works with more modern stories which suited their interests, although characters remained Chinese.

The cast and crew of this black-and-white film is otherwise not recorded.

== Release and reception ==
Gadis jang Terdjoeal was released around 1937. Movies were shot on flammable nitrate film, and after a fire destroyed much of Produksi Film Negara's warehouse in 1952, old films shot on nitrate were deliberately destroyed. The film is likely lost.

American visual anthropologist Karl G. Heider suggests that all Indonesian films from before 1950 are lost. However, JB Kristanto's Katalog Film Indonesia (Indonesian Film Catalogue) records several as having survived at Sinematek Indonesia's archives, and film historian Misbach Yusa Biran writes that several Japanese propaganda films have survived at the Netherlands Government Information Service.

== Works cited ==
- Biran, Misbach Yusa (2009). Sejarah Film 1900–1950: Bikin Film di Jawa [History of Film 1900–1950: Making Films in Java] (in Indonesian). Jakarta: Komunitas Bamboo working with the Jakarta Art Council. ISBN 978-979-3731-58-2.
- Biran, Misbach Yusa (2012). "Film di Masa Kolonial" [Film in the Colonial Period]. Indonesia dalam Arus Sejarah: Masa Pergerakan Kebangsaan [Indonesia in the Flow of Time: The Nationalist Movement] (in Indonesian). Vol. V. Ministry of Education and Culture. pp. 268–93. ISBN 978-979-9226-97-6.
- "Gadis jang Terdjoeal". filmindonesia.or.id (in Indonesian). Jakarta: Konfiden Foundation. Archived from the original on 16 October 2013.
- Heider, Karl G (1991). Indonesian Cinema: National Culture on Screen. Honolulu: University of Hawaii Press. ISBN 978-0-8248-1367-3.
