= Sardo (disambiguation) =

Sardo is a hard, grating cow's milk cheese that is similar to Pecorino Romano.

Sardo may also refer to:

== Places ==
- Bari Sardo, municipality in the province of Nuoro in the Italian region Sardinia
- Meana Sardo, municipality in the province of Nuoro in the Italian region Sardinia
- Riola Sardo, municipality in the province of Oristano in the Italian region Sardinia

== Other uses ==
- Italian for Sardinian language (Sardinian Sardu, Italian Sardo) with its two main orthographies:
  - Logudorese dialect (Sardu logudoresu)
  - Campidanese dialect (Sardu campidanesu)
- Gennaro Sardo (born 1979), Italian footballer
- Levriero Sardo, a breed of dog
- Pecorino Sardo, firm cheese from the Italian island of Sardinia which is made from sheep milk
- Sardo, a character from the Canadian TV series Are You Afraid of the Dark?

== See also ==
- Sard (Carnelian), a brownish-red mineral
- Sarda (disambiguation)
- Sardi (disambiguation)
- Sardu (disambiguation)
