= Rentjong Atjeh =

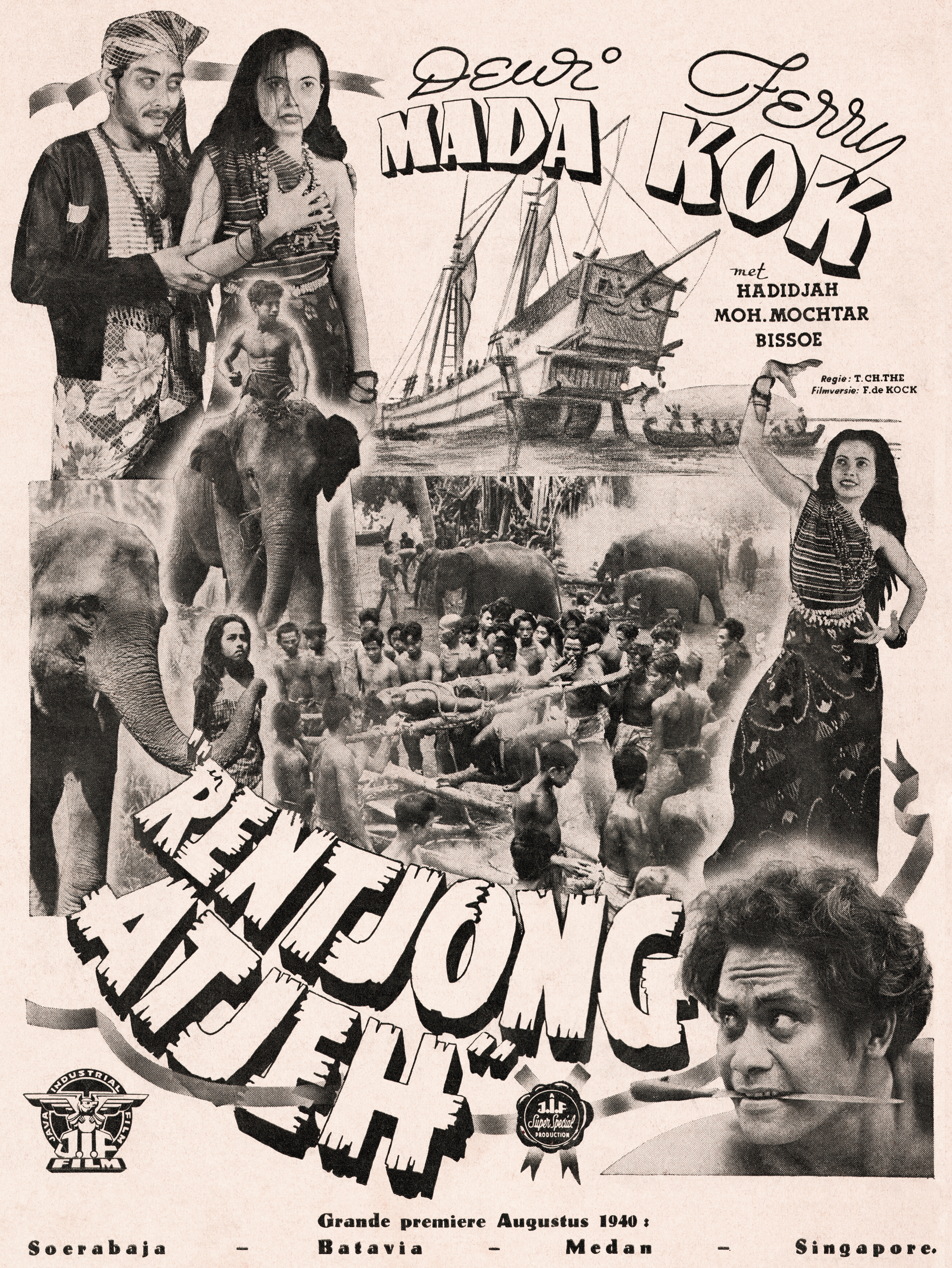
- Poster
- Directed by: The Teng Chun
- Written by: Ferry Kock
- Produced by: The Teng Chun
- Starring: Ferry Kock; Dewi Mada; Bissoe; Mohammad Mochtar; Hadidjah
- Cinematography: The Teng Hwi
- Music by: Mas Sardi
- Production company: Java Industrial Film
- Release date: 1940 (Dutch East Indies)
- Country: Dutch East Indies
- Language: Malay

Rentjong Atjeh (Perfected Spelling: Rencong Aceh; meaning Rencong of Aceh) is a 1940 action film from the Dutch East Indies directed by The Teng Chun. Telling of a group who take revenge against pirates in the Strait of Malacca, it starred Ferry Kock, Dewi Mada, Bissoe, Mohammad Mochtar, and Hadidjah. It was filmed near the shore in Batavia (modern day Jakarta) and reused footage from The's earlier work Alang-Alang (1939). Rentjong Atjeh, inspired in part by the Tarzan films, was a commercial success, although it may now be lost.

== Plot ==
Pirates have begun roaming through the Strait of Malacca, robbing ships and killing their crews and passengers. On one ship, three children survive: Maryam (Dewi Mada), who is captured and forced to live with the pirate captain (Bissoe), and brother and sister Daud (Mohammad Mochtar) and Rusna (Hadidjah), who escape to the jungle. Fifteen years later Rusna meets with the soldier Ali (Ferry Kock), who falls in love with her; meanwhile, Daud has fallen in love with Maryam, who serves as a dancer for the pirate captain. Ali and Daud go to the pirate ship and kill the crew; Ali takes out the captain with his rencong (an Acehnese dagger). They are able to live in peace, no longer fearing pirates.

== Production ==
Rentjong Atjeh was written by Ferry Kock, a former member of the Dardanella touring troupe who had recently returned from the United States. His wife, Dewi Mada, starred in the film; other actors included Kock, Mohammad Mochtar, Hadidjah, and Bissoe. The arrival of Kock and Mada continued a trend of theatrical personnel migrating to film following the success of Albert Balink's 1937 film Terang Boelan (Full Moon); this migration also saw figures like Andjar and Ratna Asmara, as well as Fifi Young and her husband Njoo Cheong Seng, join the industry.

The Teng Chun, the owner of the Java Industrial Film (JIF), served as both producer and director; Kock had originally been asked to direct but was unable to perform. The's brothers worked on the film as well: The Teng Liong served as sound director, while The Teng Hwi was cinematographer. Mas Sardi wrote and conducted several songs for the production, including "Oh Ajah dan Iboekoe" ("Oh My Father and Mother") and "Akoe Ta' Sangka" ("I Never Expected").

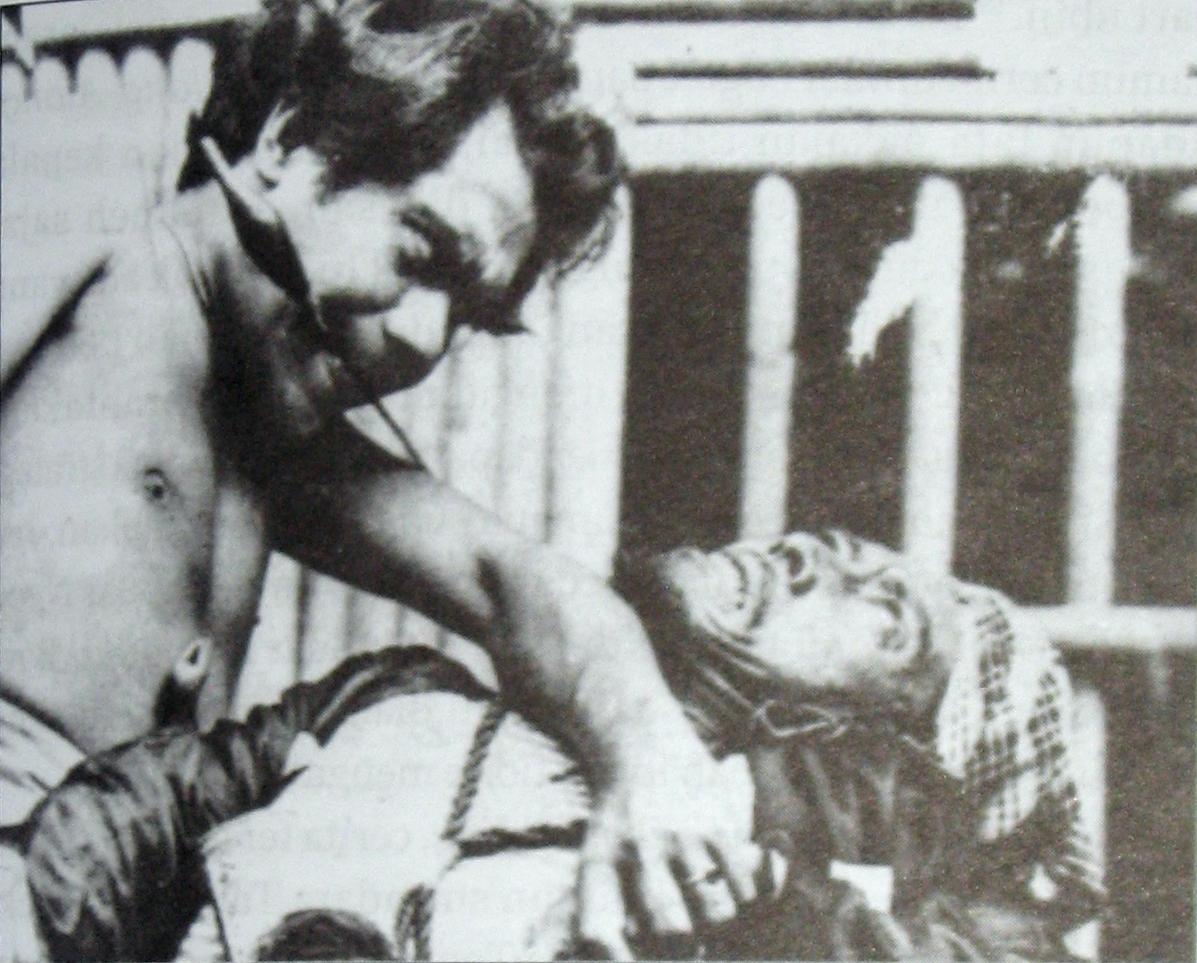
Ferry Kock biting a rencong, which was inspired by the contemporary Tarzan films.

The film was shot in black-and-white. As the Dutch East Indies government was preparing for an expected war with Japan following the German invasion of the Netherlands, the crew was not allowed to shoot scenes at sea. Instead, scenes showing the pirates were shot at the shore of an inlet in Batavia (modern day Jakarta). Other scenes used unused footage from The's previous work Alang-Alang (Grass; 1939). Some scenes were inspired by Hollywood films; a scene where Ferry Kock's character bites a rencong during a fight, for example, was inspired by a scene in Tarzan films; Alang-Alang and the later film Poetri Rimba (Jungle Princess; 1941) also drew inspiration from the series.

== Release ==
Rentjong Atjeh was premiered in 1940 at the Sampoerna Theater in Surabaya, and was screened on 13 August 1940 at Rex Theater. Before that, the film's story had been serialised and the sheet music for its soundtrack was published as a promotional booklet. The film was also screened in British Malaya, where it was advertised as "the first great Malay historical drama".

Rentjong Atjeh was a commercial success, which the Indonesian film historian Misbach Yusa Biran credits to Andjar Asmara's marketing skills, and inspired Njoo Cheong Seng to created Zoebaida (1940). Following this, JIF began regularly publishing a promotional magazine titled JIF Journal which carried information on its upcoming productions. The film was criticized by journalist due to the careless selection of sets such as the robber chief's hut which has a tiled floor, and the costumes that did not match the theme except for the robber chief's costume. The Teng Chun later admitted that the film was a mess but successful in marketing because of good publicity due to Andjar Asmara's advice.

Rentjong Atjeh is likely a lost film. The American visual anthropologist Karl G. Heider writes that all Indonesian films from before 1950 are lost. However, JB Kristanto's Katalog Film Indonesia (Indonesian Film Catalogue) records several as having survived at Sinematek Indonesia's archives, and Biran writes that several Japanese propaganda films have survived at the Netherlands Government Information Service.
