= Mohamad Mochtar =

Indonesian film actor

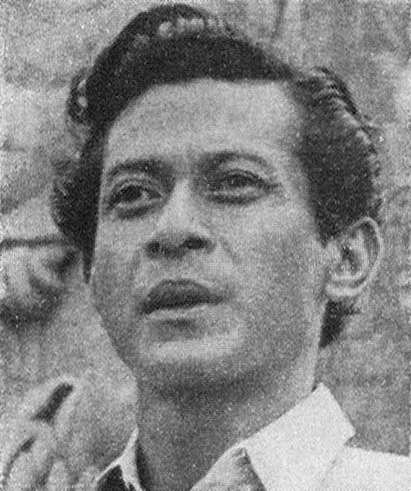
- Mohamad Mochtar, 1954
- Born: 1 July 1918; Cianjur, Dutch East Indies
- Died: 1 December 1981 (aged 63); Jakarta, Indonesia
- Occupation: Actor
- Awards: 1 Citra Award

Mohamad Mochtar (1 July 1918 – 1 December 1981), usually credited as Moh Mochtar, was an Indonesian film actor active from 1939 until his death in 1981.

== Biography ==
Mochtar was born in Cianjur, West Java, Dutch East Indies, on 1 July 1918. He dropped out of school in the first year of Meer Uitgebreid Lager Onderwijs (junior high school). Sometime afterwards he was signed by the theatre company Miss Riboet's Orion for their football team; he had been a fan of the game since his youth. Mochtar was later asked to perform on stage. By the late 1930s he was skilled at the traditional martial art of silat.

In 1939 Mochtar met The Teng Chun, owner and director of Java Industrial Film (JIF), while at a barbershop. Mochtar was signed to play opposite Hadidjah in JIF's upcoming film, Alang-Alang, as two lovers who confront bandits in a jungle. The Teng Chun intended Mohamad Mochtar and Hadidjah to become competitors to Roekiah and Rd Mochtar, who had become a popular on-screen couple owing to their success in Terang Boelan (1937) and Fatima (1938). Alang-Alang was successful, and Mohamad Mochtar was dubbed the "Tarzan of Java".

This success led Hadidjah and Mochtar to be cast in romantic roles together for another five films for JIF. In 1940, Mochtar appeared in Matjan Berbisik (Whispering Tiger) as a man who fights his brother for the love of a young woman, then in Rentjong Atjeh (Rencong of Aceh) as a young man who fights pirates. In 1941 the pair appeared in another three films: Srigala Item (Black Wolf), Si Gomar, and Singa Laoet. Aside from his roles with Hadidjah, Mochtar also acted in several films for Action Films, a subsidiary of JIF, including Srigala Item and Tengkorak Hidoep (both 1941). Through these films Mochtar became one of the most famous actors in the Indies, recognised for his speed and courage. He did his own stunts — including scenes such as jumping from a moving motorcycle to a truck.

In March 1942, the Japanese occupied the Indies and closed all but one film studio, including JIF. Mochtar became a Heiho, a native soldier for the Japanese forces, and took up roles in propaganda films such as Berdjoang (1943). Indonesia proclaimed its independence on 17 August 1945, and for two years no fiction films were produced in the area. Mochtar made his first film after the proclamation, Bengawan Solo, in 1949.

Through the 1950s Mochtar acted in various films, and worked as cinematographer on two. He left the industry in 1957. He attempted to work at a shoe factory, then tried to open his own hotel and restaurant. In 1967 he returned to film, acting in Menjusurui Djedjak Berdarah; this role garnered him a Citra Award for Best Supporting Actor at the 1967 Indonesian Film Festival. After his return to film Mochtar focused primarily on supporting roles, only taking two further lead roles: in Lampu Merah (1971) and Gara Gara (1973). At the 1979 Indonesian Film Festival he received a special award, the Pikiran Rakyat Trophy, for his lengthy career. Mochtar died in Jakarta on 1 December 1981.

== Filmography ==
During his 42-year career, Mochtar appeared in some 63 films. He also handled cinematography on 2 films.

=== Cast ===
- Alang-Alang (1939)
- Rentjong Atjeh (1940)
- Dasima (1940)
- Matjan Berbisik (1940)
- Matula (1941)
- Si Gomar (1941)
- Singa Laoet (1941)
- Srigala Item (1941)
- Tengkorak Hidoep (1941)
- Boenga Sembodja (1942)
- Poelo Inten (1942)
- Berdjoang (1943)
- Di Desa (1943)
- Keseberang (1944)
- Bengawan Solo (1949)
- Bantam (1950)
- Pantai Bahagia (1950)
- Terang Bulan (1950)
- Tirtonadi (1950)
- Air Mata Pengantin (1952)
- Neng Yatimah (1953)
- Timuriana (1953)
- Djaja Merana (1954)
- Sungai Darah (1954)
- Bandar Djakarta (1955)
- Korupsi (1956)
- Teladan (1957)
- Menjusuri Djedjak Berdarah (1967)
- Djampang Mentjari Naga Hitam (1968)
- Apa jang Kau Tjari, Palupi? (1969)
- Kutukan Dewata (1970)
- Samiun dan Dasima (1970)
- Si Buta dari Gua Hantu (1970)
- Api Dibukit Menoreh (Gugurnya Tohpati) (1971)
- La Tando di Toradja (1971)
- Lampu Merah (1971)
- Impas (0 x 0) (1971)
- Pendekar Bambu Kuning (1971)
- Pendekar Sumur Tudjuh (1971)
- Perawan Buta (1971)
- Mutiara dalam Lumpur (1972)
- Salah Asuhan (1972)
- Gara-gara (1973)
- Ratapan Anak Tiri (1973)
- Anak yang Menderita (1974)
- Pengorbanan (1974)
- Sarah (1974)
- Apa Salahku (1976)
- Tanah Harapan (1976)
- Ingin Cepat Kaya (Babi Jadi-jadian) (1976)
- Mustika Ibu (1976)
- Cobra (1977)
- Terminal Terakhir (1977)
- Tiada Seindah Cintamu (1977)
- Pendekar Tangan Hitam (1977)
- M-5 (Menantang Maut) (1978)
- Pulau Cinta (1978)
- Pacar Seorang Perjaka (1978)
- Anak-anak Buangan (1979)
- Ach yang Benerrr... (1979)
- Detik-detik Cinta Menyentuh (1981)
- Bunga Cinta Kasih (1981)
- Apanya Dong (1983)

=== Crew ===
- Air Mata Pengantin (Tears of a Bride; 1952) - Cinematographer
- Tirtonadi (1950) - Cinematographer

== Works cited ==
- Apa Siapa Orang Film Indonesia [What and Who: Film Figures in Indonesia] (in Indonesian). Jakarta: Indonesian Ministry of Information. 1999. OCLC 44427179.
- Biran, Misbach Yusa, ed. (1979). Apa Siapa Orang Film Indonesia 1926–1968 [What and Who: Film Figures in Indonesia, 1926–1968]. Sinematek Indonesia. OCLC 6655859.
- Biran, Misbach Yusa (2009). Sejarah Film 1900-1950: Bikin Film di Jawa [History of Film 1900-1950: Making Films in Java] (in Indonesian). Komunitas Bamboo working with the Jakarta Art Council. ISBN 978-979-3731-58-2.
- "Filmografi Moh Mochtar" [Filmography of Moh Mochtar]. filmindonesia.or.id. Jakarta: Konfiden Foundation. Archived from the original on 12 January 2014.
- Imanjaya, Ekky (2006). A to Z about Indonesian Film (in Indonesian). Bandung: Mizan. ISBN 978-979-752-367-1.
- "Matjan Berbisik". filmindonesia.or.id (in Indonesian). Jakarta: Konfiden Foundation. Archived from the original on 2 December 2013.
- "Penghargaan Moh Mochtar" [Awards for Moh Mochtar]. filmindonesia.or.id. Jakarta: Konfiden Foundation. Archived from the original on 12 January 2014.
- "Rentjong Atjeh". filmindonesia.or.id. Jakarta: Konfiden Foundation. Archived from the original on 16 October 2013.
