= Sardi (musician) =

Indonesian composer and musician

- Born: December 1910; Yogyakarta, Dutch East Indies
- Died: 21 October 1953 (aged 42); Jakarta, Indonesia
- Spouse: Hadidjah
- Children: Idris Sardi

Mas Sardi (December 1910 – 21 October 1953) was an Indonesian composer and musician notable for being the country's first professional music supervisor. He and his wife Hadidjah were the parents of Citra Award-winning musician Idris Sardi.

== Biography ==
Sardi was born in December 1910 in Yogyakarta, Dutch East Indies, as the son of Soekamto, a musician. He was educated at a Lagere School, but also studied the violin with his father, the leader of the Norma Orchestra in the palace of Sultan Hamengkubuwono VII. Sardi was later sent to study with other men, including one named Fernando and another named Jonocy; the latter of the two was the leader of an orchestra which played at the local society building. Sardi played for Jonocy, but eventually left to tour Central Java with Kunstkring; he would sometimes lead the orchestra at the Sultan's palace, if his father was unavailable.

In 1936 Sardi migrated to Jakarta to join the Faroka troupe, whose members included Roekiah and her husband Kartolo. He transferred to the Sweet Java Opera in 1937. By 1939 he had married Hadidjah and had a son, Idris. That year he was asked by The Teng Chun of Java Industrial Film to join the company as a music director. Sardi accepted the offer, becoming the first professional music supervisor in the Indies. Hadidjah, meanwhile, was signed as an actress.

Sardi made his debut as music supervisor with JIF's 1939 hit Alang-Alang. Hadidjah co-starred in the film with Mohamad Mochtar, in an attempt to challenge the supercouple of Roekiah and Rd Mochtar, who were signed to Tan's Film. Alang-Alang was a massive commercial hit in the Indies and nearby British Malaya, and the Indonesian film historian Misbach Yusa Biran credits it as one of the causes of the revival the domestic film industry underwent in 1940. During the next two years Sardi prepared music for several more JIF productions, including Rentjong Atjeh, Srigala Item, and Matula.

The Japanese occupied the Dutch East Indies in March 1942, closing all but one film studio; this included JIF. During the three-year occupation Sardi played for the Japanese backed radio. On 17 August 1945 Indonesia proclaimed its independence, and by the end of the year the returning Dutch colonial government had occupied the capital, Jakarta. Sardi refused to work for the Dutch, instead playing for tips at restaurants, bars, and weddings.

After the Republican government reoccupied the capital, Sardi again worked for the radio, under the leadership of Sjaiful Bachri. He died in Jakarta on 21 October 1953, aged 42. He was survived by his wife and son; Hadidjah acted in several further films before her death in 2013, while Idris garnered numerous Citra Awards for his film scores.

== Filmography ==
Sardi served as music supervisor for at least seven films.

- Alang-Alang (1939)
- Rentjong Atjeh (1940)
- Matjan Berbisik (1940)
- Melati van Agam (1940)
- Si Gomar (1941)
- Srigala Item (1941)
- Matula (1941)

== Works cited ==
- Apa Siapa Orang Film Indonesia [What and Who: Film Figures in Indonesia] (in Indonesian). Jakarta: Indonesian Ministry of Information. 1999. OCLC 44427179.
- Biran, Misbach Yusa, ed. (1979). Apa Siapa Orang Film Indonesia 1926–1978 [What and Who: Film Figures in Indonesia, 1926–1978]. Sinematek Indonesia. OCLC 6655859.
- Biran, Misbach Yusa (2009). Sejarah Film 1900-1950: Bikin Film di Jawa [History of Film 1900-1950: Making Films in Java] (in Indonesian). Komunitas Bamboo working with the Jakarta Art Council. ISBN 978-979-3731-58-2.
- "Filmografi Hadidjah" [Filmography for Hadidjah]. filmindonesia.or.id (in Indonesian). Jakarta: Konfiden Foundation. Archived from the original on 2 January 2014.
