= Tengkorak Hidoep =

1941 film by Tan Tjoei Hock

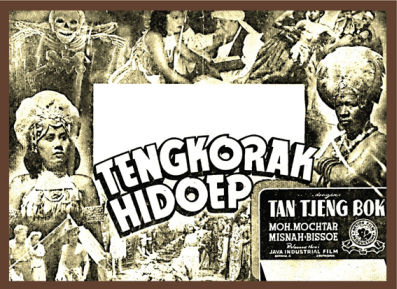
- Poster
- Directed by: Tan Tjoei Hock
- Written by: Tan Tjoei Hock
- Produced by: The Teng Chun
- Starring: Tan Tjeng Bok; Moh Mochtar; Misnahati; Bissu
- Cinematography: Tan Tjoei Hock
- Production company: Action Film
- Release date: 1941 (Dutch East Indies)
- Country: Dutch East Indies
- Language: Malay

Tengkorak Hidoep (lit. 'The Living Skeleton') is a 1941 film from the Dutch East Indies (now Indonesia) directed by Tan Tjoei Hock. It has been called Indonesia's first domestic horror film.

== Plot ==
Raden Darmadji and several of his friends travel to the island of Mustika in search of Darmadji's brother, who was lost in a shipwreck ten years earlier. There, they discover that the god Maha Daru was locked away on the island 2,000 years ago after losing a battle to the goddess Gumba. While exploring a cave, Darmadji notices a huge rainstorm. The earth rips asunder, and Maha Daru escapes from his prison.

As Darmadji tries to flee the cage, he is confronted by savage men and supernatural beings. His daughter, Rumiati, also becomes entangled in this apocalypse but is seemingly rescued by Maha Daru. However, Maha Daru's ill will toward Rumiati—whom he considers a reincarnation of Gumba—soon becomes clear. A man living in the jungle rescues her, and they fall in love.

== Production ==
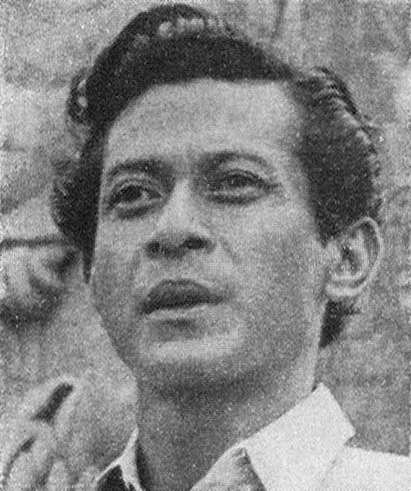
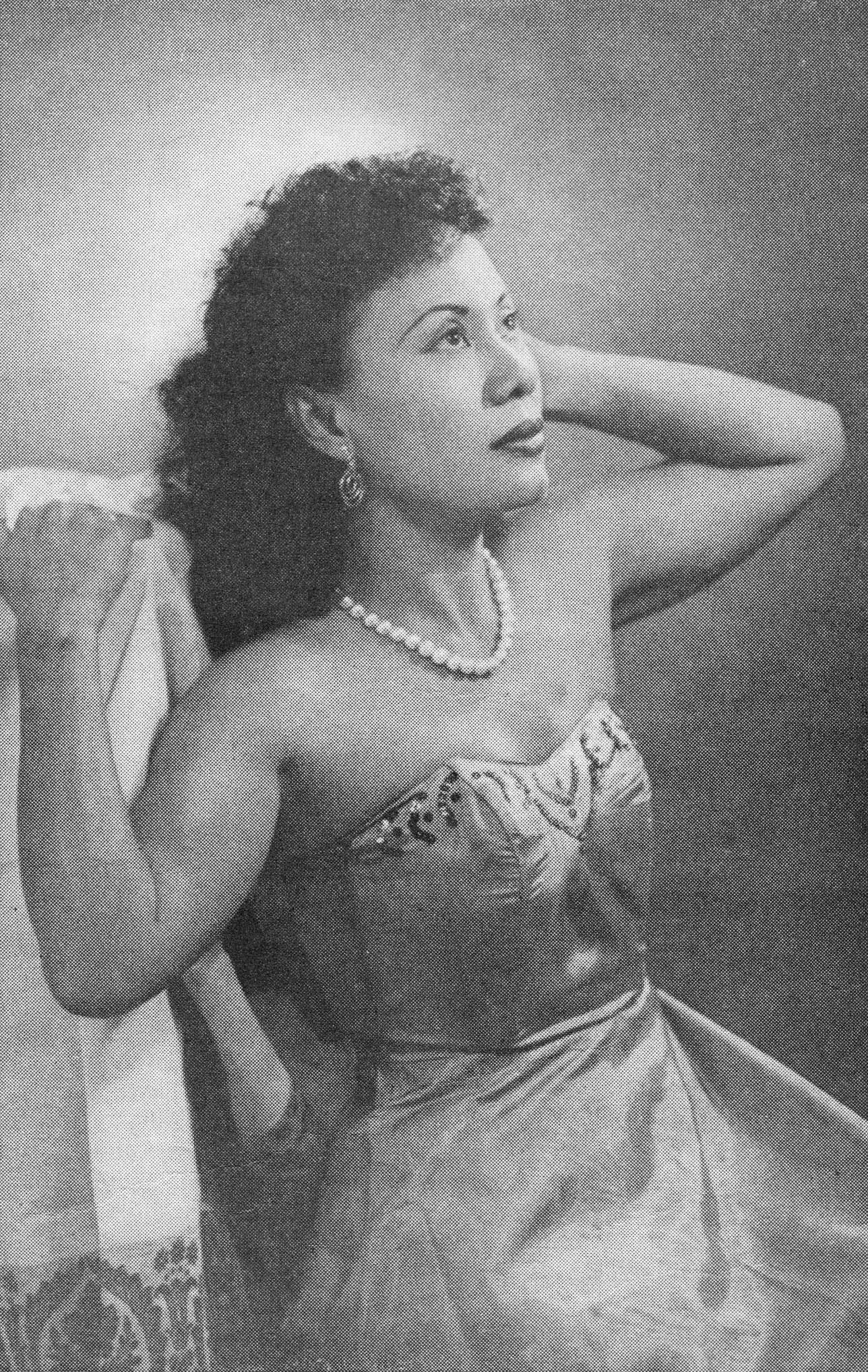
Moh Mochtar and Misnahati, the film's stars

The black-and-white film production begin in October 1941 and was written, shot, and directed by Tan Tjoei Hock, with Java Industrial Film's The Teng Chun as producer; it was Tan's last film as director. It starred Tan Tjeng Bok, Moh Mochtar, Misnahati, Bissu, and Ali Joego.

Salim Said, writing in 1981, stated that Tengkorak Hidoep was influenced by previous film adaptations of Bram Stoker's Dracula, while Ade Irwansyah of Tabloid Bintang suggested that the dominance of the jungle scenes was inspired by the various films centred on Edgar Rice Burroughs's Tarzan.

== Release and reception ==
Tengkorak Hidoep was released in 1941 and reportedly a commercial success. Tan credited this success on the film's special effects, including a scene in which lightning smashes Maha Daru's grave and he comes out, a living skull, surrounded by flames. A 35 mm copy of the film is reportedly stored at Sinematek Indonesia in Jakarta.

Several articles, including one in the Indonesian film magazine F and the entertainment publication Tabloid Bintang, write that Tengkorak Hidoep was the first Indonesian horror film. However, other publications, such as JB Kristanto's Katalog Film Indonesia (Indonesian Film Catalogue), consider the 1971 psychological horror film Lisa the first true Indonesian horror film; in Kristanto's catalogue, Tengkorak Hidoep is considered an adventure film. By the late 2000s, horror films had become one of the dominant genres in the Indonesian film industry.
