= Sardis, West Virginia =

Unincorporated community in West Virginia, US

Coordinates: 39°20′15″N 80°25′04″W

Sardis is an unincorporated community in Sardis District, Harrison County, West Virginia, United States. It is situated near Katys Lick Creek.

== History ==
A post office called Sardis was established in 1852, and remained in operation until 1908. In 1872, the village gave its name to the surrounding county district under the new state constitution. The name "Sardis" probably derives from the ancient town of Sardis, now in Turkey.
