= Sardi-ye Shahabad =

Sardi-ye Shahabad سردي شاه اباد
- Village
- Location within Iran
- Coordinates: 27°51′28″N 58°15′27″E
- Country: Iran
- Province: Kerman
- County: Rudbar-e Jonubi
- Bakhsh: Central
- Rural District: Nehzatabad

Population (2006)
  - Total: 916
- Time zone: UTC+3:30 (IRST)
  - Summer (DST): UTC+4:30 (IRDT)

Sardi-ye Shahabad (Persian: سردي شاه اباد, also Romanized as Sardī-ye Shāhābād; also known as Sardī) is a village in Nehzatabad Rural District, in the Central District of Rudbar-e Jonubi County, Kerman Province, Iran. At the 2006 census, its population was 916, in 169 families.
