= Idris Sardi =

Indonesian violinist and composer

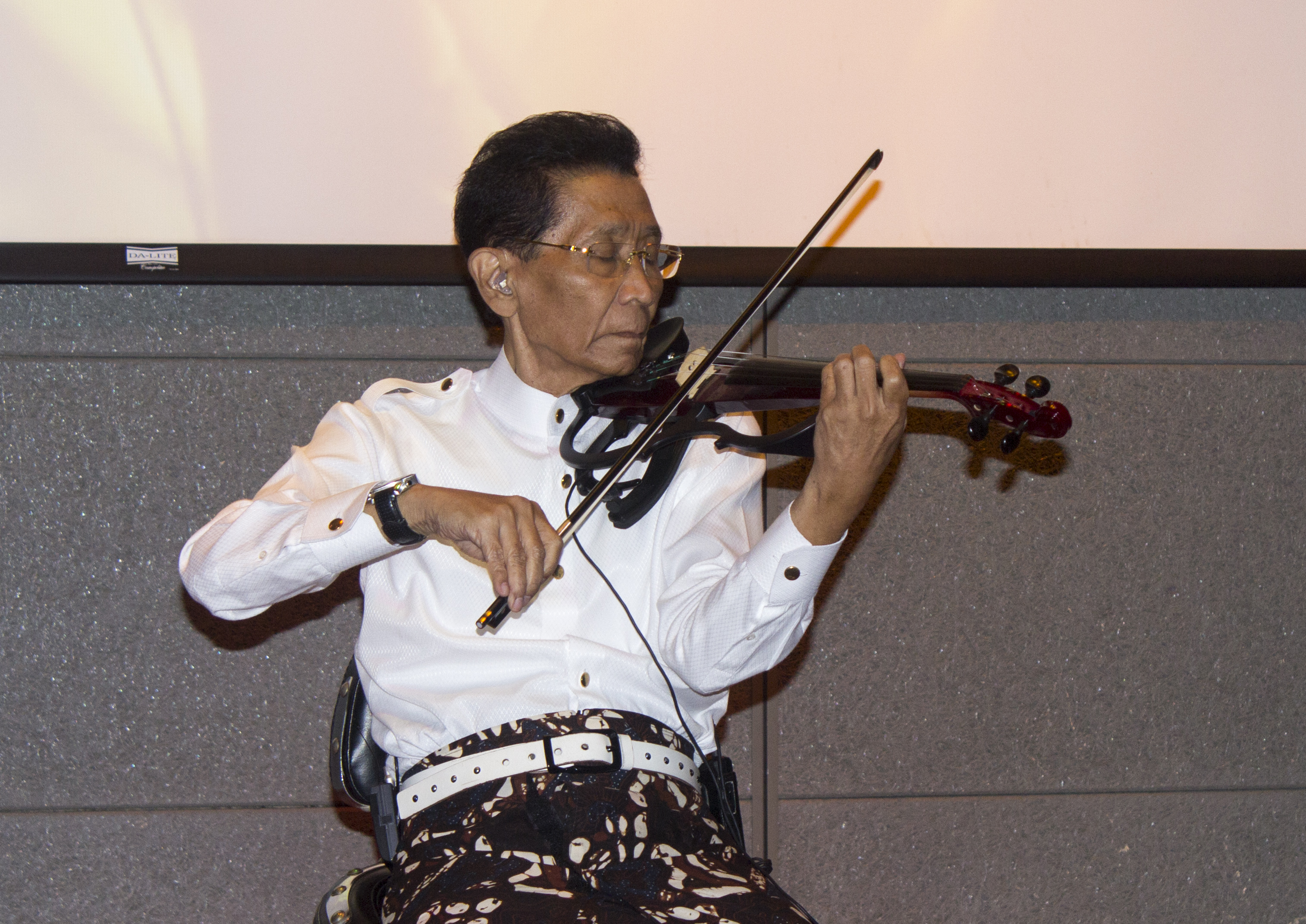
- Born: Muhammad Idris Sardi; June 7, 1938; Batavia, Dutch East Indies
- Died: April 28, 2014 (aged 75); Cibubur, Indonesia
- Occupation: Violinist
- Children: Lukman Sardi
- Parents: Mas Sardi (father); Hadidjah (mother)

Muhammad Idris Sardi (June 7, 1938 – April 28, 2014) was an Indonesian violinist and composer.

Idris Sardi was born on June 7, 1938, to Sardi, an Indonesian composer, and Hadidjah, an Indonesian actress.

Idris learned to play the violin when he was six years old. At age 10, he performed in public for the first time in Yogyakarta in 1949. His performance garnered attention due to his undoubted talent.

Idris was also widely known as a talented composer. He was awarded the prestigious Citra Award for best sound in several movies, namely Pengantin Remaja (Young Newlyweds) in 1971, Perkawinan (Marriage) in 1973, Cinta Pertama (First Love) in 1974, and Doea Tanda Mata (Two Mementos) in 1985. Idris composed around 1,900 songs, four of which won Piala Citra awards for Best Film Score in the 1970s and 1980s.

Idris is father of actress Santi Sardi and actor Lukman Sardi, from his marriage with Zerlita. After divorcing his second wife, Indonesian actress Marini, Idris married Ratih Putri.

Sardi died on April 28, 2014, at Meilia Hospital in Cibubur, Indonesia. He was 75.
