= Sardis Baptist Church =

Sardis Baptist Church may refer to:

- Sardis Baptist Church (Birmingham, Alabama), listed on the NRHP in Alabama
- Sardis Baptist Church (Union Springs, Alabama), listed on the NRHP in Alabama
- Sardis Baptist Church (Chattoogaville, Georgia), listed on the NRHP in Georgia
- Sardis Primitive Baptist Church in Madison, North Carolina
