= Sardu =

Sardu may refer to:

- Sardinian language, language of the island of Sardinia
- Someone from the island of Sardinia
- Şardu, a village in Sânpaul Commune, Cluj County, Romania
- Șardu, a tributary of the Valea Mare in Cluj County, Romania
- Master Sardu, a character from the 1976 film Bloodsucking Freaks
