= Deh-e Sardi =

Deh-e Sardi ده ساردي
- Village
- Location within Iran
- Coordinates: 30°25′50″N 56°36′53″E
- Country: Iran
- Province: Kerman
- County: Rafsanjan
- Bakhsh: Central
- Rural District: Khenaman

Population (2006)
  - Total: 29
- Time zone: UTC+3:30 (IRST)
  - Summer (DST): UTC+4:30 (IRDT)

Deh-e Sardi (Persian: ده ساردي, also Romanized as Deh-e Sārdī; also known as Darsārdi and Dasārdi) is a village in Khenaman Rural District, in the Central District of Rafsanjan County, Kerman Province, Iran. At the 2006 census, its population was 29, in 9 families.
