= Java Industrial Film =

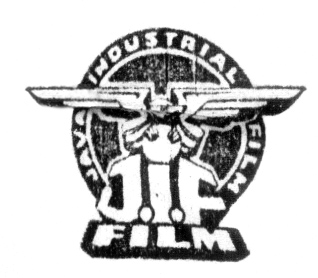
JIF logo

Java Industrial Film (JIF) was a film company on the island of Java in the Dutch East Indies (Indonesia). It was established by The Teng Chun. It lasted 13 years before closing in 1942 during the archipelago's occupation by Japan's military.

The film company was preceded by The's Cino Motion Pictures. It catered to Indonesian audiences while The had earlier made film adaptions of Chinese legends. In 1935, The built a studio for his film company near his home in North Batavia.

== Filmography ==
- Boenga Roos dari Tjikembang (1931)
- Sam Pek Eng Tay (1931)
- Ouw Peh Tjoa (1934)
- Gadis jang Terdjoeal (1937)
- Oh Iboe (1938)
- Alang-Alang (1939)
- Roesia si Pengkor (1939)
- Alang-Alang (1939)
- Dasima (1940)
- Kartinah (1940)
- Rentjong Atjeh (1940)
- Matula (1941)
- Moestika dari Djemar (1941)
- Noesa Penida (1941)
- Si Gomar (1941)
- Singa Laoet (1941)
- Sorga Palsoe (1941)
- Srigala Item (1941)

== See also ==
- Batavia
- Indonesian cinema
