= Alang-Alang (film) =

- Theatrical poster
- Directed by: The Teng Chun
- Written by: The Teng Chun
- Produced by: The Teng Chun
- Starring: Mohamad Mochtar; Hadidjah; Bissoe
- Music by: Mas Sardi
- Production company: Java Industrial Film
- Release date: 1939 (Dutch East Indies)
- Country: Dutch East Indies (now Indonesia)
- Language: Malay

Alang-Alang (taken from the Indonesian word for blady grass) is a 1939 film from the Dutch East Indies. Starring Mohamad Mochtar and Hadidjah, it follows a young man in his quest to rescue his love from a bandit. Inspired by the Tarzan film series and shot in a period of one month with borrowed animals, the film was a commercial success and credited as a factor in the solidification of the Indies' film industry, as well as helping jump start the Malaysian and Singaporean ones.

== Plot ==
Suhiyat (Mohamad Mochtar), a young man who enjoys partying, is sent to manage a coconut plantation. He stays with a young widow named Rasmina (Lena) and falls in love with a local girl named Surati (Hadidjah); Rasmina, who is loved by Karta (Musa), also falls in love with Suhiyat. Meanwhile, a local thug named Rainan (Bissoe) has also fallen in love with Surati. To ensure success with Suhiyat, Rasmina pays Rainan to marry Surati. When Surati refuses, however, Rainan kidnaps her and escapes by boat. Their boat sinks and the two wash ashore on an island, not knowing that the other has survived. Surati befriends the local beasts, while Rainan finds other criminals and becomes their leader.

The loss of Surati makes Suhiyat feel depressed, which results in Rasmina feeling guilty over her actions. She is able to discover where Rainan and Surati are, and is able to command the local elephants to prevent Rainan's men from kidnapping Surati again. Meanwhile, Suhiyat has also come to the island and finds Surati. The two speak in the forest, but more of Rainan's men appear and kidnap Surati.

To rescue her, Suhiyat poses as a bandit and sneaks into the criminals' camp. He finds Surati and rescues her, only to be confronted by Rainan. After a ferocious struggle, Surati and Suhiyat escape into the forest, followed by Rainan and his men. As it appears they will be captured, Rasmina appears with some police, who capture the bandits. Rasmina tells Suhiyat that his father has died and left him a large inheritance. Suhiyat marries Surati, while Rasmina marries Karta.

== Production ==
Alang-Alang was produced by Java Industrial Film under The Teng Chun. The Teng Chun was inspired by the coming of a circus from Hong Kong to Batavia (modern-day Jakarta); he decided to take advantage of the publicity around the circus' arrival. As the Tarzan film series was popular at the time, he conceived of a jungle film. The animals in the film, including a leopard, were loaned from the circus for one month. The short loan led to an emphasis on speed during the production, with The Teng Chun as director and producer. The film's soundtrack was provided by Mas Sardi.

The cast stage actor Musa in the role of Karta, then went looking for a person to play Suhiyat. He met with Mohamad Mochtar, a football player skilled at silat, at a barbershop in Cianjur. The star of one of The Teng Chun's earlier productions, Bissoe, was cast as Rainan. The latter attempted to establish Mochtar and Hadijah as a celebrity couple, in competition with Raden Mochtar and Roekiah of Tan's Film.

== Release and reception ==
Alang-Alang was released in November 1939 and advertised as the country's first jungle film; its screenings continued into 1940. Alang-Alang was a commercial success in both the Indies and British Malaya. This led to Mochtar receiving the nickname Tarzan van Java (Tarzan of Java) and signing with Java Industrial Film for future roles. Shots from Alang-Alang were later reused for the 1940 film Rentjong Atjeh, another Java Industrial Film production featuring Mohamad Mochtar.

The film historian Misbach Yusa Biran credits the success of Alang-Alang and the earlier films Terang Boelan (1937) and Fatima (1938) as solidifying the film industry of the Dutch East Indies, while the scholar of Malaysian culture Khoo Gaik Cheng credits it and Terang Boelan with jump starting the Malaysian and Singaporean film industries. Alang-Alang was among the first films in the country to be heavily influenced by Western works; other such films included Kedok Ketawa (1940) and Tengkorak Hidoep (1941), both influenced by Bram Stoker's Dracula.

== See also ==
- List of films of the Dutch East Indies
