= The Teng Chun =

Indonesian film director

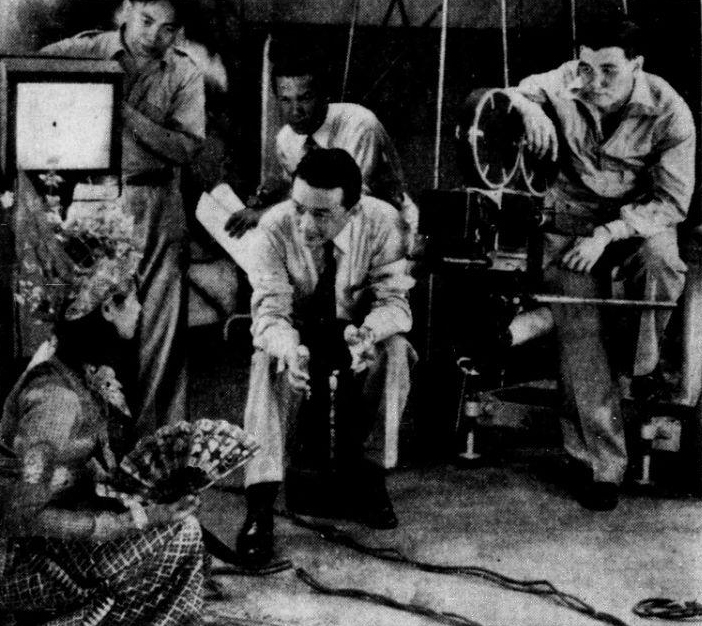
- The (center), c. 1940
- Born: 18 June 1902; Batavia, Dutch East Indies
- Died: 25 February 1977 (aged 74); Djakarta, Indonesia
- Occupation: Filmmaker
- Years active: 1930–1955
- Notable work: Boenga Roos dari Tjikembang; Alang-Alang

The Teng Chun (Chinese: 鄭丁春; pinyin: Zhèng Dīngchūn; Pe̍h-ōe-jī: Tēⁿ Teng-chhun; 18 June 1902 – 25 February 1977), also known by his Indonesian name Tahjar Ederis, was a film producer in the Dutch East Indies. Born to a wealthy businessman, The became interested in film while still a youth. After a period as an exporter, in 1930 he established Cino Motion Picture to produce films in the Dutch East Indies. In a little over a decade he and his company had released at least 31 films, including some of the country's first talkies. Although he experienced a brief resurgence during the 1950s after Indonesia became independent, he spent the last years of his life as an English teacher.

== Biography ==
He was born in Batavia, Dutch East Indies (modern day Jakarta, Indonesia) on 18 June 1902 to a wealthy businessman, The Kim Ie. As a child he studied at a Tiong Hoa Hwee Koan school.

The studied economics in the United States beginning in 1920. However, instead of following his father's footsteps, The studied filmmaking at the Palmer Play Theater; one of his fellow film students was Fred Young, another peranakan Chinese from the Indies, who would collaborate with The. While in the US The worked towards convincing his father to become a film importer; the elder The initially refused, but eventually agreed to his son's proposal.

After five years of studies The went to Shanghai and became involved in the country's cinema industry, working on exporting films from China to the Indies and trying his hand at filmmaking. He returned to the Indies in 1930, after Shanghai-produced films became less popular. In the Indies, The – despite his father insisting that importing films was more profitable – established Cino Motion Pictures. The nation's cinema was still in its infancy; the first locally produced feature film, Loetoeng Kasaroeng, had been released in 1926, and there were only three other film production companies in the country.

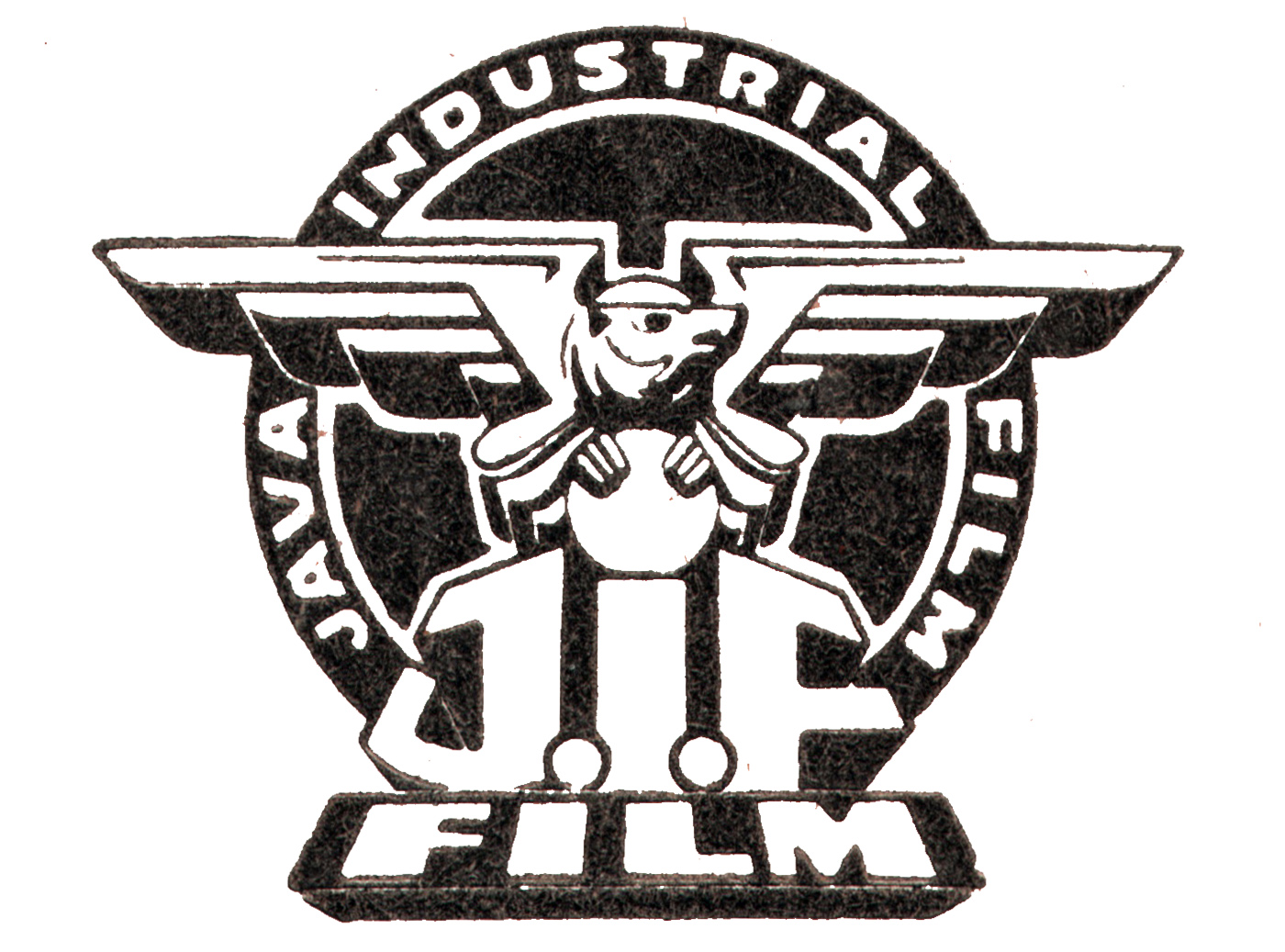
Logo of The's Java Industrial Film

The studio's first release, Boenga Roos dari Tjikembang, was among the first talkies produced in the country, but a critical failure. The followed this with several further releases, including the commercial success Sam Pek Eng Tay. From 1933 until early 1935, all feature films from the Dutch East Indies were produced by The, partly because of the Great Depression and partly because of the difficulties and financial burdens caused by transitioning from silent films to talkies. These stories were based on Chinese mythology or martial arts, and targeted at lower-class audiences, generally ethnic Chinese.

In 1935 the company's name changed to Java Industrial Film (JIF) and The brought his siblings into the business, which became increasingly active. Teng Gan became general assistant, Teng Liong was put in charge of sound, and Teng Hwie was tasked as a cameraman. By 1938 JIF had begun focusing on stories dealing with modern issues, possibly in response to Albert Balink's 1938 film Pareh.

Java Industrial Film closed during the Japanese occupation, starting in 1942. During the occupation The worked for a period in a theatrical group, but he found it unfulfilling and left soon afterwards.

After Indonesia's independence and the cease of the National Revolution, he and Fred Young established the Bintang Soerabaja film company, which continued production until 1962. After the studio closed, The became an English teacher and, in 1967, changed his name to Tahjar Ederis.

The died on 25 February 1977 in Jakarta. He received an award from the capital's governor shortly before his death.

== Filmography ==
During his career The released at least 34 films, as follows:

- Boenga Roos dari Tjikembang (Rose from Cikembang; 1931) – as producer, director, sound editor, and cinematographer
- Sam Pek Eng Tay (The Butterfly Lovers; 1931) – as producer, director, sound editor, cinematographer, and screenwriter
- Pat Kiam Hap (Eight Swordsmen; 1933) – as producer, director, sound editor, cinematographer, and screenwriter
- Pat Bie To (Eight Beautiful Women; 1933) – as producer, director, and cinematographer
- Ouw Peh Tjoa (Black and White Snakes; 1934) – as producer, director, sound editor, and cinematographer
- Tie Pat Kai Kawin (Tie Pat Kai Marries; 1935) – as producer, director, sound editor, cinematographer, and screenwriter
- Pan Sie Tong (1935) – as producer and director
- Ang Hai Djie (1935) – as producer, director, and cinematographer
- Pembakaran Bio "Hong Lian Sie" (Burning of the "Hong Lian Sie"; 1936) – as producer and director
- Lima Siloeman Tikoes (Five Mouse Demons; 1936) – as producer and director
- Anaknja Siloeman Oeler Poeti (Child of the White Snake; 1936) – as producer and director
- Gadis jang Terdjoeal (The Sold Maiden; 1937) – as producer and director
- Tjiandjoer (Cianjur; 1938) – as director
- Oh Iboe (Oh Mother; 1938) – as director
- Roesia si Pengkor (1939) – as producer and director
- Alang-Alang (Grass; 1939) – as producer, director, and screenwriter
- Melati van Agam (Jasmine of Agam; 1940) – as producer
- Matjan Berbisik (Whispering Tiger; 1940) – as producer
- Kartinah (1940) – as producer
- Dasima (1940) – as producer
- Rentjong Atjeh (Rencong of Aceh; 1940) – as producer and director
- Tengkorak Hidoep (Living Skull; 1941) – as producer
- Srigala Item (Black Wolf; 1941) – as producer
- Si Gomar (1941) – as producer
- Singa Laoet (Lion of the Sea; 1941) – as producer
- Ratna Moetoe Manikam (1941) – as producer
- Elang Darat (Land Hawk; 1941) – as producer
- Poetri Rimba (Daughter of the Jungle; 1941) – as producer
- Noesa Penida (1941) – as producer
- Matula (1941) – as producer
- Djantoeng Hati (Heart and Soul; 1941) – as cinematographer
- Konde Tjioda (1954) – as producer
- Dinamika (Dynamics; 1955) – as producer
- Genangan Air Mata (Puddle of Tears; 1955) – as director

== See also ==
- List of films of the Dutch East Indies
