= Sinematek Indonesia =

Film archive in Jakarta, Indonesia

Sinematek Indonesia logo

Sinematek Indonesia, or Sinematek for short, is a film archive located in Jakarta. Established in 1975 by Misbach Yusa Biran and Asrul Sani, the archive was the first in Southeast Asia, and remains the only one in Indonesia. It is home to roughly 2,700 films, mostly Indonesian, and also houses numerous reference works. Since 2001 it has been underfunded.

== Description ==
Sinematek is located in the Hajji Usmar Ismail Center, a five-story building located on Rasuna Said Street in Kuningan, South Jakarta, and managed by the Usmar Ismail Foundation; it has held this location since 1977. The Sinematek offices are on the fourth floor, while a library containing films and film history is located on the fifth floor; a 100-square-metre (1,100 sq ft) storage area is found in the basement. Most of its visitors are academics or university students, although the centre also loans out some of its collections. Films can be viewed on-site in the 150-seat screening room or 500-seat theatre.

As of March 2012 Sinematek has roughly 2,700 films in its archives, mostly Indonesian, but also some foreign documentaries. This includes 84 negatives for black-and-white films and 548 negatives for colour films. The centre also contains over 15,000 reference works, many of which are difficult to find elsewhere; these works include newspaper clippings, screenplays, books, and government regulations. Other holdings include film posters and equipment.

== History ==
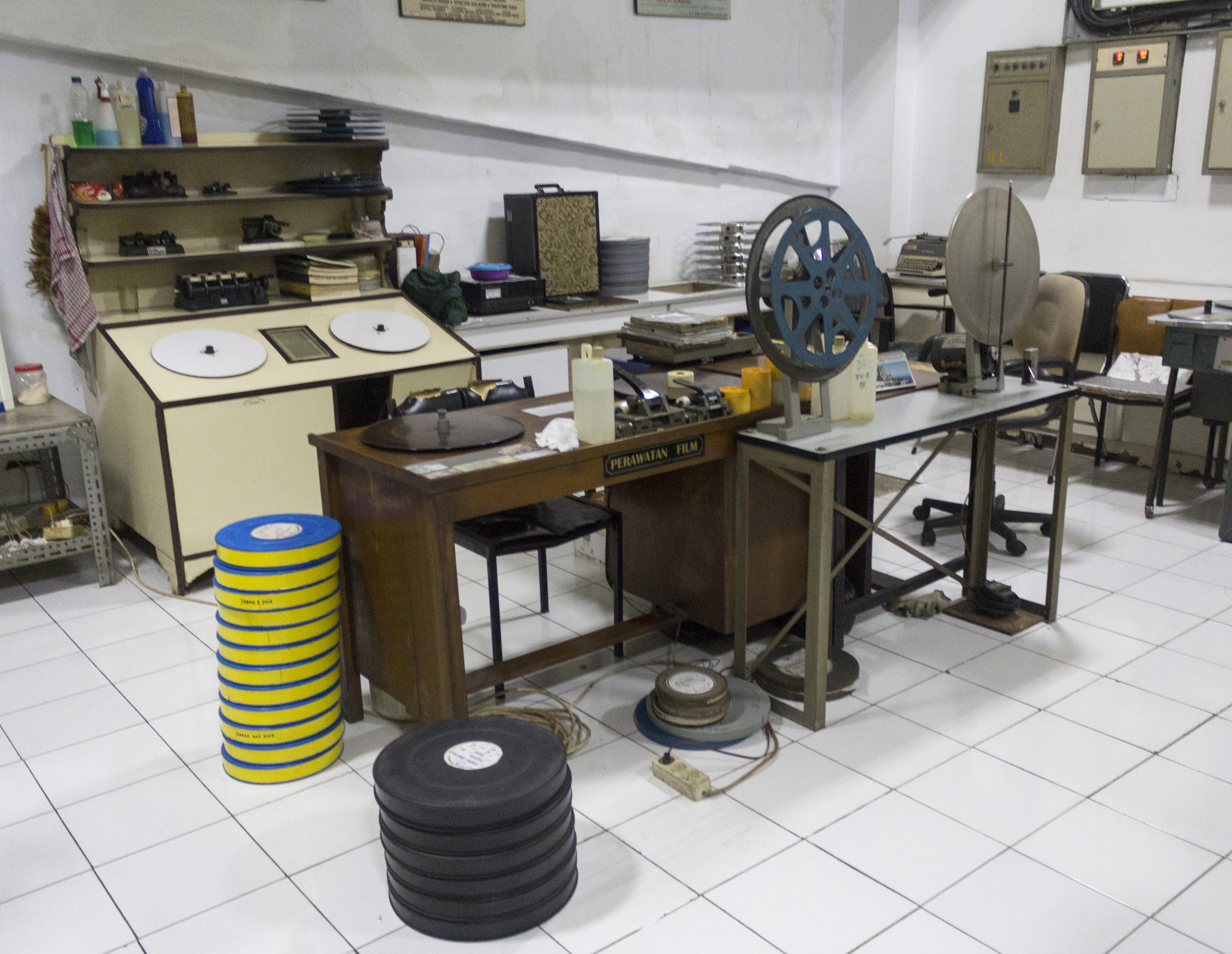
The film maintenance room at Sinematek Indonesia

The archive was founded by Misbach Yusa Biran, a film director turned documentarian, and Asrul Sani, a screenwriter, on 20 October 1975; Biran had previously established a documentation centre at the Jakarta Art Institute in late 1970 after noting that many Indonesian films had disappeared, and documentation of the country's cinema was lacking. He based Sinematek on archives he had seen in the Netherlands, while the name was drawn from the Cinémathèque Française in Paris.

The project received the blessings of Jakarta Governor Ali Sadikin, who also helped the centre receive funding from the Ministry of Information. It was the first film archive in Southeast Asia, and continues to be the only such archive in Indonesia. Its collection came in part from donations, and in part from purchases – either directly from producers or second-hand from mobile theatre owners. It joined the International Federation of Film Archives (Fédération Internationale des Archives du Film, or FIAF) in 1977.

Sinematek became part of the Usmar Ismail Foundation in 1995. In 2001 the central Indonesian government prohibited all non-profit organisations, including the archives, from receiving government funds; foreign funds also stopped coming in. This led to Sinematek becoming underfunded and its FIAF membership endangered. The archive received only Rp 17 million (US$2,000) monthly from the Film Center Foundation and the National Film Management. Work at the centre slowed to the point that Biran described it as having fallen into a coma.

As of 2012, Sinematek continues to be underfunded; of the estimated Rp 320 million (US$35,000) necessary to run the archive efficiently, it only receives Rp 48 million. Its 17 workers paid under Rp 1 million a month (roughly US$120). As a result, necessary maintenance work is not being done. The basement storage room has improper lighting, and has been covered in mould in several places. It does, however, have proper temperature and humidity control. Although the Indonesian government has allocated funds to construct a new building, the archive's workers believe that it will be fruitless unless funding is also provided for maintenance work.

Although restoration efforts on works such as Usmar Ismail's 1954 film Lewat Djam Malam (After the Curfew) were successful – before the restoration the film had noise and discolourations – funding and work were entirely from foreign institutions; the center has also had Ismail's 1958 film Tiga Dara (Three Maidens) restored in the Netherlands. In commemoration of Lewat Djam Malam's theatrical rerelease in June 2012, Sinematek started the Friends of Sinematek (Sahabat Sinematek) programme to promote the documentation and restoration of Indonesian works.
