= Misbach Yusa Biran =

Indonesian film director

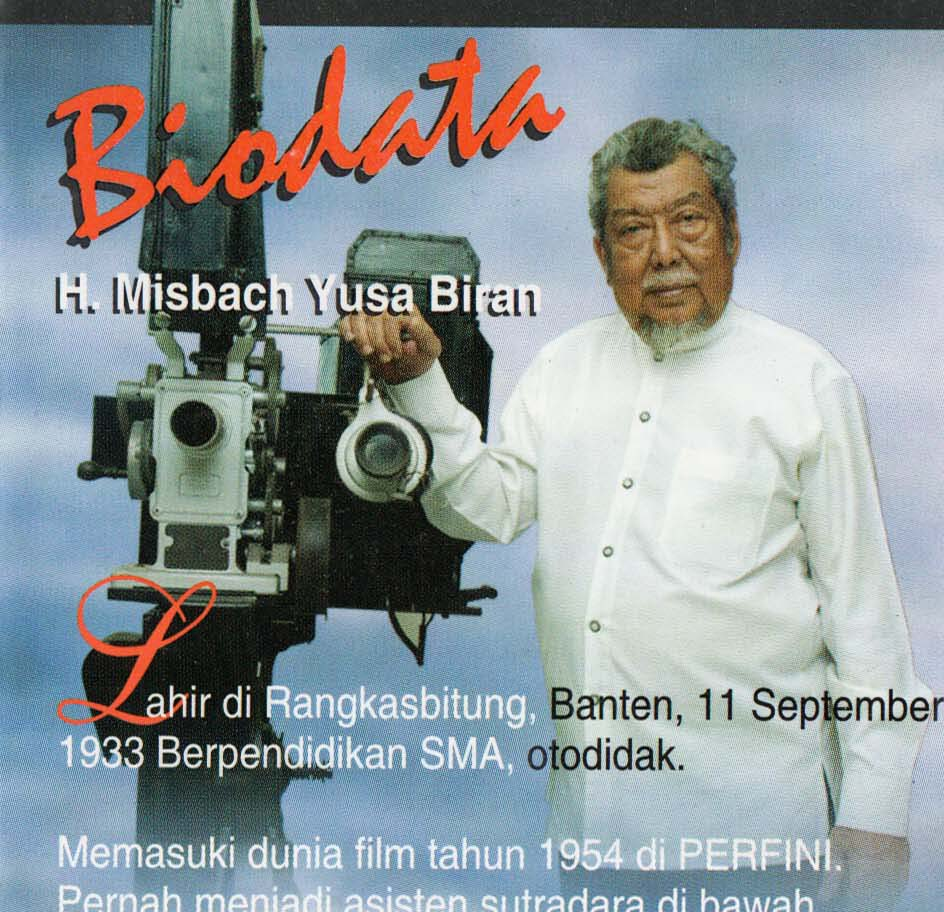
- Biran in 2009
- Born: 11 September 1933; Rangkasbitung, Dutch East Indies
- Died: 11 April 2012 (aged 78); South Tangerang, Indonesia
- Occupations: Writer; director; columnist
- Spouse: Nani Widjaja (m. 1969)
- Relatives: Ida Farida (sister)

Misbach Yusa Biran (11 September 1933 – 11 April 2012) was an Indonesian writer, director and columnist who pioneered the Indonesian film archives.

== Personal life ==
Biran was born in Rangkasbitung, in the Lebak Regency, to a Minangkabau father and a Bantenese mother. In 1969, he married actress Nani Widjaja. They had six children, two of whom (Cahya Kamila and Sukma Ayu) also went into the film industry.

== Career ==
=== Early life ===
Biran graduated from Taman Madya Bagian B, in Jakarta. He first began directing plays in the early 1950s, whilst at school, whilst he additionally wrote film reviews and produced literature works. However, after his graduation, he chose a career in film.

=== Film ===
From 1954 to 1956, Biran worked for the Indonesian National Film Company (PERFINI) under Usmar Ismail. He began as a script recorder, and later became Assistant Director and member of the Writers' Board. He rose to the position of Director of National Film Centre H. Usmar Ismail Jakarta, member of the National Film Council, and Chairman of the Film and Television Employees from 1987 to 1991.

In 1955, Biran wrote his first screenplay from a short story by Sjumandjaja, titled Kerontjong Kemajoran, which was later turned into a film titled Saodah by Persari Film.

From 1957 to 1960, he directed short films and documentaries. In 1967, Biran won the Citra Award for Best Director for his film Dibalik Tjahaja Gemerlapan. He also received an award for Best Script for his film Menjusuri Djedjak Berdarah, and for Ayahku (1987), directed by Agus Elias.

Biran ceased directing films in 1971, as a way to show his distaste for the film industry which was, at the time, flourishing with pornographic films.

What is considered his most important contribution to the national film industry was in establishing Sinematek Indonesia in 1975. It was an institution that independently archived the national films. Biran led Sinematek Indonesia until 2001, and became synonymous with the institution.

=== Writing ===
Peran Pemuda dalam Kebangkitan Film Indonesia (2009)

Biran was an active journalist: he was the Chief Editor of Minggu Abadi (1958–1959), Purnama (1962–1963), and later as an Editor of Duta Masjarakat (1965–1966), Abad Muslimin (1966), and Gelanggang (1967). His literary works included Bung Besar (drama, 1958), which was awarded second prize in a screenwriting competition by the Ministry of Education and Culture in 1958; Setengah Djam Mendjelang Maut (Drama, 1968); Menjusuri Djedjak Berdarah (novel, 1969); Keajaiban di Pasar Senen (anthology of short stories, 1971); and Oh, Film (anthology of short stories, 1973). The latter two story collections were bound and reprinted under the title Keajaiban di Pasar Senen in 1996.

Biran launched a book on Teknik Menulis Skenario Film Cerita on 30 January 2007.

== Death ==
Biran died on 11 April 2012 at the Eka Hospital, Serpong, Tangerang, Banten after a prolonged struggle with lung cancer. He was 78.

== Awards ==
Biran received an award from Forum Film Bandung for his dedication and contribution in the film industry.

He continued to write screenplays, and believed that film is a means to teach and raise the quality of human lives, particularly the lives of Indonesians.

In 2010, he received fellowships from the Southeast Asia-Pacific Audiovisual Archive Association (SEAPAVAA) in Bangkok, Thailand.

== Films ==
=== Directing ===
- Pesta Musik La Bana (1960)
- Holiday in Bali (1962)
- Bintang Ketjil (1963)
- Panggilan Nabi Ibrahim (1964)
- Apa Jang Kautangisi (1965)
- Dibalik Tjahaja Gemerlapan (1966)
- Menjusuri Djedjak Berdarah (1967)
- Operasi X (1968)
- Honey Money and Djakarta Fair (1970)

=== Screenplay writing ===
- Menyusuri Jejak Berdarah (1967)
- Ayahku (1987)
- Fatahillah (1997)

== Books ==
- Sejarah Film 1900–1950

Awards and achievements
Preceded by Bachtiar Siagian; Film : Turang (1960)	Best Director (Festival Film Indonesia); Film : Dibalik Tjahaja Gemerlapan (1967)	Succeeded by Wim Umboh; Film : Perkawinan (1973)
