= Njai Dasima =

Njai Dasima (Perfected Spelling: Nyai Dasima) (njai meaning "companion or mistress") denotes the title character of G. Francis' 1896 novel Tjerita Njai Dasima. It may also refer to the following films:

- Njai Dasima (1929 film), an adaptation of the novel directed by Lie Tek Swie
- Njai Dasima (1932 film), an adaptation of the novel directed by Bachtiar Effendi
- Dasima, a 1940 adaption directed by Tan Tjoei Hock
