= Siti Noerbaja =

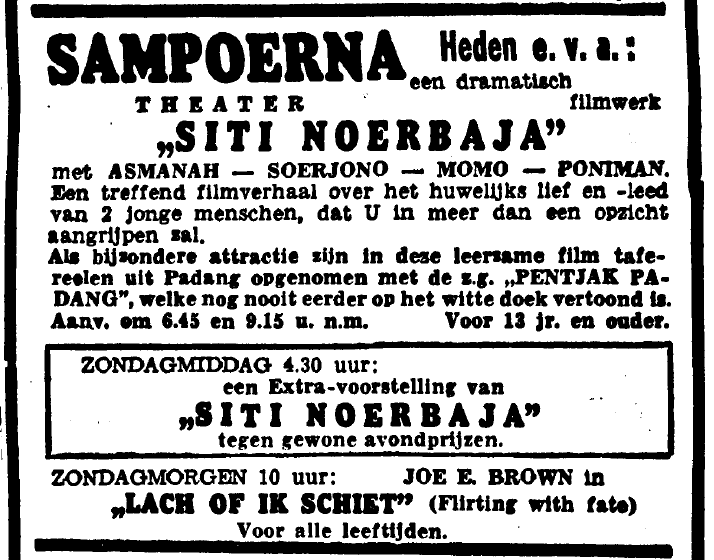
- Newspaper ad, Surabaya
- Directed by: Lie Tek Swie
- Based on: Sitti Nurbaya by Marah Roesli
- Produced by: Tan Khoen Yauw
- Starring: Asmanah; Momo; Soerjono
- Production company: Standard Film
- Release date: 1941 (Dutch East Indies)
- Country: Dutch East Indies
- Language: Indonesian

Siti Noerbaja (Perfected Spelling: Siti Nurbaya) is a 1941 film from the Dutch East Indies. Directed by Lie Tek Swie, it was the first film adaptation of Marah Roesli's 1922 novel of the same name. Starring Asmanah, Momo, and Soerjono, it follows two star-crossed teenage lovers.

== Plot ==
In Padang, childhood friends Samsoelbahri and Siti Noerbaja fall in love and kiss on the veranda, but are soon parted by their parents. Samsoelbahri goes to Batavia (Jakarta) to study, while Noerbaja must marry the contemptuous Datuk Meringgih so that he will forgive her father's debts.

Writing to Samsoelbahri, Noerbaja tells him that they can never be together as she has married. However, when she realises Merringih's violent nature she runs away to Batavia to join Samsoelbahri. They fall in love again, but must part after Noerbaja hears of her father's death. She hurries back to Padang, where Meringgih's men kill her with poisoned food. Receiving news of her death by letter, Samsu seemingly commits suicide.

Ten years later, Meringgih leads an uprising against the Dutch colonial government to protest a recent tax increase. During the uprising, Samsoelbahri (now a soldier for the Dutch) meets Meringgih and kills him, but is mortally wounded himself. After he dies he is buried next to Noerbaja.

== Production ==
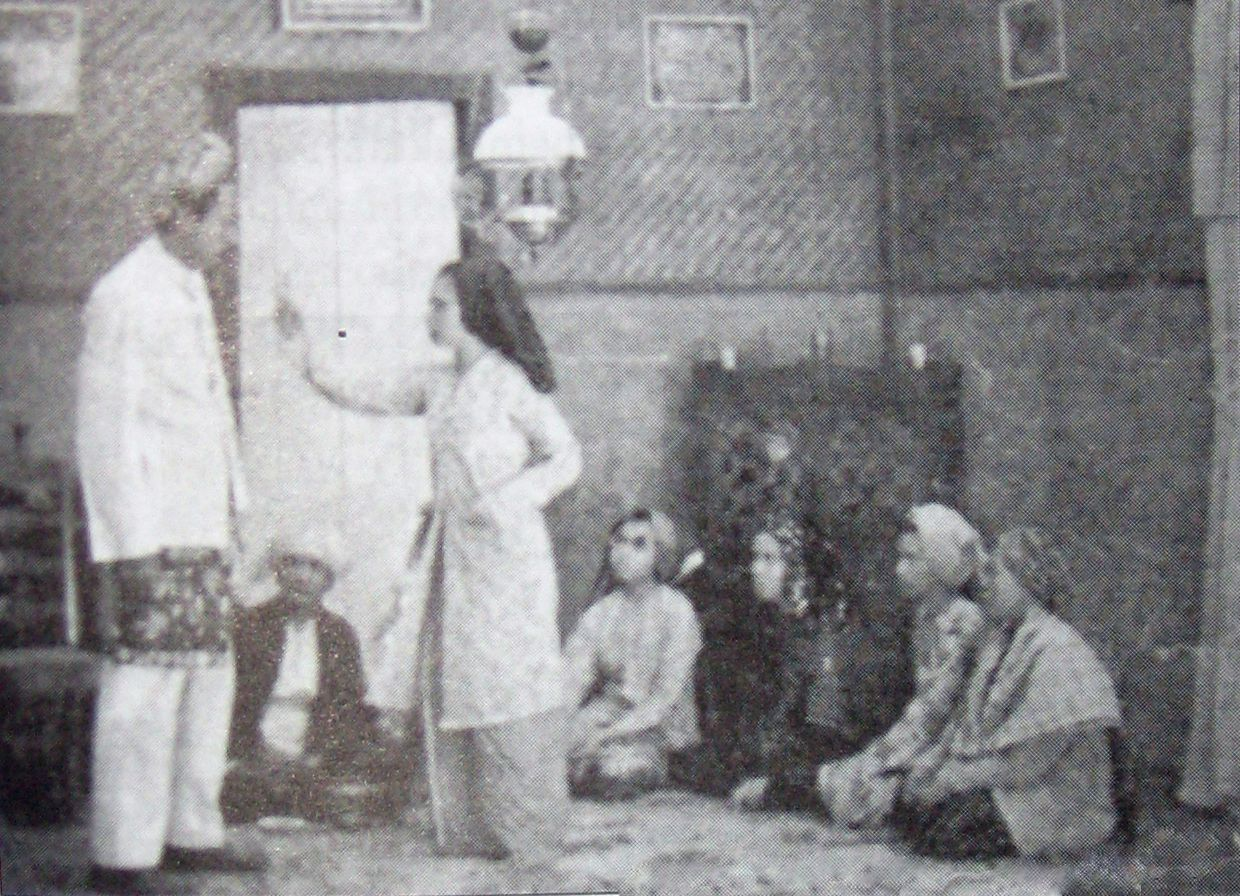
A film still from Siti Noerbaja

Siti Noerbaja was directed by Lie Tek Swie and produced Touw Ting Iem of Standard Film. It starred Asmanah, Momo, Soerjono, A Thys, and HA Rasjid. The black-and-white film was shot in 1941 and advertised as containing Padang-style pencak.

Siti Noerbaja was the first adaptation of Marah Roesli's 1922 novel Sitti Nurbaya. The book, which Indonesian critic Zuber Usman writes was inspired by the writer's heartbreak after his family rejected him taking a non-Minangkabau wife, was one of Balai Pustaka's most popular works, and had previously been adapted for the stage. Lie Tek Swie had previously directed two film adaptations, Njai Dasima in 1929 and Melati van Agam in 1931.

== Release and legacy ==
Siti Noerbaja was released in late 1941, and by 23 January 1942 it had reached Surabaya. The film was Lie's last with Standard Film. He left the company soon after, with Henry L. Duarte finishing the studio's final film, Selendang Delima.

The story has been filmed twice further, as a sinetron (soap opera). The first, in 1991, was directed by Dedi Setiadi, and starred Novia Kolopaking, Gusti Randa, and HIM Damsyik. The second version, beginning in December 2004, was directed by Encep Masduki and starred Nia Ramadhani, Ser Yozha Reza, and Anwar Fuady; this series introduced a new character as a competitor for Samsoelbahri's affections.

The film is likely lost. The American visual anthropologist Karl G. Heider writes that all Indonesian films from before 1950 are lost. However, JB Kristanto's Katalog Film Indonesia (Indonesian Film Catalogue) records several as having survived at Sinematek Indonesia's archives, and Biran writes that several Japanese propaganda films have survived at the Netherlands Government Information Service.

== Works cited ==
- Biran, Misbach Yusa (2009). Sejarah Film 1900–1950: Bikin Film di Jawa [History of Film 1900–1950: Making Films in Java] (in Indonesian). Jakarta: Komunitas Bamboo working with the Jakarta Art Council. ISBN 978-979-3731-58-2.
- Cohen, Matthew Isaac (August 2003). Trussler, Simon; Barker, Clive (eds.). "Look at the Clouds: Migration and West Sumatran 'Popular' Theatre" (PDF). New Theatre Quarterly. 19 (3). Cambridge: Cambridge University Press: 214–229. doi:10.1017/s0266464x03000125. ISSN 0266-464X. Archived (PDF) from the original on 23 October 2014.
- Eneste, Pamusuk (2001). Bibliografi Sastra Indonesia [Bibliography of Indonesian Literature] (in Indonesian). Magelang, Indonesia: Yayasan Indonesiatera. ISBN 978-979-9375-17-9.
- Foulcher, Keith (2002). "Dissolving into the Elsewhere: Mimicry and ambivalence in Marah Roesli's 'Sitti Noerbaja'". In Foulcher, Keith; Day, Tony (eds.). Clearing a Space: Postcolonial Readings of Modern Indonesian Literature. Leiden: KITLV Press. pp. 85–108. ISBN 978-90-6718-189-1. OCLC 51857766.
- Heider, Karl G (1991). Indonesian Cinema: National Culture on Screen. Honolulu: University of Hawaii Press. ISBN 978-0-8248-1367-3.
- Said, Salim (1982). Profil Dunia Film Indonesia [Profile of Indonesian Cinema] (in Indonesian). Jakarta: Grafiti Pers. OCLC 9507803.
- "Siti Noerbaja". filmindonesia.or.id (in Indonesian). Jakarta: Konfiden Foundation. Archived from the original on 2 December 2013.
- "Sitti Nurbaya Versi Baru akan di Tayangkan di Trans TV" [The New Version of Sitti Nurbaya will be Broadcast on Trans TV]. KapanLagi.com (in Indonesian). 2004.
- "(untitled)". Soerabaijasch Handelsblad (in Dutch). Kolff & Co. 23 January 1942. p. 7.
