= List of film directors of the Dutch East Indies =

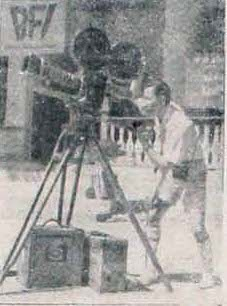
The Wong brothers (one pictured) were the first ethnic Chinese directors in the Indies.

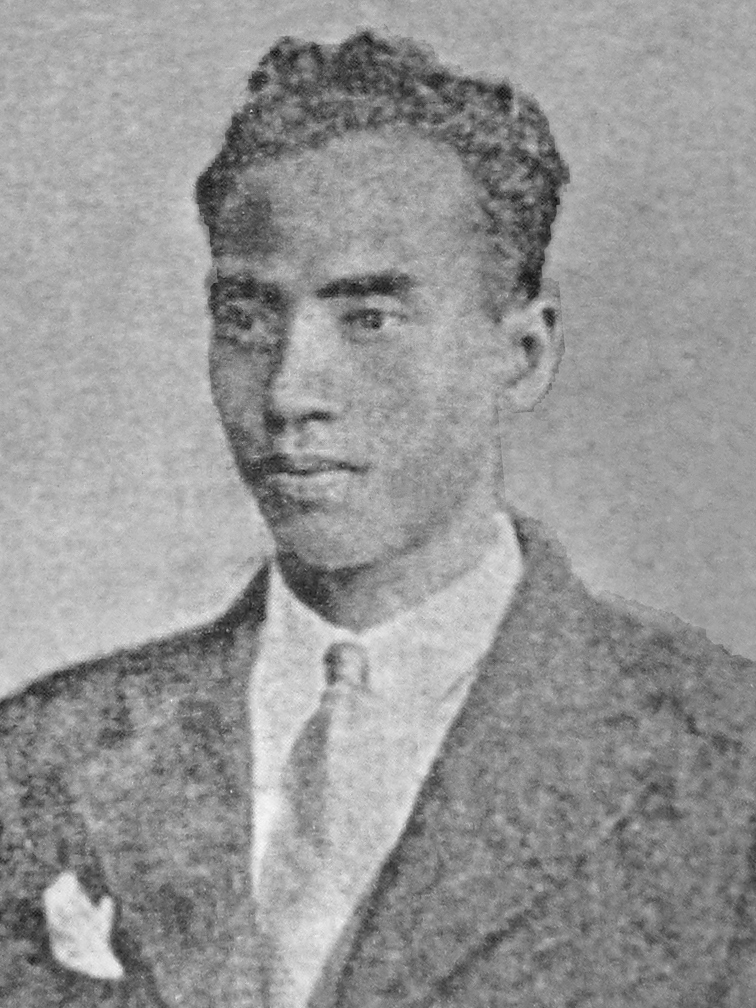
Bachtiar Effendi, the earliest recorded native Indonesian director

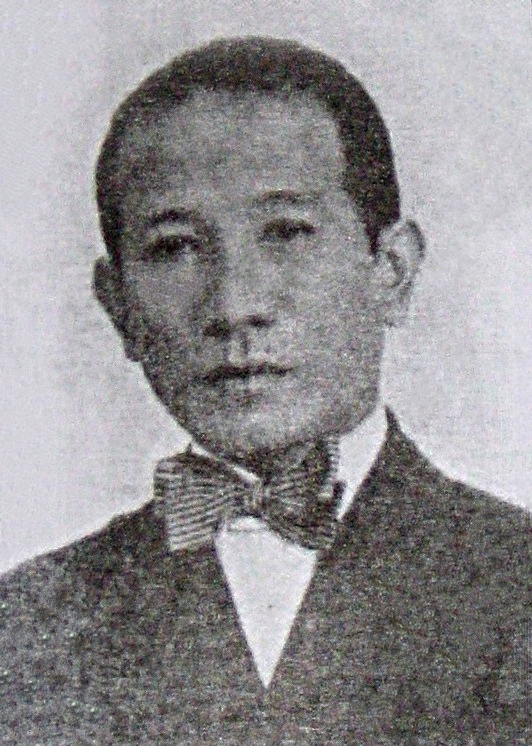
Andjar Asmara, a journalist, became a director in 1940.

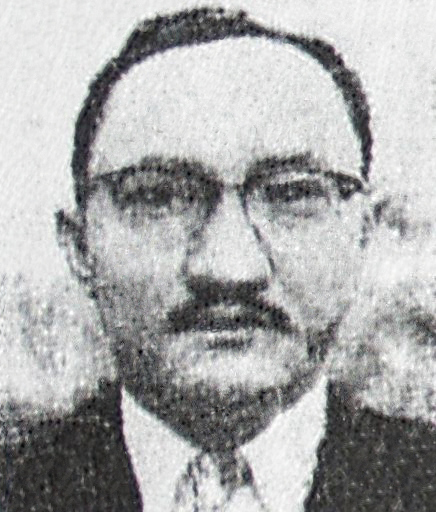
Usmar Ismail, who made his debut in 1949, would later be called the father of Indonesian film.

Twenty-nine people are recorded as having directed fictional films in the Dutch East Indies between 1926, when L. Heuveldorp released Loetoeng Kasaroeng, the colony's first domestically produced film, and 1949, when the Dutch formally recognised Indonesia's sovereignty after a four-year revolution, leaving the Dutch East Indies defunct. (Note: The Dutch had occupied the Indies for more than 300 years. Following a three-year Japanese occupation during World War II, Indonesia proclaimed its independence in 1945, an action which was not well-received by the Dutch (Kahin 1952, pp. 29, 101, 136) .) Thirteen directors active in the Indies continued to direct films after 1950, including Usmar Ismail: his 1955 film Darah dan Doa (The Long March) is generally considered the first truly Indonesian film.

The colony's first directors, L. Heuveldorp and George Krugers, were of European or mixed descent. They were followed by ethnic Chinese soon after, when Nelson Wong made his debut in 1928 with Lily van Java; other Chinese directors included Lie Tek Swie (1929), Wong's brothers Joshua and Othniel (1930), and The Teng Chun (1931). Ethnic Chinese directors dominated the colony's cinema for the remainder of its existence. The first native director, Bachtiar Effendi, made his debut in 1932 with the talkie Njai Dasima; another native director would not appear until Andjar Asmara and Rd Ariffien made their debuts in 1940.

The directors active in the Indies came from various backgrounds. Some, like The Teng Chun, Fred Young, and the Wongs, had been interested in film since their youth. Others, such as Njoo Cheong Seng and Andjar, had a background in theatre. Still others, including Albert Balink and Ismail, were journalists by trade. They were all men; the first woman to direct a film in the Indonesian archipelago, Ratna Asmara, made her debut after the Indies were dissolved. Between them, the 29 men directed some 103 films, at times working collaboratively; it was not unusual for them to take more than one role in production. However, they generally had less creative control than the producer.

The following list is sorted alphabetically by default, with further sorting capability in certain fields; owing to differing naming conventions between cultures, not all entries are sorted by last name. The list only counts fictional films directed by the subjects and does not include films from other genres or films in which the person held other roles. The names of persons credited with an abbreviated name are written in full, where available.

== Film directors ==
Key
†	Indicates continued directorial activity after 1949

Film directors of the Dutch East Indies
Name	Fictional film debut	Debut year	Films directed before 1949	Total films directed	Ref(s).
Andjar Asmara	Kartinah	1940	5	5	
Raden Ariffien †	Harta Berdarah	1940	4	32	(Note: Often credited as Rd. Ariffien)
Albert Balink	Pareh	1935	2	2	
Boen Kim Nam	Mega Mendoeng	1941	1	1	
Ph. Carli	De Stem des Bloeds	1930	3	3	
Henry L. Duarte †	Selendang Delima	1941	1	12	(Note: Also credited as Hendro Sudarto)
Bachtiar Effendi †	Njai Dasima	1932	1	4	
Mannus Franken	Pareh	1935	2	2	(Note: Franken was better known for his short documentaries and spent most of his career in his homeland, the Netherlands.)
L. Heuveldorp	Loetoeng Kasaroeng	1926	1	1	
R. Hu †	Harta Berdarah	1940	2	4	
Usmar Ismail †	Harta Karun	1949	2	28	(Note: Also credited as PL Kapoor)
Jo An Djan †	Kedok Ketawa	1940	5	6	
Jo Eng Sek	Pah Wongso Pendekar Boediman	1940	3	3	
B. Koesoema	Djatoeh Berkait	1944	1	1	(Note: A pseudonym of Bunjin Kurata, a member of the Japanese occupation forces.)
George Krugers	Eulis Atjih	1927	3	3	
Lie Tek Swie	Njai Dasima	1929	6	6	
Njoo Cheong Seng †	Kris Mataram	1940	5	8	
Inoe Perbatasari †	Elang Darat	1941	3	5	
Roestam Sutan Palindih	Di Menara	1943	3	3	(Note: Often credited as Roestam St. Palindih; his oeuvre may include a short entitled Djatoeh Berkait, which is formally credited to B. Koesoema (Filmindonesia.or.id, Djatoeh Berkait).)
Mohammad Said Hamid Junid †	Boenga Sembodja	1942	3	19	(Note: Often credited as Moh. Said HJ)
M. H. Schilling	Sinjo Tjo Main di Film	1931	2	2	
Sutan Usman Karim	Panggilan Darah	1941	2	2	(Note: Credited as Suska)
Tan Tjoei Hock	Dasima	1940	9	9	(Note: Also credited as TH Tan and Tanu Trh)
The Teng Chun †	Boenga Roos dari Tjikembang	1931	16	17	
Joshua Wong †	Lari ke Arab	1930	10	12	(Note: Figures for Nelson Wong include three films directed with his brothers, Joshua and Othniel, for which they are credited as the Wong brothers. Figures for Joshua and Othniel also include a further three collaborations made after Nelson's death, two directed before 1949 and one directed afterwards.)
Nelson Wong	Lily van Java	1928	6	6	
Othniel Wong †	Lari ke Arab	1930	10	13	
Wu Tsun	Lintah Darat	1941	4	4	
Fred Young †	Sehidup Semati	1949	2	23	(Note: Also credited as Utomo)

== Works cited ==
- "Abisin Abbas | Filmografi" [Abisin Abbas | Filmography]. filmindonesia.or.id (in Indonesian). Jakarta: Konfiden Foundation. Archived from the original on 16 April 2014.
- "Albert Balink | Filmografi" [Albert Balink | Filmography]. filmindonesia.or.id (in Indonesian). Jakarta: Konfiden Foundation. Archived from the original on 16 April 2014.
- "Bachtiar Effendy | Filmografi" [Bachtiar Effendy | Filmography]. filmindonesia.or.id (in Indonesian). Jakarta: Konfiden Foundation. Archived from the original on 16 April 2014.
- Biran, Misbach Yusa (2009). Sejarah Film 1900–1950: Bikin Film di Jawa [History of Film 1900–1950: Making Films in Java] (in Indonesian). Jakarta: Komunitas Bamboo working with the Jakarta Art Council. ISBN 978-979-3731-58-2.
- "Boen Kim Nam | Filmografi" [Boen Kim Nam | Filmography]. filmindonesia.or.id (in Indonesian). Jakarta: Konfiden Foundation. Archived from the original on 16 April 2014.
- "Djatoeh Berkait". filmindonesia.or.id (in Indonesian). Jakarta: Konfiden Foundation. Archived from the original on 2 December 2013.
- "Fred Young | Filmografi" [Fred Young | Filmography]. filmindonesia.or.id (in Indonesian). Jakarta: Konfiden Foundation. Archived from the original on 20 February 2015.
- "Inoe Perbatasari | Filmografi" [Inoe Perbatasari | Filmography]. filmindonesia.or.id (in Indonesian). Jakarta: Konfiden Foundation. Archived from the original on 16 April 2014.
- "G. Krugers | Filmografi" [G. Krugers | Filmography]. filmindonesia.or.id (in Indonesian). Jakarta: Konfiden Foundation. Archived from the original on 16 April 2014.
- "Henry L Duarte | Filmografi" [Henry L Duarte | Filmography]. filmindonesia.or.id (in Indonesian). Jakarta: Konfiden Foundation. Archived from the original on 16 April 2014.
- I.N., Soebagijo (1981). Jagat Wartawan Indonesia [Universe of Indonesian Journalists] (in Indonesian). Jakarta: Gunung Agung. OCLC 7654542.
- "Indische filmkunst" [Indies Cinema]. De Indische Courant (in Dutch). Surabaya. 11 June 1931. p. 5.
- "Jo An Djan | Filmografi" [Jo An Djan | Filmography]. filmindonesia.or.id (in Indonesian). Jakarta: Konfiden Foundation. Archived from the original on 16 April 2014.
- "Jo An Tjiang | Filmografi" [Jo An Tjiang | Filmography]. filmindonesia.or.id (in Indonesian). Jakarta: Konfiden Foundation. Archived from the original on 16 April 2014.
- "Joshua Wong | Filmografi" [Joshua Wong | Filmography]. filmindonesia.or.id (in Indonesian). Jakarta: Konfiden Foundation. Archived from the original on 19 February 2014.
- Kahin, George McTurnan (1952). Nationalism and Revolution in Indonesia. Ithaca, New York: Cornell University Press. ISBN 978-0-8014-9108-5.
- Kurniasari, Triwik (24 June 2012). "Reviving Usmar Ismail's legacy". The Jakarta Post. Archived from the original on 16 April 2014.
- "L. Heuveldorp | Filmografi" [L. Heuveldorp | Filmography]. filmindonesia.or.id (in Indonesian). Jakarta: Konfiden Foundation. Archived from the original on 16 April 2014.
- "Lie Tek Swie | Filmografi" [Lie Tek Swie | Filmography]. filmindonesia.or.id (in Indonesian). Jakarta: Konfiden Foundation. Archived from the original on 15 December 2013.
- "Lily van Java". Encyclopedia of Jakarta (in Indonesian). Jakarta: Jakarta City Government.
- "Mannus Franken". filmmuseum.nl. Amsterdam: EYE Film Institute Netherlands. 20 October 2011.
- "MH Schilling | Filmografi" [MH Schilling | Filmography]. filmindonesia.or.id (in Indonesian). Jakarta: Konfiden Foundation. Archived from the original on 16 April 2014.
- "Mohammad Said Hamid Junid | Filmografi" [Mohammad Said Hamid Junid | Filmography]. filmindonesia.or.id (in Indonesian). Jakarta: Konfiden Foundation. Archived from the original on 16 April 2014.
- "Nelson Wong | Filmografi" [Nelson Wong | Filmography]. filmindonesia.or.id (in Indonesian). Jakarta: Konfiden Foundation. Archived from the original on 19 February 2014.
- "Njoo Cheong Seng | Filmografi" [Njoo Cheong Seng | Filmography]. filmindonesia.or.id (in Indonesian). Jakarta: National Library of Indonesia with Sinematek. Archived from the original on 20 February 2015.
- "Othniel Wong | Filmografi" [Othniel Wong | Filmography]. filmindonesia.or.id (in Indonesian). Jakarta: Konfiden Foundation. Archived from the original on 19 February 2014.
- "R Hu | Filmografi" [R Hu | Filmography]. filmindonesia.or.id (in Indonesian). Jakarta: Konfiden Foundation. Archived from the original on 16 April 2014.
- "Rd Ariffien | Filmografi" [Rd Ariffien | Filmography]. filmindonesia.or.id (in Indonesian). Jakarta: Konfiden Foundation. Archived from the original on 17 April 2014.
- "Roestam St Palindih | Filmografi" [Roestam St Palindih | Filmography]. filmindonesia.or.id (in Indonesian). Jakarta: Konfiden Foundation. Archived from the original on 16 April 2014.
- "Rustam St Palindih | Filmografi" [Rustam St Palindih | Filmography]. filmindonesia.or.id (in Indonesian). Jakarta: Konfiden Foundation. Archived from the original on 27 February 2014.
- Said, Salim (1982). Profil Dunia Film Indonesia [Profile of Indonesian Cinema] (in Indonesian). Jakarta: Grafiti Pers. OCLC 9507803.
- "Suska | Filmografi" [Suska | Filmography]. filmindonesia.or.id (in Indonesian). Jakarta: Konfiden Foundation. Archived from the original on 16 April 2014.
- Swestin, Grace (July 2009). "In the Boys' Club: A Historical Perspective on the Roles of Women in the Indonesian Cinema 1926 – May 1998". Scriptura. 3 (2). Surabaya: Petra Christian University: 103–111. Archived from the original on 16 April 2014.
- "Tan Tjoei Hock | Filmografi" [Tan Tjoei Hock | Filmography]. filmindonesia.or.id (in Indonesian). Jakarta: Konfiden Foundation. Archived from the original on 29 October 2013.
- "The Teng Chun | Filmografi" [The Teng Chun | Filmography]. filmindonesia.or.id (in Indonesian). Jakarta: Konfiden Foundation. Archived from the original on 16 April 2014.
- "Usmar Ismail | Filmografi" [Usmar Ismail | Filmography]. filmindonesia.or.id (in Indonesian). Jakarta: Konfiden Foundation. Archived from the original on 16 April 2014.
- "Wong Bersaudara | Filmografi" [Wong Brothers | Filmography]. filmindonesia.or.id (in Indonesian). Jakarta: Konfiden Foundation. Archived from the original on 16 April 2014.
- "Wu Tsun | Filmografi" [Wu Tsun | Filmography]. filmindonesia.or.id (in Indonesian). Jakarta: Konfiden Foundation. Archived from the original on 16 April 2014.
