= Si Ronda =

1930 film

- Directed by: Lie Tek Swie
- Produced by: Tan Khoen Yauw
- Starring: Bachtiar Effendi; Momo
- Cinematography: A Loepias
- Production company: Tan's Film
- Release date: 1930 (Dutch East Indies)
- Country: Dutch East Indies

Si Ronda is a 1930 silent film from the Dutch East Indies which was directed by Lie Tek Swie and starred Bachtiar Effendi. Based on contemporary Betawi oral tradition, it follows the exploits of a bandit, skilled in silat (traditional Malay martial arts), known as Si Ronda. In the lenong stories from which the film was derived, Ronda was often depicted as a Robin Hood type of figure. The production, now thought lost, was one of a series of martial arts films released between 1929 and 1931. Si Ronda received little coverage in the media upon its release. A second adaptation of the tale, Si Ronda Macan Betawi, was made in 1978.

== Production ==
Si Ronda was adapted from a lenong (a Betawi oral tradition similar to a stage play) popular with ethnic Chinese and native audiences of the time. The Ronda stories follow the Betawi bandit of the same name, who is skilled at silat (traditional martial arts) and reputed to take from the rich to give to the poor. The Indonesian film scholar Misbach Yusa Biran suggests that Ronda was selected for adaptation because of its potential action sequences. In the domestic cinema, such sequences had generally been inspired by American works and been well received by audiences.

Similar stories to Si Ronda's include those of Si Jampang and Si Pitung; these stage plays centred on extraordinary men (referred to as jago) who, though living outside the law, generally fought for the common populace. Adaptations of the genre, manifested as bandit films, became popular in domestic cinema following the release of Si Tjonat by Batavia Motion Picture in 1929. This release was followed by the Wong brothers' Rampok Preanger (also 1929), and an adaptation of the Si Pitung stories in 1931. Not all films in this genre, which consisted of a quarter of all domestic releases for 1929–1931, maintained the heroic qualities of the central character: the Wongs' adaptation of Si Pitung, for instance, portrayed him as a simple bandit and not the Robin Hood figure of stage.

Si Ronda was directed by Lie Tek Swie and produced by Tan Khoen Yauw of Tan's Film. The two had previously worked together on the company's highly profitable Njai Dasima in 1929. Cinematography was handled by A. Loepias. Shot in black-and-white, this silent film starred Bachtiar Effendi, a set decorator with Tan's, in his on-screen debut playing the title role. It also featured Momo, an actor who had appeared in the film Njai Dasima.

== Release and legacy ==
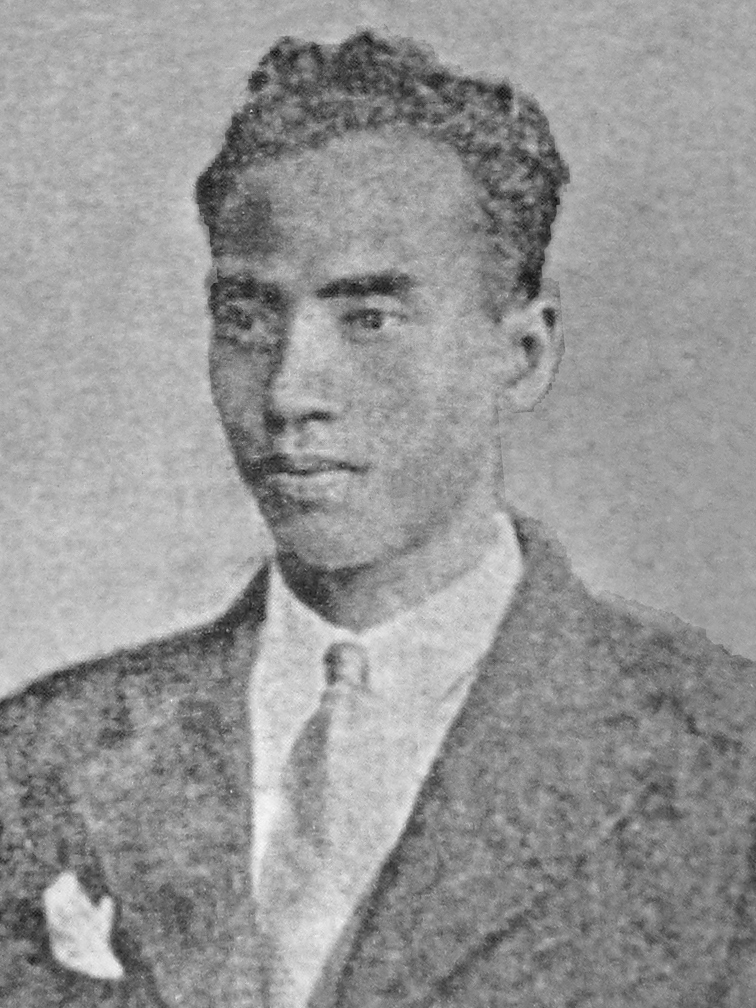
Bachtiar Effendi, who played the title role in Si Ronda

Si Ronda was released in 1930; Effendi stated that it was released before Tan's Nancy Bikin Pembalesan (Nancy Takes Revenge), a sequel to Njai Dasima, began screening in May 1930. Dutch newspapers indicate that it had screened in Medan, North Sumatra, by 1932. Biran writes that the film received little coverage; he notes that Sinematek Indonesia has no news clippings related to Si Ronda.

After Si Ronda, Lie and Tan collaborated on three further films. Lie left Tan's in 1932, reportedly as his approach no longer matched Tan's low-class target audience and caused the works to go over budget. Effendi continued to work with Tan's until 1932, when he left to head the cinema magazine Doenia Film. Momo continued acting until 1941, first with Tan's and later with Standard Film. The film is likely lost. The American visual anthropologist Karl G. Heider writes that all Indonesian films from before 1950 are lost. However, JB Kristanto's Katalog Film Indonesia (Indonesian Film Catalogue) records several as having survived at Sinematek Indonesia's archives.

Another film based on the Ronda stories, titled Si Ronda Macan Betawi (Ronda the Betawi Tiger), was released in 1978. Directed by Fritz G. Schadt, it starred Dicky Zulkarnaen in the title role and Lenny Marlina as his lover. In this adaptation Ronda uses his silat skills to fight corrupt land owners and colonial government workers.

== Works cited ==
- Biran, Misbach Yusa (2009). Sejarah Film 1900–1950: Bikin Film di Jawa [History of Film 1900–1950: Making Films in Java] (in Indonesian). Jakarta: Komunitas Bamboo working with the Jakarta Art Council. ISBN 978-979-3731-58-2.
- Gouda, Frances (1999). "Gender and 'Hyper-masculinity' as Post-colonial Modernity during Indonesia's Struggle for Independence, 1945 to 1949". In Burton, Antoinette (ed.). Gender, Sexuality and Colonial Modernities. London: Routledge. pp. 163–76. ISBN 978-0-203-98449-9.
- Heider, Karl G. (1991). Indonesian Cinema: National Culture on Screen. Honolulu: University of Hawaii Press. ISBN 978-0-8248-1367-3.
- "Kredit Si Ronda" [Credits for Si Ronda]. filmindonesia.or.id (in Indonesian). Jakarta: Konfiden Foundation. Archived from the original on 15 December 2013.
- "Kunst en Vermakelijkheden" [Art and Entertainment]. De Sumatra Post (in Dutch). Medan: J. Hallermann. 7 January 1932. p. 5.
- "Momo". filmindonesia.or.id (in Indonesian). Jakarta: Konfiden Foundation. Archived from the original on 6 March 2016.
- "Ronda, Si". Encyclopedia of Jakarta (in Indonesian). Jakarta City Government. Archived from the original on 7 January 2013.
- Said, Salim (1982). Profil Dunia Film Indonesia [Profile of Indonesian Cinema] (in Indonesian). Jakarta: Grafiti Pers. OCLC 9507803.
- Sen, Krishna (1995). Indonesian Cinema: Framing the New Order. London: Zed Books. ISBN 978-1-85649-123-5.
- "Si Ronda". filmindonesia.or.id (in Indonesian). Jakarta: Konfiden Foundation. Archived from the original on 2 December 2013.
- "Si Ronda Macan Betawi". filmindonesia.or.id (in Indonesian). Jakarta: Konfiden Foundation. Archived from the original on 15 December 2013.
- van Till, Margreet (1996). "In Search of Si Pitung: The History of an Indonesian Legend". Bijdragen tot de Taal-, Land- en Volkenkunde. 152 (3): 461–482. doi:10.1163/22134379-90003007. ISSN 0006-2294. JSTOR 27864777. OCLC 770588866. (subscription required)
