= Lie Tek Swie =

Indonesian film director

- Born: Indonesia
- Occupation: Film director

Lie Tek Swie (Chinese: 李德水; pinyin: Lǐ Déshuǐ; Pe̍h-ōe-jī: Lí Tek-súi; fl. 1929–1940) was an Indonesian film director active in the early cinema of the Dutch East Indies. He is thought to have begun his career at a film distributor's office before making his directorial debut in 1929 with Njai Dasima, the first of three literary adaptations that he directed. His other three films, two of which were made for Tan's Film, were original stories. In 1941 Lie was a founding member of the Standard Film Company, which closed in 1942.

== Early career ==
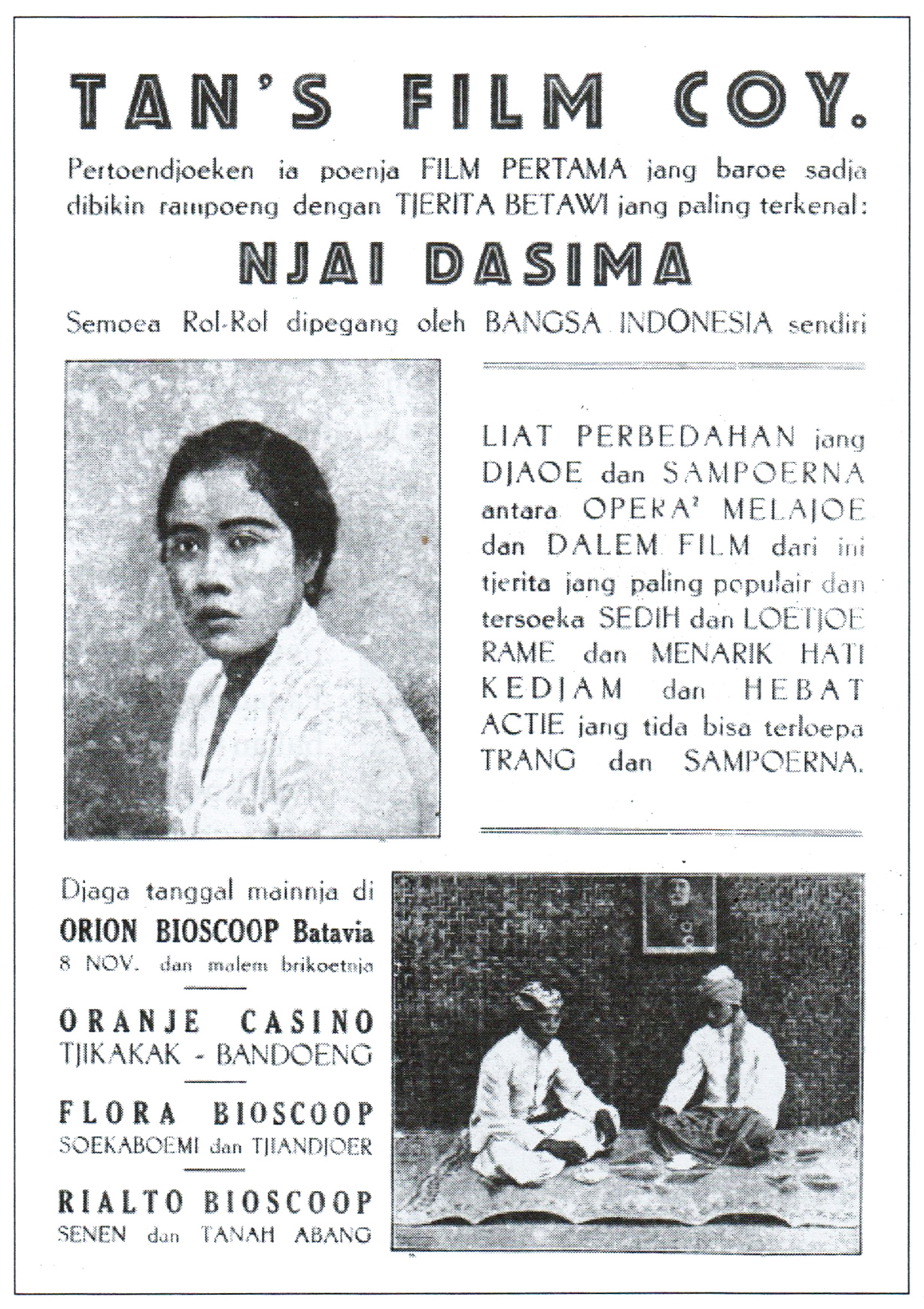
Film poster for Njai Dasima, Lie's directorial debut

According to Bachtiar Effendi, an actor and later film director who had worked with Lie several times, Lie had worked at a film distributor's office before joining Tan's, handling the distribution and sometimes editing of Hollywood imports. The Indonesian film historian Misbach Yusa Biran credits this as giving Lie a wider worldview and more modern sensibilities while directing. In 1929 Lie directed his first film, Njai Dasima, for Tan's Film. The two-part film, which followed a woman who was tricked into leaving her wealthy lover by a delman driver, was a critical success; it was Lie's first adaptation of a literary work, having been derived from the novel Tjerita Njai Dasima (Story of Njai Dasima), written by G. Francis in 1896.

This was followed by a sequel, Nancy Bikin Pembalesan (Nancy Takes Revenge) in 1930, which followed Dasima's adult daughter Nancy in a quest to avenge her mother's death; this work was also a success. According to Biran, around this time Lie developed an interest in ethnography and began inserting documentation of cultural habits. Later that year Lie directed Si Ronda for Tan's, an action film which told of a bandit named Ronda. Lie directed another novel adaptation, the two-part Melati van Agam (Jasmine of Agam), in 1931; the original work had been written by Parada Harahap under the pen name "Swan Pen" in 1923.

== Post-Tan's ==
No information is available on Lie's activities between 1932 and 1941. He left Tan's in 1932, reportedly as his approach no longer matched Tan's low-class target audience and caused the works to go over-budget; the company itself was closed between 1932 and 1938. Lie resurfaced in 1941 when he joined with the Tan Brothers – the owners of Tan's Film – to establish Standard Film Company, under the management of the British-trained Touw Teng Iem.

Lie directed two of the company's three productions. These two films were Ikan Doejoeng (Mermaid) and Siti Noerbaja. Ikan Doejoeng was an original production which followed a girl who becomes a mermaid after having to choose between a man she loves and a man she is forced to marry, while Siti Noerbaja was an adaptation of Marah Rusli's 1923 novel of the same name which follows a young woman – who is killed by her greedy husband – and her ex-lover – who avenges her death. The last one, Selendang Delima (The Pomegranate Shawl; 1941), was directed by the former dramatist Henry L. Duarte before Standard closed in 1942 following the Japanese invasion.

== Filmography ==
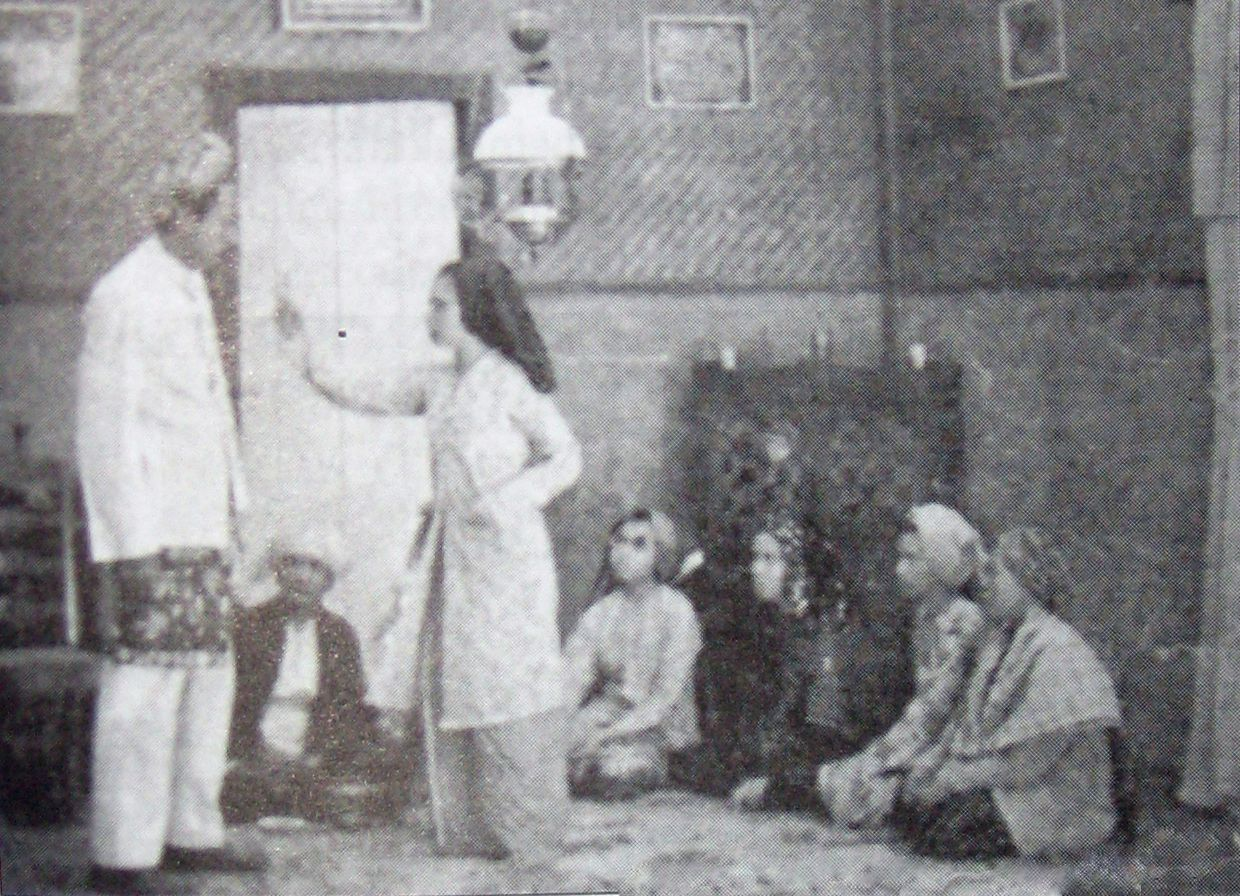
A film still from Lie's 1941 film Siti Noerbaja, one of several literary adaptations he directed

All as director

Year	Film
1929	Njai Dasima (In two parts, second half in released 1930)
1930	Nancy Bikin Pembalesan (Nancy Takes Revenge)
1930	Si Ronda
1931	Melati van Agam (Jasmine of Agam; in two parts)
1941	Ikan Doejoeng (Mermaid)
1941	Siti Noerbaja
