= Tjerita Njai Dasima =

Indonesian novel

Tjěrita Njai Dasima: Soewatoe Korban dari pada Pěmboedjoek (The Story of Njai Dasima: A Victim of Temptation), sometimes spelled Cerita Nyai Dasima, is an Indonesian short novel written by G. Francis. It was published in 1896 by Kho Tjeng Bie & Co. of Batavia and written in colloquial Malay. The story is about Dasima, a Sundanese woman, who becomes nyai, or concubine, to an Englishman. It was based on a true story, and the novel was adapted for theatre, music, and film.

The novel is considered to be the first of a genre of stories based on things said to have "actually occurred", popular among "early Chinese-Malay novels".

== Author ==
Little is known about G. Francis, as it was likely a pen-name. He was likely of English descent, and based on the language used in the novel, could have been part-Indonesian, Christian, and so considered legally European by the standards of the time.

Francis was on the editorial staff of Bandung-area newspaper Pengadilan, before moving to Batavia, and publishing a biography of Napoleon in 1891.

== Summary ==
The story takes place in 1813. Dasima is a Muslim girl from the village of Kuripan, near Bogor, who is employed in the house of a Christian Englishman. Dasima is given gifts from him, and together they have a daughter, Nancy. When they move to Batavia, Dasima is subject to the envy of many, and her wealth attracts the attention of Samiun, a well-connected Muslim who lives with his mother and wife, Hayati.

Samiun pays Mah Buyung, a local widow, to help him win Dasima's affection. Mah Buyung becomes a servant in Dasima's house, and encourages Dasima to leave her European employer as well as using magic to serve this purpose. Dasima eventually leaves her employer and daughter behind to become Samiun's second wife, and when she comes to be mistreated by him and his mother, demands divorce and to be returned the property granted him by the marriage. Samiun pays Puasa, a local gangster, to kill Dasima and he body is cast into the Ciliwung river, where it lands by the property of her former employer. He leaves Indonesia, taking Nancy with him.

== Background ==
The nyai often referred to a native woman kept by a European colonist and was a widespread practice until the mid 1880s, when the Suez Canal opened and more families were moved from Europe to the Indies. The nyai's role was in the domestic realm, as overseer of property, housekeeping, as well as sexual relations for single and married men alike. Newspapers covered sordid stories and a genre of popular fiction, "nyai tales", arose from the public's fascination. Nyai were a curiosity to readers, as well as for the scandalous element that developed as traditional Dutch families were made mainstream.

Dasima's role in the story has been reinterpreted to suit the needs of the author, but the mainstays of her character are "as noble, faithful, long-suffering, and passive-and as a victim."

== Reception ==
The original audience were "the first generation of the new "urban bourgeoisie," who from the latter half of the nineteenth-century experienced a change in the form of their literary enjoyment from stories that were read aloud (the world of the storyteller) to stories that were read in silence." Tjerita Njai Dasima and similar stories represented a discontent with colonial society.

The novel had a strong anti-Muslim sentiment which was removed in subsequent adaptions, specifically in the 1929 film in order to appeal to local (non-Chinese, non-European) audiences.

As the popularity of nyai stories waned, Tjerita Njai Dasima has "outlived disappearance of the genre".

== Adaptions ==
Since it was published, Tjerita Njai Dasima was rewritten and adapted to various media. A verse form was published by O. S. Tjiang, a Chinese Malay poet, in 1897. A Dutch version was published by Manusama, an author popular for his work on kroncong. In 1965, a version was written in Betawi language, by S. M. Ardan, an Indonesian film critic (the 1970 film was also in Betawi).

Different adaptions of the story of Njai Dasima "mark substantial change in the presentation of the colonial relationship", markedly between the colonial period and after independence. The main point of conflict in the older publications came from religious differences, but in later versions the focus shifted away from religion and towards race, or the national Indonesian identity.

=== Films ===
- Njai Dasima (1929 film)
- Njai Dasima (1932 film)
- Dasima, 1940
- Samiun and Dasima, 1970
