= Ikan Doejoeng =

1941 Dutch East Indies film

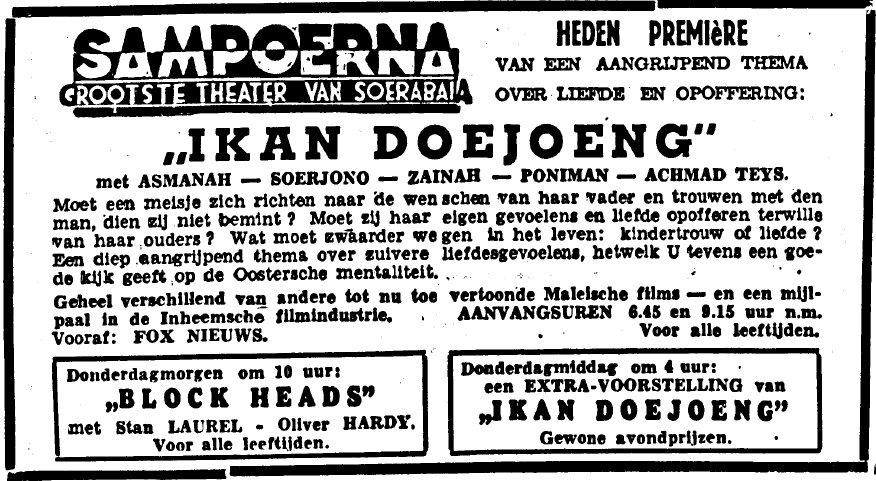
- Newspaper ad, Surabaya
- Directed by: Lie Tek Swie
- Starring: Asmanah; Soerjono
- Production company: Standard Film
- Release date: 1941 (Dutch East Indies)
- Country: Dutch East Indies
- Language: Indonesian

Ikan Doejoeng (Perfected Spelling: Ikan Duyung, literally meaning Mermaid) is a 1941 film from the Dutch East Indies directed by Lie Tek Swie and starring Asmanah and Soerjono. Following star-crossed lovers, the film was the first released by Standard Film. Likely targeted at the educated elite, it is now probably lost.

== Plot ==
Asmara is in love with Sanusi, but told to marry Harun. Unknown to her, Harun is already in a romantic relationship with Emi. As a means of escape, Asmara imagines herself to be a mermaid. Meanwhile, Sanusi must face bandits.

== Production ==
Ikan Doejoeng was directed by Lie Tek Swie and produced by Touw Ting Iem (or James), an English-trained sound technician. It was the first production of Standard Film, which Lie had established together with the Tan brothers (Khoen Yauw and Khoen Hian) earlier that year; in the early 1930s he had directed several films for them, most recently Melati van Agam (Jasmine of Agam) in 1932. Touw, however, was titularly head of the Batavia-based company. Ikan Doejoeng was shot in black-and-white. Much of the filming was conducted on or under water.

The film starred Asmanah and Soerjono. It also featured Achmad Thys, Poniman, Momo, Nawi Ismail, and A. Rasjid.

== Release and reception ==
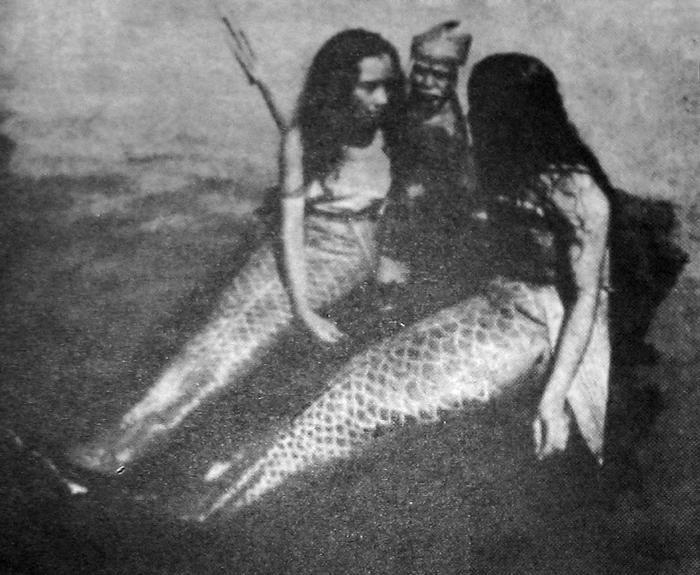
A still from Ikan Doejoeng

Ikan Doejoeng was released in late 1941. By September of that year it had been screened in Medan, and by December it had reached Surabaya. It was rated "for all audiences" ("voor all leeftijden"). The Indonesian film historian Misbach Yusa Biran suggests that the film was likely targeted at the growing native intellectual class, citing the plot. He writes, however, that the Ikan Doejoeng's technical quality was on par with films aimed at uneducated audiences. The film was advertised as having a "deeply poignant theme of pure love", which would give viewers "a good perspective on the Eastern mentality." (Note: Original: "Een diep aangrijpend thema over zuivere liefdesgevoelens, hetwelk U tevens een goede kijk geeft op de Oostersche mentaliteit.")

Lie would go on to direct one last film for Standard, Siti Noerbaja, in 1942; he ultimately left the company. Standard closed later that year, having released three films: the last, Selendang Delima (Pomegranate Shawl), was directed by Henry L. Duarte.

The film is likely lost. The American visual anthropologist Karl G. Heider writes that all Indonesian films from before 1950 are lost. However, JB Kristanto's Katalog Film Indonesia (Indonesian Film Catalogue) records several as having survived at Sinematek Indonesia's archives, and Biran writes that several Japanese propaganda films have survived at the Netherlands Government Information Service.

== Works cited ==
- Biran, Misbach Yusa (2009). Sejarah Film 1900–1950: Bikin Film di Jawa [History of Film 1900–1950: Making Films in Java] (in Indonesian). Jakarta: Komunitas Bamboo working with the Jakarta Art Council. ISBN 978-979-3731-58-2.
- Heider, Karl G (1991). Indonesian Cinema: National Culture on Screen. Honolulu: University of Hawaii Press. ISBN 978-0-8248-1367-3.
- "Ikan Doejoeng". filmindonesia.or.id (in Indonesian). Jakarta: Konfiden Foundation. Archived from the original on 2 December 2013.
- "(untitled)". De Sumatra Post (in Dutch). Medan: J. Hallermann. 27 September 1941. p. 8. Archived from the original on 13 April 2013.
- "(untitled)". Soerabaijasch Handelsblad (in Dutch). Surabaya: Kolff & Co. 31 December 1941. p. 8. Archived from the original on 13 April 2013.
