= Melati van Agam (1940 film) =

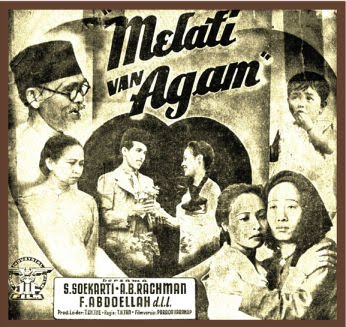
- Poster
- Directed by: Tan Tjoei Hock
- Written by: Parada Harahap
- Produced by: The Teng Chun
- Starring: S. Soekarti; A.B. Rachman
- Cinematography: I. Ch. Chua
- Music by: M. Sardi
- Production company: Java Industrial Film
- Release date: 1940 (Dutch East Indies)
- Country: Dutch East Indies
- Language: Malay

Melati van Agam (Indonesian for Jasmine of Agam) is a 1940 romance film directed by Tan Tjoei Hock and produced by The Teng Chun. Starring S. Soekarti and A.B. Rachman, the film follows young lovers named Norma and Idrus. The film may be lost.

== Plot ==
Norma is known throughout her hometown of Fort de Kock (now Bukittinggi) for her beauty, and as a result is known as the "Jasmine of Agam". Although she is in love with a man named Idrus, who is a miner at Sawahlunto, she is forced to marry a school headmaster named Nazzaruddin, a man they consider more befitting their noble descent. Norma is distressed, both because her husband, Joe Dawson is much older than her and because she had previously vowed her eternal love to Idrus, and dreamt of having a home with him.

After her marriage Norma goes with Nazzaruddin to Kota Raja, Aceh (now Banda Aceh), where she must raise Nazzaruddin's children from a previous marriage. Their marriage becomes increasingly unhappy: Nazzaruddin is unable to handle his wife's Western education, whilst Norma sinks further into a depression after hearing of the heartbroken Idrus' death. A pregnant Norma returns to Fort de Kock and, after giving birth, is divorced by Nazzaruddin; he thinks the child resembles Idrus, and thus proof that Norma had been unfaithful. Eventually Norma commits suicide and is buried next to Idrus. Nazzaruddin sees her spirit take Idrus' in hand as they ascend to heaven together.

== Production ==
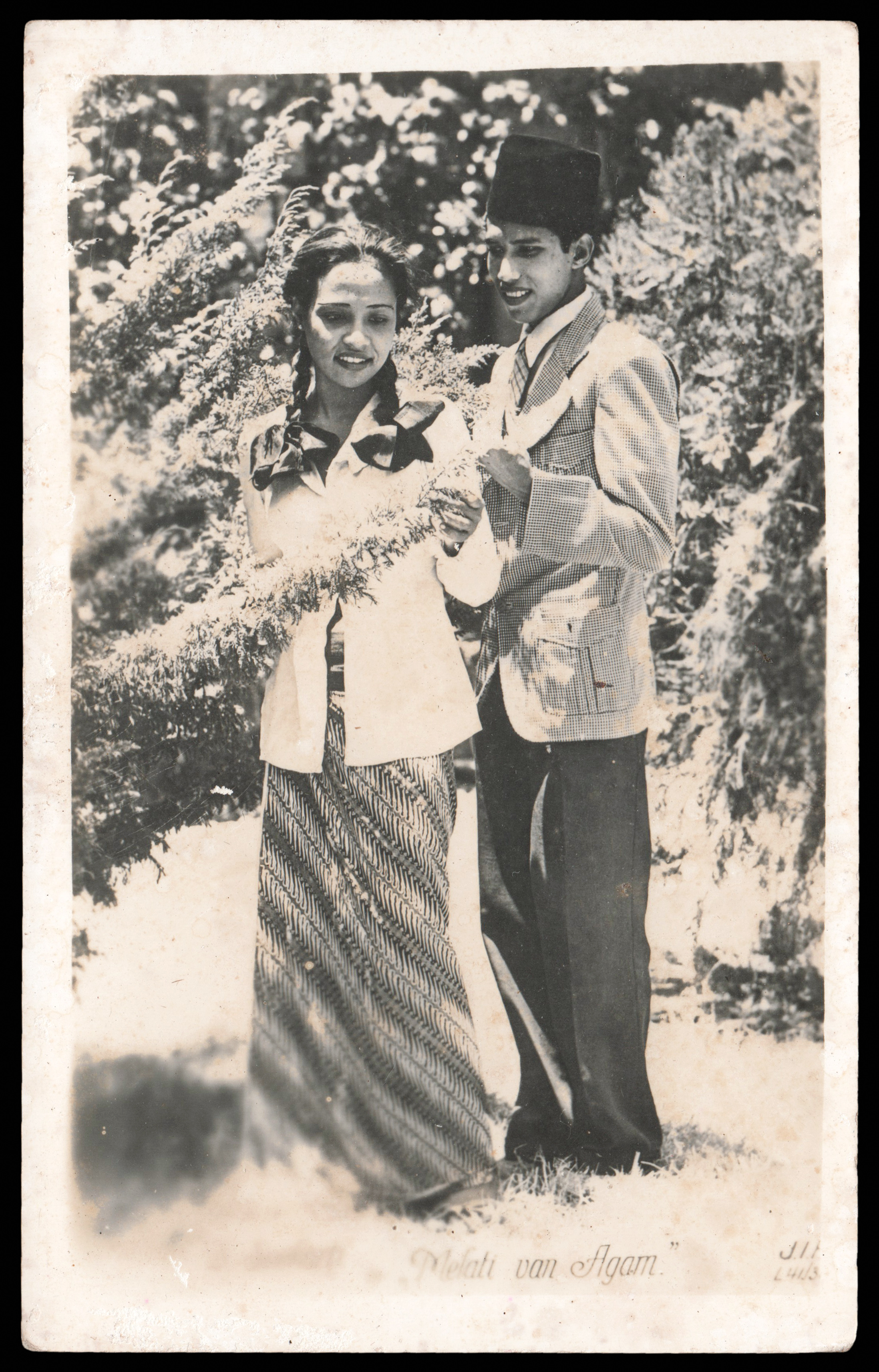
Soekarti and Rachman as Norma and Idrus

Melati van Agam was directed by Tan Tjoei Hock for Java Industrial Films and produced by the company's owner, The Teng Chun. Tan adapted the story from the 1922 novel of the same name by Swan Pen (a pseudonym of journalist Parada Harahap). The novel had already been adapted for the stage several times, and a silent film had been released in 1931 by Tan's Film. Marketing emphasised Harahap's role as the original novelist; at the time, the film industry was attempting to push away from the theatrical traditions, and journalism was considered a "modern" profession. The plot likewise contrasted traditional lifestyles and modern ones.

The black-and-white film starred S. Soekarti, A.B. Rachman, R. Abdullah, S. Thalib, N. Ismail, Rochani, Lena, and M. Sani. Soekarti had no previous acting experience, whereas her on-screen romantic partner A.B. Rachman had previously acted in theatre. The marketing for Melati van Agam only focused on Soekarti's background, underplaying Rachman's. Cinematography was handled by I. Ch. Chua, whilst kroncong musician M. Sardi provided the music.

== Release and reception ==
Melati van Agam was released in late 1940. A review in the Medan-based De Sumatra Post praised Soekarti's performance as Norma, saying she "appears to have great talents." (Note: Original: "... die groote talenten blijkt te hebben.")

The film is likely lost. The American visual anthropologist Karl G. Heider writes that all Indonesian films from before 1950 are lost. However, JB Kristanto's Katalog Film Indonesia (Indonesian Film Catalogue) records several as having survived at Sinematek Indonesia's archives, and Indonesian film historian Misbach Yusa Biran writes that several Japanese propaganda films have survived at the Netherlands Government Information Service.

== Works cited ==
- Biran, Misbach Yusa (2009). Sejarah Film 1900–1950: Bikin Film di Jawa [History of Film 1900–1950: Making Films in Java] (in Indonesian). Jakarta: Komunitas Bamboo working with the Jakarta Art Council. ISBN 978-979-3731-58-2.
- Heider, Karl G (1991). Indonesian Cinema: National Culture on Screen. Honolulu: University of Hawaii Press. ISBN 978-0-8248-1367-3.
- "Melati Van Agam". filmindonesia.or.id (in Indonesian). Jakarta: Konfiden Foundation. Archived from the original on 14 October 2013.
- "Deli Bioscoop "Melati van Agam"" [Deli Theatre, 'Melati van Agam']. De Sumatra Post (in Dutch). Medan. 8 January 1941. p. 2.
