= HIM Damsyik =

Indonesian dancer and actor

- Born: Incik Muhammad Damsyik; 14 March 1929; Teluk Betung, Lampung, Dutch East Indies
- Died: 3 February 2012 (aged 82); Depok, West Java, Indonesia
- Education: Rellum Dancing School
- Occupations: Dancer, film actor
- Known for: Sitti Nurbaya (TV series)
- Height: 1.8 m (5 ft 11 in)
- Spouse: Linda Damsyik
- Children: 5

Hajji Incik Muhammad Damsyik (14 March 1929 – 3 February 2012), better known as HIM Damsyik or Datuk Maringgih was an Indonesian dancer and actor.

== Biography ==
Damsyik was born in Teluk Betung, Lampung, Dutch East Indies on 14 March 1929. His father was the director of employees of the Koninklijke Paketvaart-Maatschappij, a shipping company. In the 1950s, he moved to Jakarta to further his education; at the same time he learning and competing in Ballroom Dance. After winning a competition, he spent four years studying at the Rellum Dancing School in the Netherlands.

Upon returning to Indonesia, Damsyik began giving private dance lessons. In 1959 he was approached by Wim Umboh to do the choreography for Bertamasaya (Picnic); Damsyik ended up acting in the film as well.

Damsyik became popular in 1992 after playing the antagonist Datuk Meringgih in Dedi Setiadi's serial adaptation of Marah Roesli's novel Sitti Nurbaya (1922). Although he first considered not taking the role, after the series' cancellation he continued to identify with it.

On 12 July 2002 Damsyik was selected as the head of the Indonesian Dance Association, under the National Sports Committee of Indonesia.

Towards the end of 2011, Damsyik fell ill and in and out of the hospital. A first diagnosis, at Puri Cinere Hospital, was for Dengue. Two weeks afterwards, he was admitted to the Metropolitan Medical Centre (MMC); two weeks after his release, he was back at MMC, where he began undergoing treatment for myelodysplastic syndrome. Damsyik died at Cinere Hospital in South Jakarta at roughly 2:00 a.m. local time (UTC+7) on 3 February 2012. He was buried at Karet Bivak the same day.

== Personal life ==
Damsyik was married to Linda Damsyik, a dance instructor. Together the couple had five children and ran several dance studios in Jakarta. Before his death, Damsyik was 1.8 m (5 ft 11 in) tall and weighed 55 kilograms (121 lb).
