= Huwen op Bevel =

1931 film directed by George Krugers

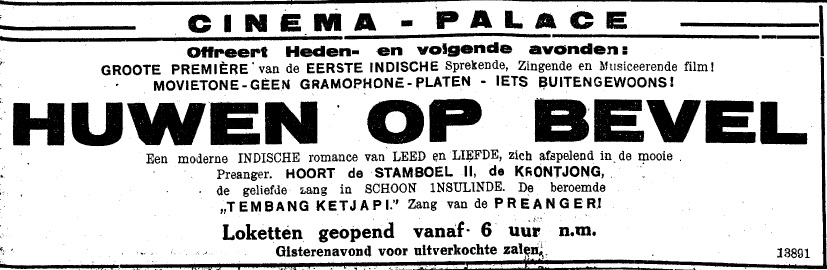
- Advertisement, Batavia
- Directed by: George Krugers
- Produced by: George Krugers; Tan Khoen Yauw
- Cinematography: Tembang Ketjapi
- Production company: Tan's Film
- Release date: August 1931 (Dutch East Indies)
- Country: Dutch East Indies
- Language: Malay

Huwen op Bevel (also known as Terpaksa Menikah, both meaning Forced to Marry) is a 1931 romance film from the Dutch East Indies (now Indonesia). Directed by George Krugers and thought to have been produced by Tan's Film, it follows two young lovers who are nearly separated but can ultimately be together. A critical flop, it was Krugers's last as a director. It is likely lost.

== Plot ==
A young Indonesian intellectual falls in love with a woman. Although she loves him, she is told to marry an older man, one who has gone on the hajj. Ultimately they are able to be together.

== Production ==
George Krugers, director of Huwen op Bevel

Huwen op Bevel was directed by George Krugers and produced by Krugers in collaboration with Tan Khoen Yauw of Tan's Film. The Indonesian film historian Misbach Yusa Biran suggests that Krugers, whose last film Karnadi Anemer Bangkong (1930) was produced by his own Krugers Filmbedrijf in Bandung, had run out of funds during production and thus began working for Tan; he credits this to Karnadi Anemer Bangkong's failure. Concurrently with his work on Huwen op Bevel, for which he also handled the cinematography, Krugers served as cameraman for Tan's talkie version of Njai Dasima, directed by Bachtiar Effendi.

The film's dialogue was in Malay. Songs were sung by the kroncong group Tembang Ketjapi.

== Release and reception ==
Huwen op Bevel was released in 1931, although several sources list it as being from 1932. It screened in Batavia (now Jakarta) in August, reaching Medan in late September and Surabaya by mid-October. The film was advertised as having full sound, including music and singing. Later advertisements compared it with Tan's production, Njai Dasima. It was advertised as the first sound film in the Indies and referred to as such by some later writings. Biran, however, writes that Krugers's earlier film Karnadi Anemer Bangkong featured sound.

Huwen op Bevel received negative reviews. One in the Batavia-based Het Nieuws van den dag voor Nederlandsch-Indië found the film to lack contrast and have poor vocal synchronisation; the reviewer summarised that "turning the crank is not enough; a filmmaker must master the technique". (Note: Original: "Het draaien aan een zwengel is bii het opnemen van films niet voldoende, men moet ook de film-techniek meester zijn") The film was a commercial failure and proved Krugers's last film as director.

Huwen op Bevel is likely a lost film. The American visual anthropologist Karl G. Heider writes that all Indonesian films made before 1950 are lost. However, JB Kristanto's Katalog Film Indonesia (Indonesian Film Catalogue) records several as having survived at Sinematek Indonesia's archives, and Biran writes that several Japanese propaganda films have survived at the Netherlands Government Information Service.

== Works cited ==
- "Bioscopen" [Theatres]. De Indische Courant (in Dutch). Surabaya. 17 October 1931. p. 2.
- Biran, Misbach Yusa (2009). Sejarah Film 1900–1950: Bikin Film di Jawa [History of Film 1900–1950: Making Films in Java] (in Indonesian). Komunitas Bamboo working with the Jakarta Art Council. ISBN 978-979-3731-58-2.
- "Film-critieken. "Huwen op Bevel."" [Film review "Huwen op Bevel."]. Het Nieuws van den dag voor Nederlandsch-Indië (in Dutch). Batavia: NV Mij tot Expl. van Dagbladen. 11 August 1931. p. 5. Archived from the original on 2 December 2013.
- "Filmnieuws. Inlandsche Films" [Film News: Inlander Films]. De Soematra Post (in Dutch). Medan: J. Hallermann. 3 October 1931. p. 5.
- Heider, Karl G (1991). Indonesian Cinema: National Culture on Screen. Honolulu: University of Hawaii Press. ISBN 978-0-8248-1367-3.
- "Kunst en Vermakelijkheden" [Art and Entertainment]. De Soematra Post (in Dutch). Medan: J. Hallermann. 30 September 1931. p. 7.
- "Terpaksa Menika". filmindonesia.or.id (in Indonesian). Jakarta: Konfidan Foundation. Archived from the original on 3 April 2014.
- "(untitled)". Het Nieuws van den dag voor Nederlandsch-Indië (in Dutch). Batavia: NV Mij tot Expl. van Dagbladen. 11 August 1931. p. 7.
- "(untitled)". Soerabaijasch Handelsblad (in Dutch). Surabaya: Kolff & Co. 17 October 1931. p. 11.
