= Melati van Agam (1931 film) =

1931 film

- Directed by: Lie Tek Swie
- Written by: Parada Harahap
- Produced by: Tan Khoen Yauw
- Starring: A Rachman; Neng Titi; Oemar; Bachtiar Effendi
- Cinematography: Wong brothers
- Production company: Tan's Film
- Release date: 1931 (Dutch East Indies)
- Country: Dutch East Indies
- Language: Silent

Melati van Agam (also written Melatie van Agam; literally Jasmine of Agam) is a 1931 romance film directed by Lie Tek Swie and produced by Tan's Film. Starring A. Rachman, Neng Titi, Oemar, and Bachtiar Effendi, the two-part film follows the young lovers Norma and Idrus. The film, which may be lost, was reportedly a commercial success, but critical reviews were less favourable.

== Plot ==
=== Part one ===
Norma is known throughout her hometown of Fort de Kock (now Bukittinggi) for her beauty, to the point that she is known as the "Jasmine of Agam". She is in love with a man named Idrus, who is a miner at Sawahlunto. Her parents – descended from nobility – disapprove of the relationship and betroth Norma to Nazzaruddin, a school headmaster who already has four children and is older than Norma's father. Norma is distressed, having previously vowed her eternal love to Idrus, and dreams of having a home with him.

=== Part two ===
After her marriage Norma is taken away to Kota Raja, Aceh (now Banda Aceh), where she must raise Nazzaruddin's children. Their marriage becomes increasingly unhappy, with Nazzaruddin unable to handle his wife's Western education and Norma sinking further into a depression after hearing of Idrus' death. Pregnant, Norma returns to Fort de Kock. After she delivers her child, Nazzaruddin divorces her; he thinks the child resembles Idrus. Eventually Norma commits suicide and is buried next to Idrus. Nazzaruddin sees her spirit take Idrus' in hand as they ascend to heaven together.

== Production ==
Melati van Agam was produced by the ethnic-Chinese owned Tan's Film. It was adapted from a Toneel Melajoe drama written by the reporter Parada Harahap which had proved popular; Tan's earlier work, Njai Dasima (1929), had also been an adaptation. However, unlike the earlier production Melati van Agam dealt with a then-relatively unknown culture; previous works had dealt with ethnic groups from Java. The Indonesian film historian Misbach Yusa Biran suggests that this may have been caused by the director Lie Tek Swie working with the Sumatran-born reporter Andjar Asmara. The film abandoned the love letters that had formed much of the source material, focusing instead on actions.

Melati van Agam starred A. Rachman, Neng Titi, Oemar, and Bachtiar Effendi. Oemar and Rachman had previously acted with the Padangsche Opera, with which Andjar had previously worked. Lie, the director, had previously completed Nancy Bikin Pembalesan (Nancy Takes Revenge; 1930) for Tan's and was known for his focus on showing attractive landscapes in his work. Cinematography was done by Loepias; the silent film was black and white. The film was completed by mid-1930, and by August of that year an early preview had been shown.

== Release ==
Melati van Agam was released in two parts, with the first premiering on 16 December 1931. Kwee Tek Hoay, writing for Panorama magazine, ridiculed the film's "illogical" plot and wrote that "even the stupidest villager could spot the flaws"; (Note: Original: ... orang desa yang bodoh pun bisa melihat cacat itu.) he considered Norma's actions more befitting a prostitute than an average woman. Andjar Asmara praised the work in Doenia Film, especially its acting. The film was a commercial success.

After Melati van Agam Lie left Tan's over creative differences. Tan's closed in 1932, after producing several more films, but was reformed in the late 1930s. The Teng Chun produced a remake of Melati van Agam, with the same title, in 1940.

The film is likely a lost film. The American visual anthropologist Karl G. Heider writes that all Indonesian films from before 1950 are lost. However, JB Kristanto's Katalog Film Indonesia (Indonesian Film Catalogue) records several as having survived at Sinematek Indonesia's archives, and Biran writes that several Japanese propaganda films have survived at the Netherlands Government Information Service.
