= Njai =

Dutch-Indonesian housekeepers, companions, and concubines

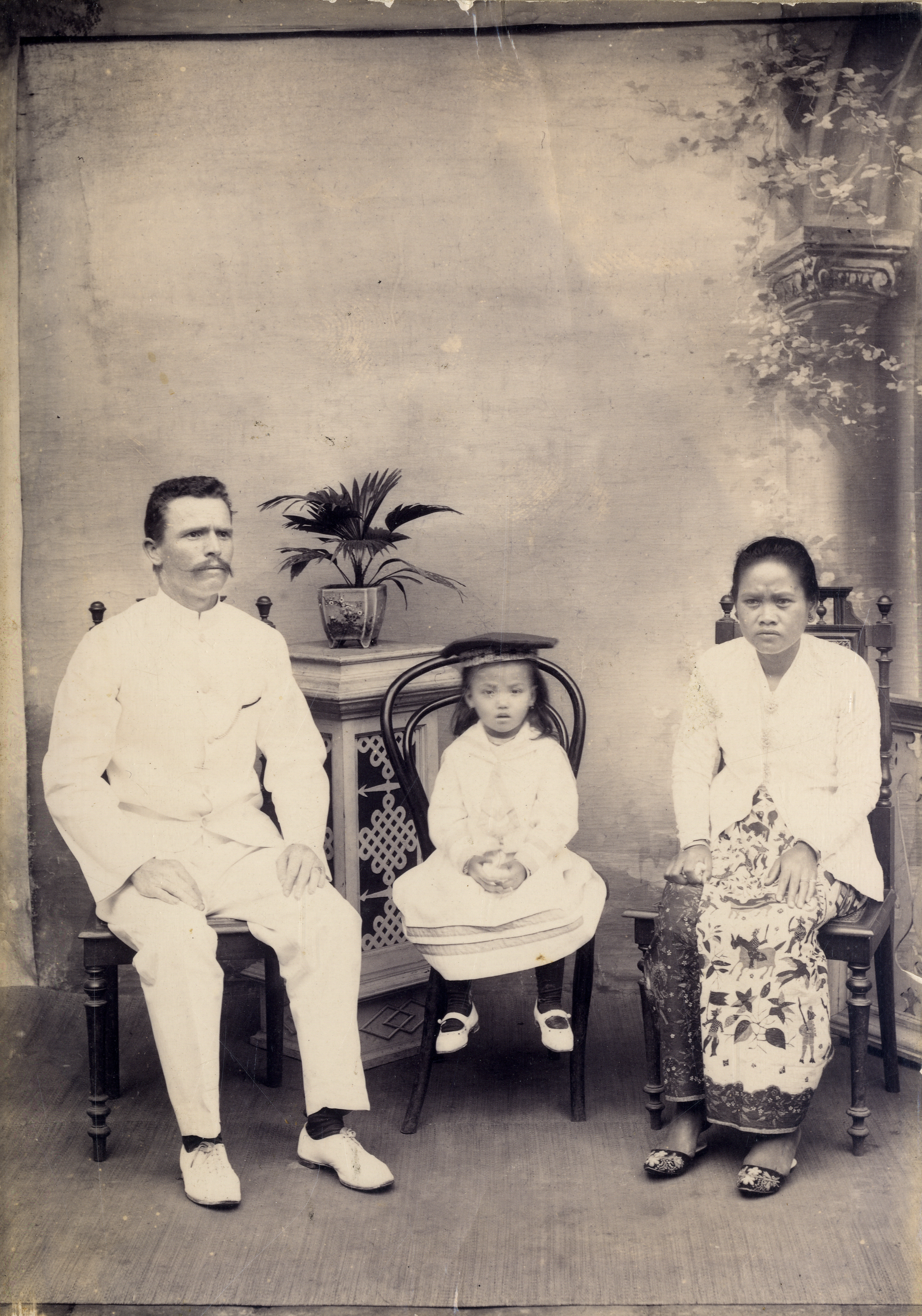
A Dutch man named Van der Velden with his Njai and their daughter.

The njai ([ɲai]; Enhanced Indonesian Spelling System: nyai) were women who were kept as housekeepers, companions, and concubines in the Dutch East Indies (modern-day Indonesia). In the Javanese language, the word nyai meant "sister", but the term later took a more specific meaning. Author Rob Nieuwenhuys described the position of the njai as always subservient, being the white man's housekeeper and companion, before she was his concubine.

== Terminology and description ==
The term njai, also found in the spellings nyai, njaie, nyaie, nyahi or nyi, comes from a Balinese word meaning sister. In Sundanese the term nyai refers to "miss" or young woman, while in Betawi dialect, nyai refers to "grandmother" or elderly lady. The Kamus Besar Bahasa Indonesia gives three definitions for njai: as a term for referring to a married or unmarried woman, as a term for referring to a woman older than the speaker, and for the concubine of a non-Indonesian. It is this last definition which is used here, a definition which gained traction in the 17th century when Balinese njais first became common in the colonial capital of Batavia (now Jakarta). The word, in discussion of the Indies, is sometimes simply translated as "mistress".

A variety of other terms were used to refer to the njai, with a varying degree of positive and negative connotations. In the 19th century the term inlandse huishoudster, or simply huishoudster (housekeeper), was common. The njai were also known as moentji, from the Dutch diminutive mondje, meaning "mouth", and the more negative snaar ("strings"); both referred to the njai's verbal propensities. As the njai could also serve as a translator and language teacher, terms such as boek ("book") and woordenboek ("dictionary") are also noted. Objectification of the njai was found in terms such as meubel ("furniture") and inventarisstuk ("inventory items").

Not all njai were necessarily native Indonesian – in Madelon Szekely-Lulofs's 1931 novel Rubber, njai Kiku San is Japanese.

== History ==
Europeans first arrived in the Indonesian archipelago in the 16th century, and in 1602 the Dutch East India Company was established to ensure Dutch domination of the spice trade. The Europeans established small settlements, and in many of them the European residents were all men. Without contact with Dutch women, they began turning to their female slaves (mostly originating from Sulawesi, Bali, and outside the archipelago) for sexual services. By 1620 the habit had become so prevalent that Governor-General Jan Pieterszoon Coen passed a law forbidding Dutchmen from keeping concubines. To prevent a relapse, Coen began bringing orphans from the Netherlands, termed compagniesdochters, to become wives of company employees. The program, however, had little effect, as the company could not keep up with the demand. There were also concerns that these women were only accepting marriage for personal gain and that they would attempt to draw their husbands back to the Netherlands – and out of the employment of the Dutch East Indies Company.

In the 1650s, Governors-General Carel Reyniersz and Joan Maetsuycker began promoting interracial marriage between Dutchmen and indigenous women, who were thought to be less greedy and less likely to ask their husbands to leave the Indies. The Eurasian daughters of these marriages proved to be popular targets of affections, as marriage to one could help men improve their social position. Many men, however, were unable to marry them, as they generally sought persons already in a position of power. Instead, it was more common for Dutchmen to take Asian women as their partners, as they could not marry without the company's permission and would not be repatriated if they married a non-Christian.

When the British took control of the Indies in 1812, they were shocked to find the practice of concubinage, interracial marriage, and slavery. They attempted to force all elements of Indies society to live in accordance with British morals. However, they were unable to eliminate the keeping of njais, and, indeed, some British men kept a njai of their own.

After the British returned the Indies to the Dutch in 1815, a new wave of immigration – including some women – began. These newcomers, as with the British before them, were shocked by the intermarriage and keeping of njais. Under the new system they established, which pushed for a sharper delineation between Europeans and non-Europeans, a njai marrying a European could be recognized as of a similar stature to Europeans. Those who were not married, however, received no special recognition.

Owing to an economic boom, the early 20th century saw another surge in immigration from Europe. With the European population now of a considerable size, Indies society began drifting towards a more racially divided one. Venues exclusive to one racial group were opened, and European, Chinese, and indigenous people rarely intermingled. Along with this change, the position of men living with a njai became increasingly difficult. The Indies government, following a decree by Governor-General Alexander Willem Frederik Idenburg, would not hire them, and businesses attempted to promote endogamy. In the Netherlands, extensive polemics were written which condemned, from a moral point of view, the practice of keeping a njai: the practice was deemed to be based on nothing but lust, for a njai "could not touch the soul". Concern was also expressed over men's seeming lack of enthusiasm for having children with their njai, leading to high abortion rates.

By the 1910s the number of njais had decreased, although prostitution had become more prevalent. The practice had not died out, however, by the time the Empire of Japan invaded and occupied the Indies. During the occupation, the njai and their mixed-race children were forcefully separated from European men, who were put into internment camps. After the occupation ended in 1945, Sukarno proclaimed an independent Indonesia. During the ensuing revolution, the njai were forced to choose between going with their partners to Europe, or staying in Indonesia; both choices were taken.

== Rights and social status ==
The njai could be sent home with little or no warning, with or without her children. This was common when the European man prepared to marry. The children of a njai were often raised in indigenous traditions, by their mother or by a maid. The fathers would generally not interact with them, preferring to socialize with other European men instead. In the 17th century few could speak Dutch, although later education programs were initiated to promote the use of the language.

The general view of njai was, at first, extremely negative. In the 17th century, they were described as "lustful beasts", with voracious sexual appetites who would not accept money for sex, but pay for it. Coen, in a 1620 letter, described njai as lazy (except in their sexual deeds), stupid, dishonest, and willing to kill the persons they hated.

== In culture ==
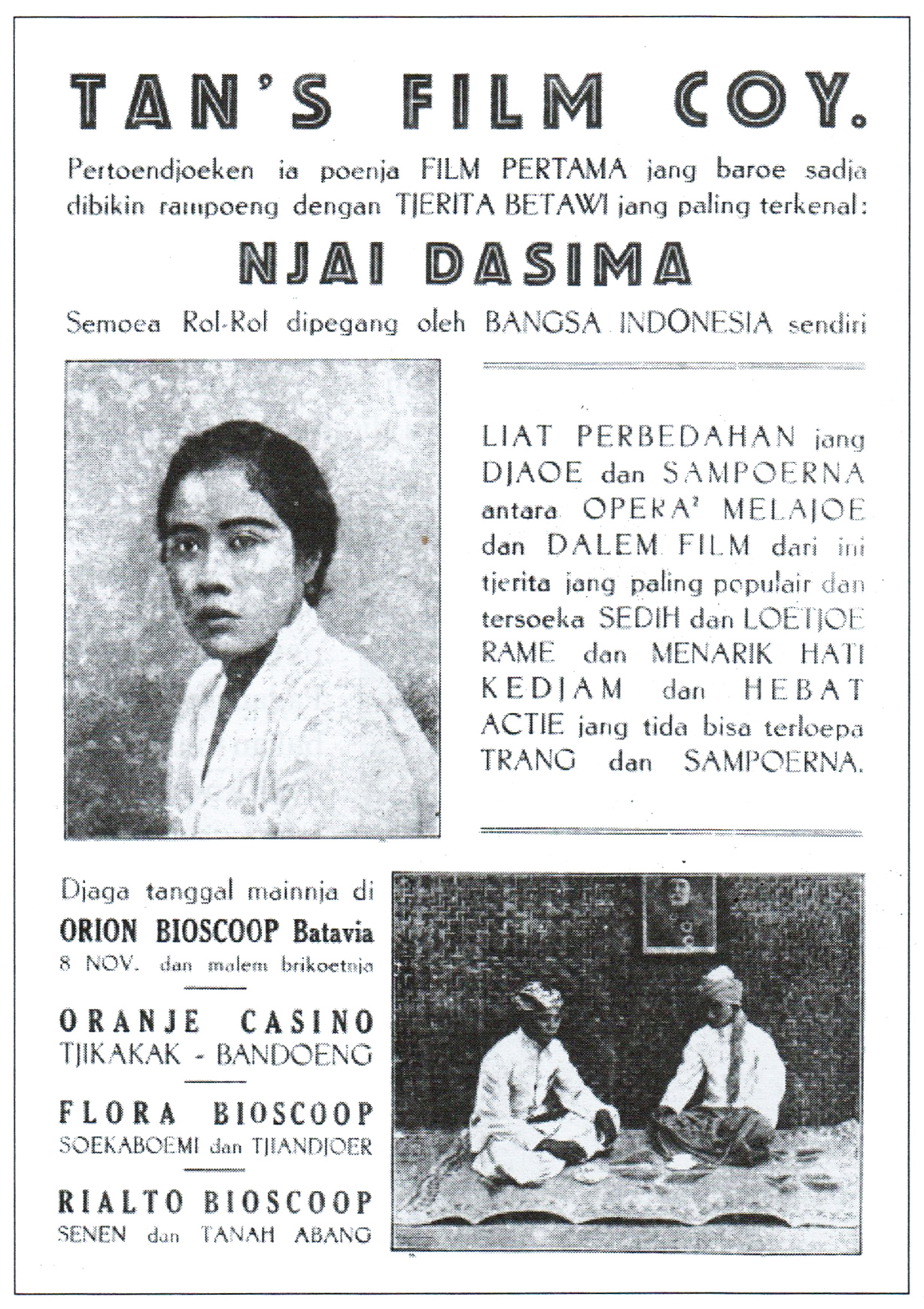
Poster for Njai Dasima (1929)

=== Literature ===
The njai has a broad presence in literature. James Siegel argues that "Dutch shame", which he describes as caused by guilt over the contemporary situation in the Indies that the Dutch colonialists seemed incapable of improving, gave rise to certain stock characters that would explain Dutch political and administrative failure. Siegel cites such characters as the "venal Arab" and the "lustful, greedy Chinese merchant", and the "'deceitful' housekeeper or njai".

Njai characters are common in works of Chinese Malay literature. Some of the earliest were syair (poems), published in 1907 by Lie Kim Hok and Tjiang O. S. respectively in 1897; both were adaptations of Tjerita Njai Dasima. In 1904, Oei Soei Tiong published Njai Alimah. In the 1910s and 1920s, several books were published with njais as the title characters, including Njai Aisah (Tan Boen Kim; 1915), Njai Soemirah (Thio Tjin Boen; 1917), and Njai Marsina (Numa, 1923).

A njai character, named Nyai Ontosoroh, appears in Pramoedya Ananta Toer's epic novel This Earth of Mankind (1980), part of the Buru Quartet.

=== Film ===
Njai are present in early films from the Dutch East Indies, several of which were adapted from novels. In 1929 Tan's Film produced Njai Dasima, an adaptation of Tjerita Njai Dasima. The film was a critical and commercial success, and Indonesian film historian Misbach Yusa Biran writes that cinemas could make up for several days of losses with a single showing. Tjerita Njai Dasima has since been adapted a further three times. A talkie version, directed by Bachtiar Effendi, was released by Tan's by January 1932. Although the 1941 adaptation eliminated Dasima's role as a njai, the 1970 adaptation Samiun and Dasima by Hasmanan reinstated Dasima's role as a njai. Other Indies films featuring njai in key roles include Boenga Roos dari Tjikembang (1931) and De Stem des Bloeds (1932); the latter of these has been read as promoting a positive image of the mixed-race children of njai and Europeans.

== Works cited ==
- Baay, Reggie (2010). Nyai & Pergundikan di Hindia Belanda [Nyai & Concubinage in the Dutch East Indies] (in Indonesian). Jakarta: Komunitas Bambu. ISBN 978-979-3731-78-0.
- Boom, Mattie; Wachlin, Steven (November 2004). "Jacobus Anthonie Meessen". ScherpteDiepte (in Dutch). 21 (36). Leiden University Press. Archived from the original on 8 December 2015.
- Biran, Misbach Yusa (2009). Sejarah Film 1900–1950: Bikin Film di Jawa [History of Film 1900–1950: Making Films in Java] (in Indonesian). Komunitas Bamboo working with the Jakarta Art Council. ISBN 978-979-3731-58-2.
- Salmon, Claudine (1985). Sastra Cina Peranakan dalam Bahasa Melayu [Peranakan Chinese Literature in the Malay Language] (in Indonesian). Jakarta: Balai Pustaka. OCLC 39909566.
