= Nancy Bikin Pembalesan =

1930 film

- Directed by: Lie Tek Swie
- Produced by: Tan Khoen Yauw
- Cinematography: A Loepias
- Production company: Tan's Film
- Release date: 30 May 1930 (Dutch East Indies)
- Country: Dutch East Indies
- Language: Silent

Nancy Bikin Pembalesan (Note: The film is sometimes referred to erroneously with the formal Indonesian spelling "pembalasan" (Heider 1991, p. 15)) (Nancy Takes Revenge) is a 1930 film from the Dutch East Indies. It was released by Tan's Film Company and a sequel to the 1929 two-part film Njai Dasima; it follows Dasima's daughter Nancy on her quest for vengeance. Like its predecessor, it was a commercial and critical success.

== Plot ==
Nancy, the daughter of a native njai (mistress) named Dasima who was murdered several years earlier after leaving her family, returns to Batavia, Dutch East Indies (modern day Jakarta, Indonesia), as an adult. She discovers that her mother's murderers, a delman driver named Samiun and his wife Hayati, have returned from exile. In a dream, Nancy sees her mother, who asks that she hunt down Samiun and Hayati and take revenge upon them.

Intending to calm her mother's soul, Nancy sets out in pursuit of the murderers, who have taken what remained of Dasima's wealth and fled to nearby Banten. With the help of a local politician, she finds and chases Samiun and Hayati. Samiun falls down a hole and dies and, when Hayati tries turning on Nancy to kill her, Dasima's ghost startles the murderer into killing herself.

== Production ==
Nancy Bikin Pembalesan was made as a sequel to the two-part film Njai Dasima, which Tan's Film – owned by the ethnic Chinese brothers Tan Khoen Yauw and Tan Khoen Hian – had released to commercial success the previous year. Unlike the original film, which was based on Tjerita Njai Dasima (The Story of Njai Dasima; 1896) by G. Francis, Nancy Bikin Pembalesan was written especially for Tan's Film. Like most of Tan's productions, it was targeted at lower-class viewers.

The film was directed by Lie Tek Swie, who had previously worked as a film importer, and produced by Tan Koen Yauw. Boby Schonerwald was cast as Nancy. It was silent and black and white and, during production, initially titled Pembalesan Nancy (Nancy's Revenge).

== Release and reception ==
Nancy Bikin Pembalesan was released on 30 May 1930, four months after the second instalment of Njai Dasima. It was a commercial and critical success. A review in Panorama described the imagery as clear, like a Western film, with beautiful views and good characterisation of Nancy, Hayati, and the government official.

== See also ==
- List of films of the Dutch East Indies
