= Dasima =

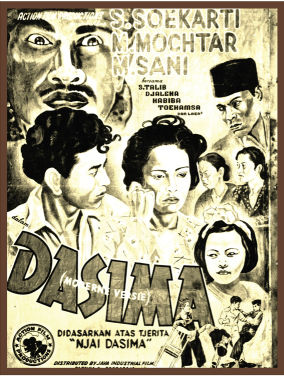
- Theatrical poster
- Directed by: Tan Tjoei Hock
- Produced by: The Teng Chun
- Starring: S. Soekarti; Mohammad Mochtar; M. Sani
- Production company: Java Industrial Film
- Release date: 1940 (Dutch East Indies)
- Country: Dutch East Indies
- Language: Malay

Dasima is a 1940 film from the Dutch East Indies (now Indonesia) directed by Tan Tjoei Hock and produced by The Teng Chun. It is the third adaptation of G. Francis' 1896 novel Tjerita Njai Dasima.

== Plot ==
A merchant named Winata is building up his wealth, and though rarely at home, he provides his wife Dasima and their daughter whatever they desire. However, his jealous neighbours have spread rumours about him. Meanwhile, Dasima feels ignored by her husband's lack of time for her and his inability to get along with her father. This comes to a head when a neighbour, knowing that Winata is attending a business meeting at a nearby restaurant, says that he is womanising there. Dasima believes this, and she and Winata fight.

Dasima eventually leaves home to return to her parents' house, while her father finalises the divorce proceedings. In her hometown, Dasima is seen by Samioen, a gambling addict who is stricken by her flaunted wealth. He and his friend Poeasa arrange to meet her on the road, and over subsequent meetings Samioen works his way into Dasima's heart. Although they are eventually married, Dasima is heartbroken to be treated like a servant by Samioen's mother Saleha and sister Hajati. Samioen, meanwhile, rapidly loses Dasima's wealth gambling. Eventually, Samioen sells all of Dasima's possessions.

A melancholic Dasima realises that she has been deceived. She reminisces on her marriage with Winata, regretting her decision and hoping to make amends. She ultimately attempts to escape, with Samioen and Poeasa giving chase. When she is cornered on a bridge, she jumps into the river in an attempt to escape. After Samioen and Poeasa leave, Dasima is recovered from the river by two fishermen, who bring her to Winata's home. After a month of futile treatment, she gathers the last of her strength and requests her ex-husband's forgiveness before dying.

After Dasima's funeral, Winata vows revenge. He reports the crimes of Samioen and Poeasa to the police, with his report supported by testimony from the two fishermen and a man who had worked with Samioen. However, desiring personal revenge, Winata races ahead of the police to Samioen's home and battles Samioen and Poeasa, emerging victorious. The police arrest Samioen and Poeasa, who are sentenced to life in exile. Saleha and Hajati, meanwhile, fall into poverty. (Note: Derived from the novelisation (Palindih 1941).)

== Production ==
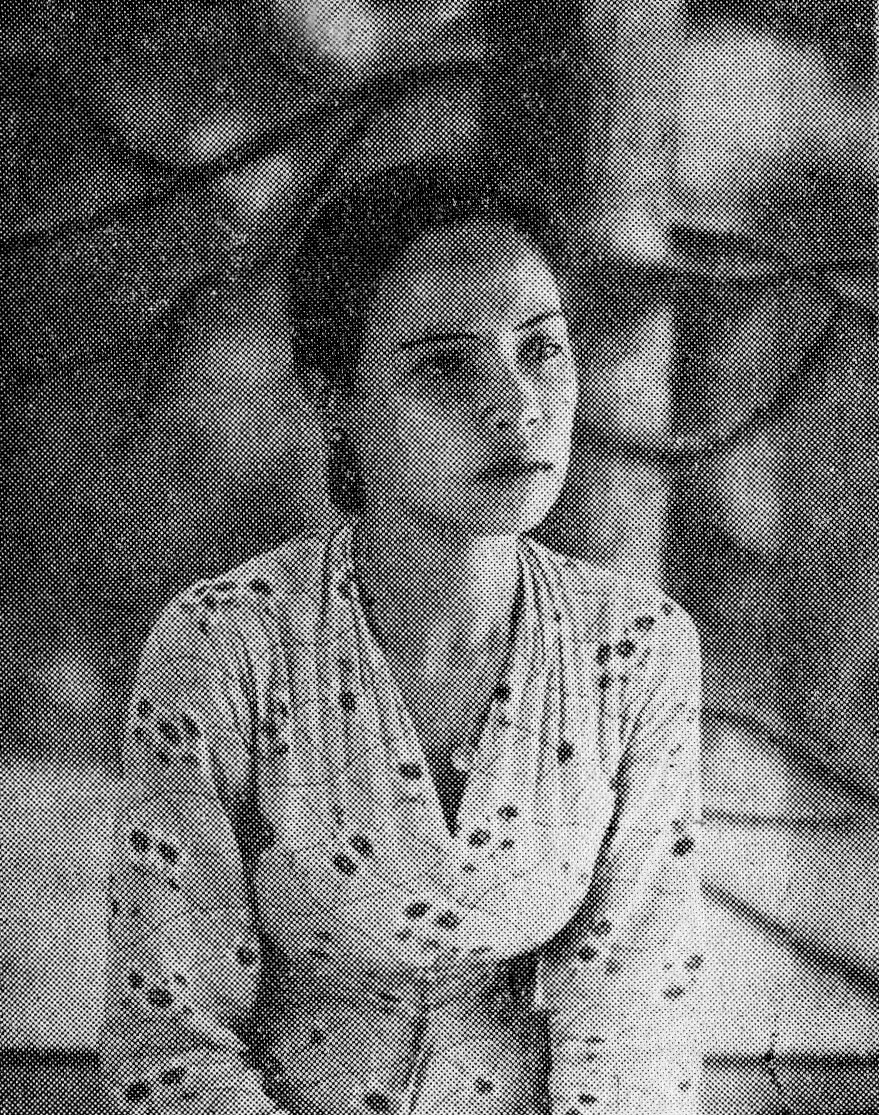
S. Soekarti as Dasima

Dasima, produced by The Teng Chun for Java Industrial Film (JIF), was the directorial debut of Tan Tjoei Hock. The had discovered Tan whilst the latter worked as an unpaid assistant at a drama troupe which frequently performed at Prinsen Park (now Lokasari). Impressed, The asked Tan to join JIF. Though Tan had never been involved in film, he accepted.

Tan adapted the story for Dasima from G. Francis' 1896 novel Tjerita Njai Dasima, which had previously been adapted to the silver screen twice, once in 1929 and once in 1932. These earlier productions, both by Tan's Film, had been similar to extant stage versions of the story. This production, however, was advertised as a "modern version" as it had been brought in accordance to more "modern" tastes. As a result, there were several changes to the story, including the removal of the term njai from the title, a shift from a njai (a concubine) to an ordinary woman as the central character, and the removal of mystical elements present in the original work.

The black-and-white film featured cinematography by WT Wei, with HB Angin as artistic director. It starred S. Soekarti, Mohammad Mochtar, and M. Sani. It also featured S. Talib, Djaleha, Toehamsa, and Habibah. Mochtar had been with Tan's since 1939's Alang-Alang. In these earlier films he had been partnered with Hadidjah as the romantic leads. Dasima was his first film without her; she was replaced by Soekarti, who had no previous acting experience.

== Legacy ==
The film was released in 1940. Tan went on to become the most active film director in the Indies between 1940 and 1941, directing nine films in the time. JIF and its two subsidiaries, Action Film and Jakarta Pictures, released over a dozen further films before all were shut down following the Japanese occupation of the Indies in 1942. Mochtar and Soekarsih acted in one further film together, a 1940 adaptation of Swan Pen's Melati van Agam, before Soekarsih left acting.

The film is likely lost. The American visual anthropologist Karl G. Heider writes that all Indonesian films from before 1950 are lost. However, JB Kristanto's Katalog Film Indonesia (Indonesian Film Catalogue) records several as having survived at Sinematek Indonesia's archives, and Biran writes that several Japanese propaganda films have survived at the Netherlands Government Information Service.

== Works cited ==
- Biran, Misbach Yusa (2009). Sejarah Film 1900–1950: Bikin Film di Jawa [History of Film 1900–1950: Making Films in Java] (in Indonesian). Jakarta: Komunitas Bamboo working with the Jakarta Art Council. ISBN 978-979-3731-58-2.
- "Dasima". filmindonesia.or.id (in Indonesian). Jakarta: Konfiden Foundation. Archived from the original on 2 December 2013.
- "Filmografi Tan Tjoei Hock" [Filmography for Tan Tjoei Hock]. filmindonesia.or.id (in Indonesian). Jakarta: Konfiden Foundation. Archived from the original on 29 October 2013.
- Heider, Karl G (1991). Indonesian Cinema: National Culture on Screen. Honolulu: University of Hawaii Press. ISBN 978-0-8248-1367-3.
- "Kredit Dasima" [Credits for Dasima]. filmindonesia.or.id (in Indonesian). Jakarta: Konfiden Foundation. Archived from the original on 29 October 2013.
- Palindih, Roestam S. (1941). Dasima (in Indonesian). Yogyakarta: Kolff-Buning. OCLC 67870936.
- "Tan Tjoei Hock". Encyclopedia of Jakarta (in Indonesian). Jakarta: Jakarta City Government. Archived from the original on 29 October 2013.
