= Njai Dasima (1932 film) =

1932 film directed by Bachtiar Effendi

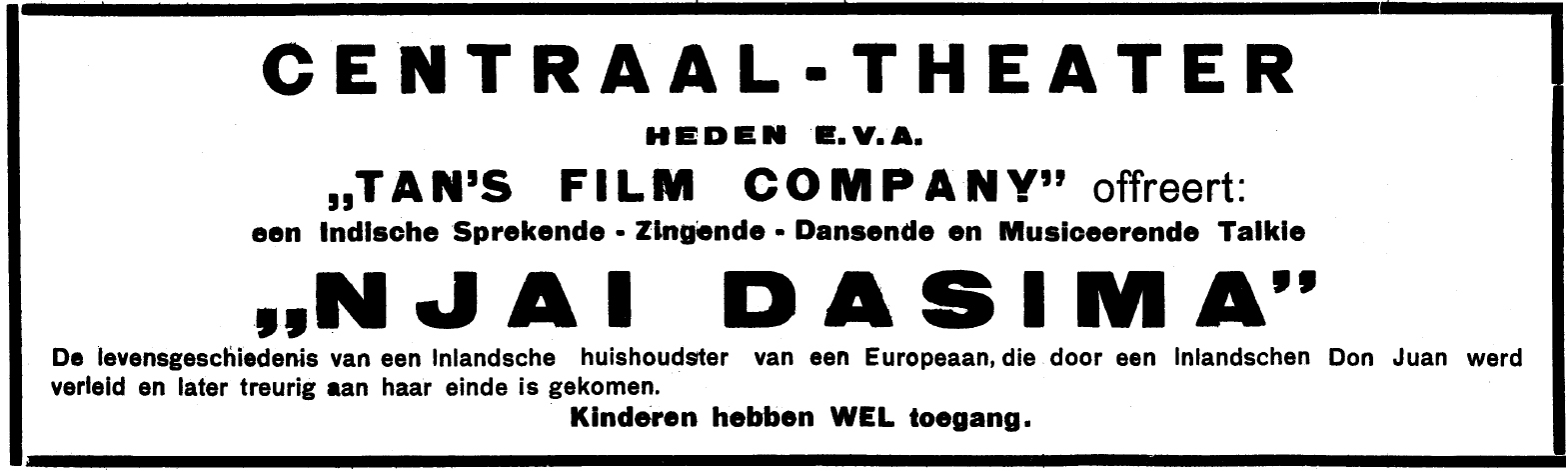
- Newspaper advertisement
- Directed by: Bachtiar Effendi
- Produced by: Tan Khoen Yauw
- Starring: Momo; Oesman
- Cinematography: G. Krugers
- Production company: Tan's Film
- Release date: 1932 (Dutch East Indies)
- Country: Dutch East Indies
- Language: Vernacular Malay

Njai Dasima (Indonesian: [ˈɲai daˈsima]; Perfected Spelling: Nyai Dasima) is a 1932 film from the Dutch East Indies which was directed by Bachtiar Effendi for Tan's Film. It was the second film adapted from G. Francis' 1896 novel Tjerita Njai Dasima, following a silent version in 1929. Starring Momo and Oesman, it followed a young Sundanese njai (concubine) who is tricked into marrying a man who does not love her and ultimately killed for her money. The film, the first talkie produced by its company, was also the first directed by a native Indonesian. The now-lost work received mixed critical reception.

== Plot ==
Dasima is a njai (concubine) for the Englishman Edward William. Together with their daughter, Nancy, the couple live in a home near Gambir Square in Batavia (modern day Jakarta). Their happy life is disturbed after the delman driver Samioen falls in love with Dasima, despite already being married to Hajati. He attempts to use magic (goena-goena) to win her heart, and asks an egg merchant, Mak Boejoeng, to frighten Dasima by telling the young woman that she has committed the sin of zina (extramarital sex).

Samioen eventually succeeds, and Dasima goes to live with him and Hajati, taking along her gold and jewels. Hajati has agreed to let Samioen take a second wife as she wants Dasima's money, which she will use for gambling. When Dasima realises that she has been tricked, she begins to keep a close eye on her remaining wealth. So that he can take all of her remaining funds, Samioen calls the thug Poeasa and together they plan to kill Dasima. One night, as Dasima goes to hear a story-telling, the two accost her, kill her, and throw her body off a bridge. Samioen and Poeasa are later caught and sentenced to hang for their crime.

== Production ==
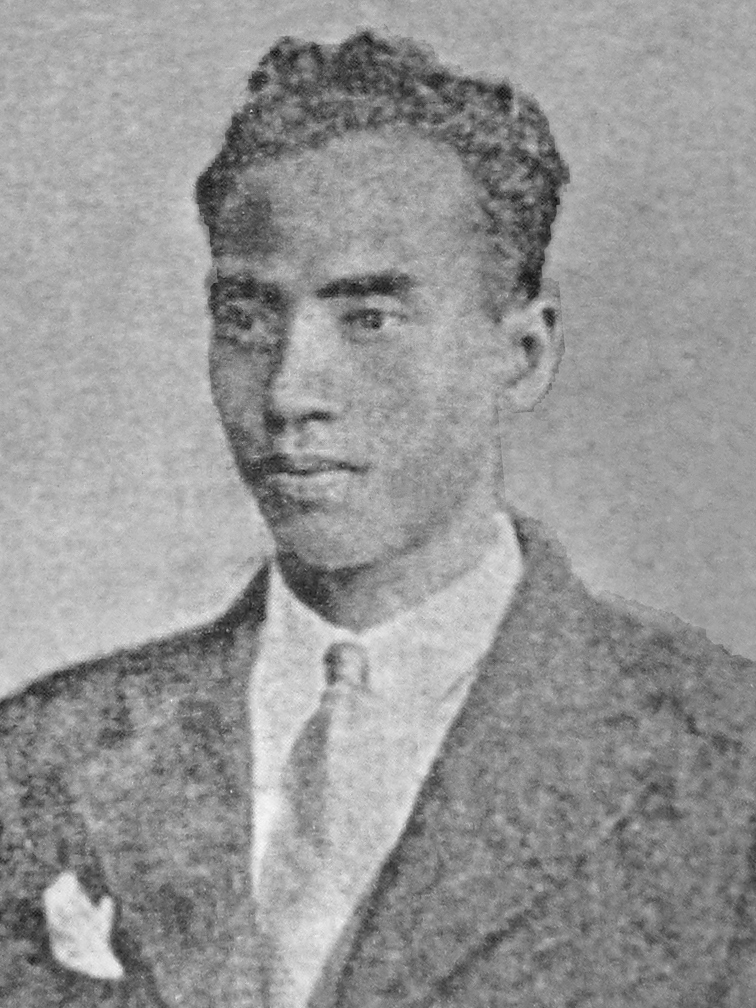
Bachtiar Effendi, director

Njai Dasima was directed by Bachtiar Effendi for Tan's Film, a production company owned by the Tan brothers. With this he became the first native Indonesian film director in the Indies. It starred Momo and Oesman. The story was adapted from G. Francis' 1896 novel Tjerita Njai Dasima, which Tan's had already adapted in 1929 with the same name for their first release. The story was already well known in Batavia (now Jakarta), in part because it was a popular part of stage performers' repertoires. To ensure the quality of the story, Effendi worked with a scenario and, later, shooting script – two items which had, until then, never been used for a domestic production.

This was the first sound film released by Tan's, but far from the first in the Indies. The earliest sound films released in the Indies, Fox Movietone Follies of 1929 and The Rainbow Man, were both shown in 1929. The following year, George Krugers' Karnadi Anemer Bangkong, a domestic part-talkie, was also released, becoming the first domestic sound film. Two other directors had followed with full-talkies in 1931: The Teng Chun with Boenga Roos dari Tjikembang and the Wong brothers with Indonesia Malaise. In order to ensure the quality of the sound, Tan's hired Krugers and his single-system camera to do the cinematography and sound direction for this black-and-white film.

== Release and reception ==
Njai Dasima was released by January 1932 and advertised as a "speaking, singing, dancing, and music talkie". (Note: Original: "Sprekende – Zingende – Dansende en Musicerende talkie") It was open to audiences of all ages, including children. Critical reviews were mixed. One newspaper editorial, noting that the pamphlets described the film as "a hundred times better than [the contemporary film] Huwen op Bevel", (Note: Original: "... honderd maal veel beter dan „Huwen op bevel"".) was scornful, stating that such a claim had very little validity as "the quality of the native films so far are rubbish". (Note: Original: "... de kwaliteit van het kunststuk daar de inlandsche films tot nu toe prullen zijn.".) The review then indicated numerous shortcomings in the selection of music, the cinematography, before concluding that the film did, overall, represent progress, praising the actor who played Puasa and noting a distinct lack of scenes unrelated to the plot. However, Armijn Pane, in a 1950 reflective review, wrote that the quality of the work was overall quite good.

Effendi did not direct another film until 1951, with Djiwa Pemuda, and the first subsequent native film director, Andjar Asmara, only began his career in 1940, with Kartinah. Tan's shut down production soon after Njai Dasima's release, although it was eventually reestablished in 1938. After releasing several commercial successes, particularly Fatima (1938), it was permanently shut down in 1942, with the Japanese occupation of the Indies.

The film is likely lost. The American visual anthropologist Karl G. Heider writes that all Indonesian films from before 1950 are lost. However, JB Kristanto's Katalog Film Indonesia (Indonesian Film Catalogue) records several as having survived at Sinematek Indonesia's archives, and Indonesian film historian Misbach Yusa Biran writes that several Japanese propaganda films have survived at the Netherlands Government Information Service.

== Works cited ==
- "Bachtiar Effendy". Filmindonesia.or.id (in Indonesian). Konfidan Foundation. Archived from the original on 15 December 2013.
- Biran, Misbach Yusa (2009). Sejarah Film 1900–1950: Bikin Film di Jawa [History of Film 1900–1950: Making Films in Java] (in Indonesian). Jakarta: Komunitas Bamboo working with the Jakarta Art Council. ISBN 978-979-3731-58-2.
- "Njai Dasima". filmindonesia.or.id (in Indonesian). Jakarta: Konfiden Foundation. Archived from the original on 3 April 2014.
- Heider, Karl G (1991). Indonesian Cinema: National Culture on Screen. Honolulu: University of Hawaii Press. ISBN 978-0-8248-1367-3.
- "Over Inlandsche films. Deli Bioscoop, Njai Dasima" [On Indies Films. Deli Theatre, Njai Dasima]. De Sumatra Post (in Dutch). Medan: J. Hallermann. 3 February 1932. p. 6.
- Said, Salim (1982). Profil Dunia Film Indonesia [Profile of Indonesian Cinema] (in Indonesian). Jakarta: Grafiti Pers. OCLC 9507803.
- "(untitled)". De Indische Courant (in Dutch). Surabaya. 14 January 1932. p. 14.
