= Marah Roesli =

Indonesian writer

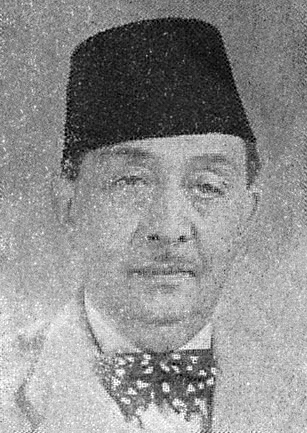
- Marah Roesli, 1954
- Born: Marah Roesli; 7 August 1889; Padang, Dutch East Indies
- Died: 17 January 1968 (aged 78); Bandung, West Java, Indonesia
- Writing career
- Genre: Poetry
- Subject: Literature
- Notable work: Sitti Nurbaya (1920)

Marah Roesli ([ˈmarah ˈrusli]; full name: Marah Rusli bin Abu Bakar) was an Indonesian writer.

== Biography ==
Marah Roesli was born in Padang, West Sumatra on 7 August 1889, and died in Bandung, West Java on 17 January 1968. He was one of the most well-known Indonesian authors from the Balai Pustaka period. He is famous for his novel Sitti Nurbaya, which tells the story of a teenage girl who was forced to marry a man much older than herself to recompense his father's debt. Like other Minangkabau authors, such as Hamka, Ali Akbar Navis, and Abdul Muis, his novels centre on the theme of the increasingly bankrupt Minangkabau culture.

Marah Roesli's father, Sultan Abu Bakar, was a nobleman with the rank Sultan Pangeran. Against his family's wishes, Marah Roesli married a Sundanese woman born in Bogor in 1911, and they had three children, two boys and one girl. Although this marriage was strongly abhorred by his parents, he did not give it up.

Although he is known as a famous novelist, he was a veterinarian by profession. Unlike Taufik Ismail and Asrul Sani, who both completely left their practices as veterinarians to become authors, Marah Roesli kept working in that profession until he retired in 1952 with the title of Head Veterinary. He loved literature from a young age, and always loved listening to stories from the itinerant story tellers in Western Sumatra, and reading literature.

== Recognition ==
In the history of Indonesian literature, Marah Roesli is noted as the first author of a novel, and was designated by Jassin as the "Father of the Modern Indonesian Novel". Before the first novels were written in Indonesia, the prose literature was more similar to folk stories.

Marah Roesli had higher education, and was able to access many books from the Western tradition, especially the Modernism literature prevalent at the time. His works convey the need to move away from the strong traditional values, especially of the Minangkabau people's and embrace the development of the period, and. In light of this, his best known novel Sitti Nurbaya can be read as an attempt to free the people from the traditions that held them back and stopped young people from following their dreams. The story creates a strong impression on the reader, which is true to this day. After more than 80 years, this book is still being constantly discussed and read.

In addition to Sitti Nurbaya, Marah Roesli also wrote several other novels. However, Sitti Nurbaya is the best known one. The novel received the annual price in literature from the Government of Indonesia in 1969, and has been translated to Russian.

== Bibliography ==
- Rusli, Marah (1922). Gadis jang malang ["The old curiosity shop" by Charles Dickens] (in Indonesian). Weltevreden: Balai Poestaka. OCLC 63841028.
- Rusli, Marah (1966). Siti Nurbaya (in Malay). Kuala Lumpur: Pustaka Melayu Baru. OCLC 11150773.
- Rusli, Marah (1966). Anak dan kemanakan (in Malay). Melaka: Abbas Bandong. OCLC 10385375.
- Rusli, Marah (1978). La Hami (in Indonesian). Jakarta: Balai Pustaka. OCLC 9679653.
- Rusli, Marah (1982). Sitti Nurbaya : kasih tak sampai (in Indonesian). Jakarta, Indonesia: Balai Pustaka. OCLC 9688667.
- Rusli, Marah (2000). Anak dan kemenakan (in Indonesian). Jakarta: Balai Pustaka. ISBN 9789796661695. OCLC 52621860.
- Rusli, Marah (2009). Sitti Nurbaya : a love unrealized. Jakarta: Lontar Foundation. ISBN 978-979-8083-79-2. OCLC 741104187.
- Memang Jodoh (autobiographical)
- Tesna Zahera (play)
