= Bachtiar Effendi =

Indonesian film actor and director

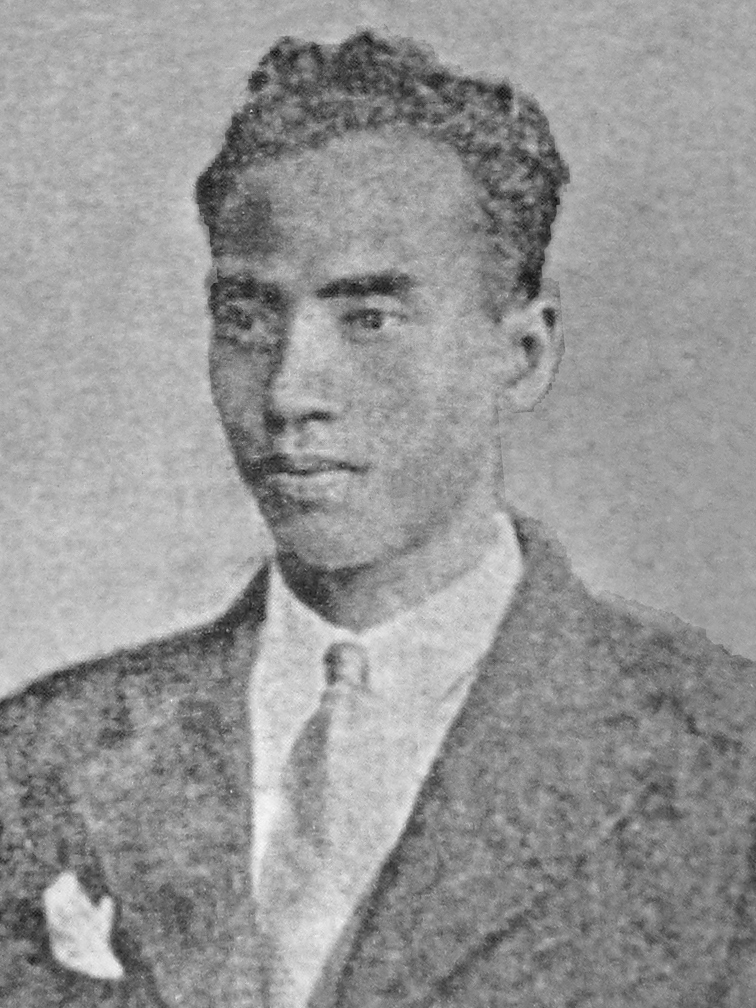
- Effendi, 1939
- Born: After 1903; Padang, Dutch East Indies
- Died: 1 April 1976; Rome, Italy
- Known for: Acting and filmmaking
- Spouses: Suhara Effendi; Zuhara

Bachtiar Effendi (also spelled Bachtiar Effendy; after 1903 – 1 April 1976) was an Indonesian film actor and director who also served as a cultural critic. Beginning his film career in 1930, he made several works for Tan's Film before joining a drama troupe.

After spending ten years in British Malaya, he returned to Indonesia and directed several more films before being sent to Italy as a press attaché. He lived in the country for most of the remainder of his life, having found disfavour after supporting the Revolutionary Government of the Republic of Indonesia.

== Early life ==
Effendi was the younger brother of Rustam Effendi, a communist-sympathising poet born in 1903. Their family was originally from Padang, West Sumatra, although the brothers left Padang for their education. Effendi dropped out of senior high school – a level of schooling already more than most native children received – and instead of becoming a law student as his parents intended he became a labourer at Tan's Film, working in decor.

Effendi acted in his first acting role in 1930 with Si Ronda. He then became an assistant director with Melati van Agam (1931), also taking a minor acting role. He directed his first film, the talkie Njai Dasima, in 1932, becoming the first native Indonesian film director in the Indies. After, he left Tan's to replace Andjar Asmara as editor in chief of Doenia Film, a Malay-language film magazine.

Effendi joined the Dardanella theatre troupe in 1936, working as an actor. Andjar served as a dramatist. In 1936 the two left Dardanella to establish the Bollero troupe, and sometime later Effendi married Suhara, the sister of Andjar's wife Ratna. After Andjar left the troupe in 1940 to work for The Teng Chun's Java Industrial Film, Effendi remained leader of Bollero, which became increasingly politicised and vocal against the widespread corruption of the time. During this time he married Zuhara.

== Post-independence ==
The troupe stayed in Malacca until 1945; aside from his work with Bollero, Effendi was involved with the domestic film industry and became a "culture warrior" in the press. Effendi was arrested in Singapore for refusing to support the British, but after his release he acted the 1949 film Seruan Merdeka (Cry of Freedom). He returned to Indonesia – which had declared its independence in 1945 – by 1950 and began directing several films for the National Film Company (Perusahaan Film Nasional), including Djiwa Pemuda (Young Soul; 1951), a cry for former soldiers to work towards national development.

In 1955 Effendi served as press attaché in Italy. In the late 1950s he stated his support for the Revolutionary Government of the Republic of Indonesia (Pemerintah Revolusioner Republik Indonesia, or PRRI), an ill-fated attempt at a revolution. After the PRRI was quashed, Effendi chose to stay in Italy, reportedly taking bit parts in Italian films. After Sukarno's government lost power in the 1960s, Effendi began occasionally returning to Indonesia, partly to visit his family, partly to act, and partly to ease Italian-Indonesian cooperation. He died in Rome on 1 April 1976.

== Filmography ==
=== Cast ===
Year	Film	Role(s)
1930	Si Ronda	Ronda
1930	Melati van Agam (Jasmine of Agam)	–
1947	Singapura di Waktu Malam (Night Time in Singapore)	
1951	Bunga Rumah Makan (The Restaurant's Flower)	–

=== Crew ===
Year	Film	Role(s)
1932	Njai Dasima	Director and scriptwriter
1951	Djiwa Pemuda (Young Soul)	Director
1953	Meratjun Sukma (Poison the Soul)	Director
1954	Antara Tugas dan Tjinta (Between Duty and Love)	Director
