= Njai Dasima (1929 film) =

1929 film

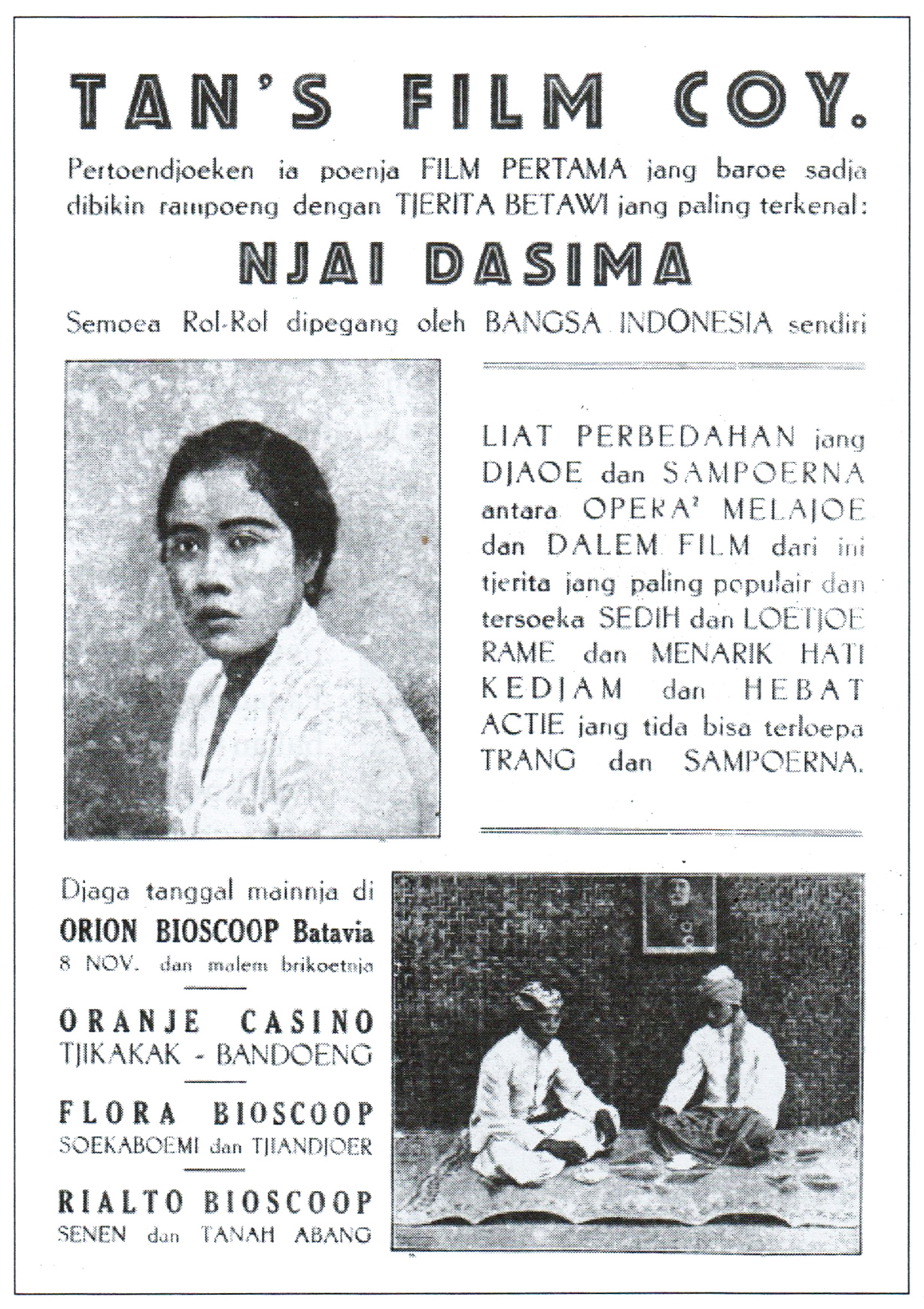
- Ad in Doenia Film
- Directed by: Lie Tek Swie
- Written by: Tan Khoen Yauw
- Produced by: Tan Khoen Yauw
- Starring: Nurhani; Anah; Wim Lender; Momo
- Production company: Tan's Film
- Release date: November 1929 (Dutch East Indies)
- Country: Dutch East Indies
- Language: Silent

Njai Dasima (Indonesian: [ˈɲai daˈsima]; Perfected Spelling: Nyai Dasima) is a 1929 silent film from the Dutch East Indies (modern day Indonesia). It details the fall of a rich mistress at the hands of a greedy delman driver. The first film released by Tan's Film, the film – adapted from an 1896 novel – was a critical and commercial success. It was released in two parts, followed by a sequel, and remade another two times by 1940.

== Plot ==
=== Part 1 ===
Dasima (Nurhani) is a nyai, or a native mistress, for the Englishman Edward William. The couple and their daughter Nancy live in a home near Gambir Square in Batavia (modern day Jakarta). The delman driver Samiun has fallen in love with Dasima, despite already being married to Hayati. He attempts to use spells to win her heart. He also has an egg merchant, Mak Buyung, frighten Dasima by telling the young woman that she has committed the sin of zina (extramarital sex). Samiun eventually succeeds, and Dasima goes to live with him and Hayati, taking along gold and jewels. Hayati has agreed to let Samiun take a second wife as she wants Dasima's money, which she will use for gambling.

=== Part 2 ===
Dasima eventually realises that she has been tricked and begins to keep a close eye on her remaining wealth. To get at it, Samiun calls the thug Puasa and tells him to rob the young woman. At night, as Dasima goes to hear the story of Amir Hamzah at a nearby village, Puasa accosts her. He panics when she screams and kills her, then throws her body off a bridge; it washes up behind Williams' home. Samiun and Puasa are caught and sentenced to hang.

== Production ==
Njai Dasima was the first film produced by Tan's Film, owned by ethnic Chinese. Directed at native viewers, Njai Dasima was filmed from September to October 1929.

The story was based on a novel written by G. Francis in 1896, which was advertised as based on a true story from 1813 Batavia. The story had previously been adapted by Toneel Melayu troupe. Tan's often adapted the troupe's work, and Njai Dasima was among their most successful. Like most native adaptations of the novel, Njai Dasima avoided the anti-Muslim undertones present in the original work.

Njai Dasima was directed by Lie Tek Swie and produced by Tan Khoen Yauw. Nurhani, who played Dasima, was cast from the general populace. Other stars included Anah, Wim Lender, and Momo. The cinematography was handled by Andre Lupias.

== Release and reception ==
Njai Dasima was released in November 1929; it was released in two parts; the conclusion of the story was released in 1930. It was a commercial success, to the point that the Indonesian film historian Misbach Yusa Biran writes that a cinema could make up several days losses with a single showing of the film. Despite critical acclaim for her acting, Nurhani never played another film role.

The film critic Kwee Tek Hoay, known for his scathing reviews, praised the visuals in Njai Dasima and the acting of Nurhani and the girl who played Nancy. However, he criticised the other actors, describing the one who played Williams as too young, the one who played Samiun as looking like a bellboy, and the one who played Mak Buyung as looking half crazy. The magazine Doenia Film praised the filmography and acting by the lead characters. The magazine Panorama later wrote that Njai Dasima was an important film for the Indies, as it showed that locally produced films could compete with foreign, especially American, ones.

The film spawned a sequel, Nancy Bikin Pembalesan (Nancy Takes Revenge; 1930). The critically acclaimed sequel followed an adult Nancy in a quest to avenge her mother's death, leading to Samiun falling down a well and Hayati killing herself. Tan's Film made another adaptation of Njai Dasima in 1932, which Armijn Pane described as the first talkie in the Indies with good sound quality. Yet another adaptation, entitled Dasima, was directed by Tan Tjoei Hock in 1940.

== See also ==
- List of films of the Dutch East Indies
