= Cinema of Indonesia =

- No. of screens: 2,354 (2024)

Produced feature films (2024)
- Total: 241 ▲

Number of admissions (2024)
- Total: 126,220,000
- National films: 80,210,000

Gross box office (2017)
- Total: $345 million

The cinema of Indonesia refers to films produced domestically in Indonesia. The statutory Indonesian Film Board, or BPI, defines Indonesian films as "movies that are made by or using Indonesian resources whose Intellectual Property Right is owned either entirely or partly by Indonesian citizen or Indonesian legal entity".

Cinema in Indonesia dates back to the early 1900s. Until the 1920s, most cinemas in Indonesia were created by foreign studios, mostly from Europe and the United States, whose films would then be imported to the country. Most of these films were silent documentaries and feature films from France and the United States. Many documentaries about the nature and life of Indonesia were sponsored by the Dutch East Indies government, and were usually made by Dutch or Western European studios. The first domestically produced documentaries in Indonesia were produced in 1911. However, the first domestically produced film in the Dutch East Indies was in 1926: Loetoeng Kasaroeng, a silent film and adaptation of the Sundanese legend of the same name. During 1926, there were two movie theatres, the Oriental and the Elita, in Bandung. The first movie theatre in Jakarta was the Alhamra Theatre, which opened in 1931.

Indonesian cinema began dominating most movie theaters in big cities in the 1980s and started to compete in international film festivals. Around this era, young stars like Onky Alexander, Meriam Bellina, Lydia Kandou, Nike Ardilla, Paramitha Rusady, and Desy Ratnasari dominated the silver screen with films like Catatan si Boy (Boy's Diary) and Blok M.

Indonesian film slowly lost its place and popularity due to the domination of Hollywood and foreign films in movie theaters throughout the 1990s. In the wake of the Indonesian financial crisis and political movements, the industry struggled to raise public interest in attending movie theaters, and most films stuck to teenage dramas, horror, and adult genres. After the Reform in the beginning of 2000, the Indonesian film industry was strengthened by a growing number of young filmmakers. While the industry was still adjusting to the new constitutions, Indonesian cinema started to reconstruct its identity and regain its former popularity.

The film industry is currently the fastest-growing subsector of Indonesia's creative economy. The number of moviegoers in the country were more than 52 million in 2019. In 2023, the local film industry in Indonesia set a new record with 20 films attracting over 1 million viewers each.

The Indonesian film industry released 230 films in 2019. As of 2025, there were about 2,354 screens in Indonesia. 21 Cineplex (which owns PT Omega Film, which monopolizes distribution of films distributed by the American major film studios), CGV Cinemas (previously Blitzmegaplex), and Cinépolis (previously Cinemaxx) currently dominate the movie theatre industry in Indonesia.

== History ==
=== Colonial era ===
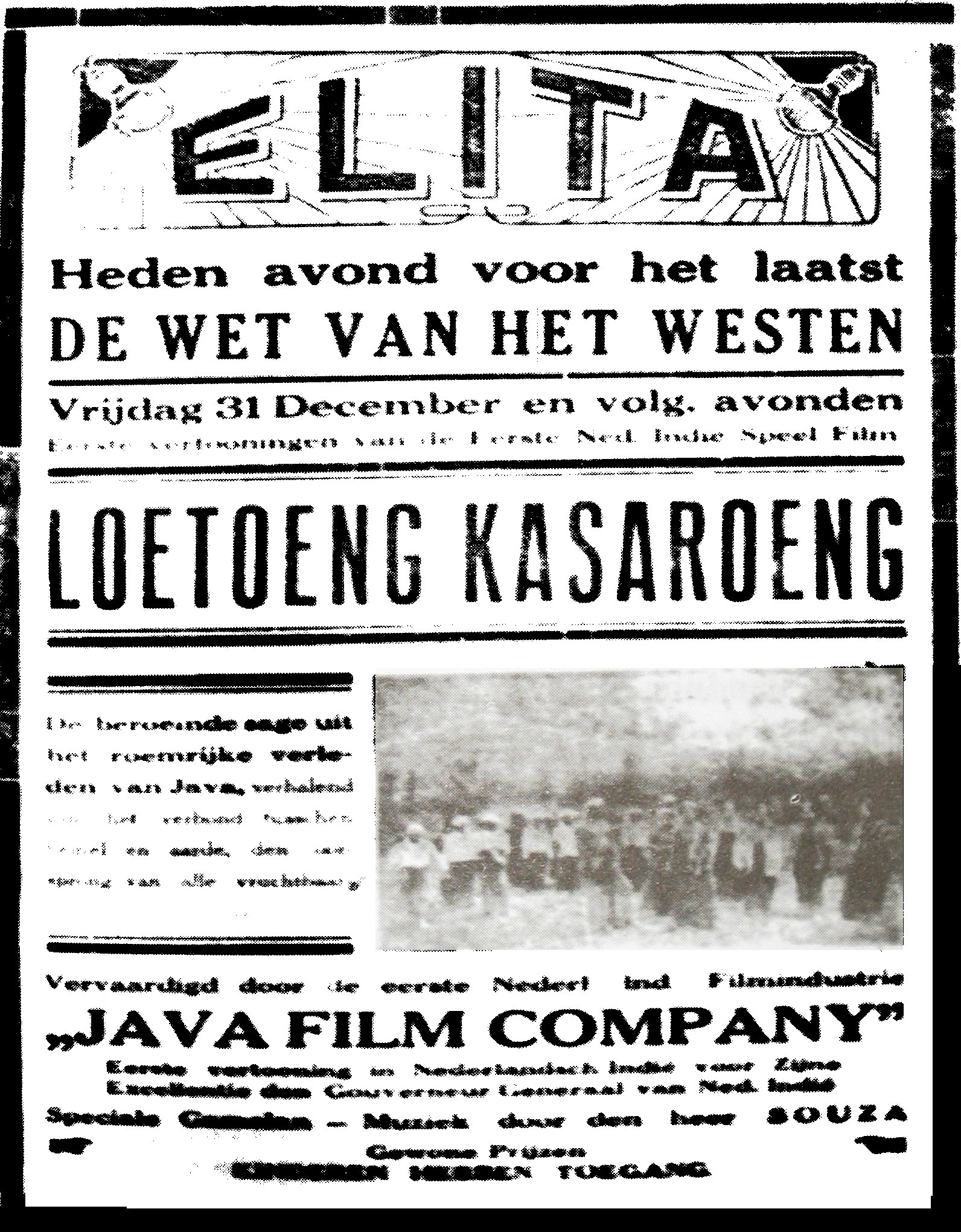
Advertisement for Loetoeng Kasaroeng, the first fiction film produced in what is now Indonesia.

The first showing of films in the Dutch East Indies was in 1900, and over the next twenty years, foreign productions—which were mostly from the United States—were imported and shown throughout the country. Domestic production of documentaries began in 1911 but were unable to compete with imported works. By 1923, a local feature film production spearheaded by the Middle East Film Co. was announced, but the work was not completed.

The first domestically produced film in the Indies was Loetoeng Kasaroeng, a 1926 silent film by Dutch director L. Heuveldorp. This adaptation of the Sundanese legend was made with local actors by the NV Java Film Company in Bandung and premiered on 31 December 1926 at the Elite and Majestic Theatres in Bandung. The following year, George Krugers—who had served as a technician and cinematographer for Loetoeng Kasaroeng—released his directorial debut (the second film in the Indies), Eulis Atjih. Owing to Loetoeng Kasaroeng's limited release, Kruger was able to advertise his film as the colony's first. A year later, the second novel to be adapted to film in Indonesia, Setangan Berloemoer Darah, was produced by Tan Boen Soan.

Ethnic Chinese directors and producers, capitalising on the success of films produced in Shanghai, China, became involved in the colony's cinema beginning in 1928, when Nelson Wong completed Lily van Java. Although the Wongs went on hiatus, other ethnic Chinese became involved in film. Several Chinese-owned start-ups are recorded from 1929 onward, including Nancing Film with Resia Boroboedoer (1928) and Tan's Film with Njai Dasima (1929). By the early 1930s, Chinese-owned businesses were the dominating force in the country's film industry.

After the Great Depression reached the Indies, production slowed tremendously. The Dutch East Indies government collected higher taxes and cinemas sold tickets at lower prices, ensuring that there was a meagre profit margin for local films. As a result, cinemas in the colony mainly showed Hollywood productions, while the domestic industry decayed. The Teng Chun, who had made his debut in 1931 with Boenga Roos dari Tjikembang, was the only producer able to release films during 1934 and early 1935; his low-budget but popular films were mainly inspired by Chinese mythology or martial arts, and although aimed at ethnic Chinese, proved popular among native audiences because of their action sequences.

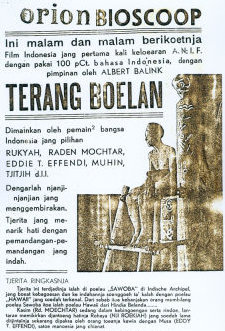
Poster for Terang Boelan, one of three films credited with reviving the Indies' failing film industry.

In an attempt to show that locally produced, well-made films could be profitable, the Dutch journalist Albert Balink, who had no formal film experience, produced Pareh in 1935 in collaboration with Nelson Wong and his brothers. Though the film, costing 20 times as much as most contemporary productions, was an ultimate failure, it affected The Teng Chun's directorial style; the latter took less traditional stories. Balink's next attempt, Terang Boelan, was released two years later. Unlike Pareh, Terang Boelan was a marked commercial success, earning 200,000 Straits dollars (then equivalent to US$114,470) in two months. According to American visual anthropologist Karl G. Heider, these two films are Indonesia's most important films of the 1930s.

The triple successes of Terang Boelan, Fatima (1938), and Alang-Alang (1939) revived the domestic film industry. Four new production houses were established in 1940, and actors and actresses previously attached to theatrical troupes entered the film industry, which was reaching new audiences. The new works—fourteen in 1940 and thirty in 1941—generally followed the formula established by Terang Boelan: songs, beautiful scenery, and romance. Others, such as Asmara Moerni, attempted to reach the growing native intelligentsia by drawing journalists or figures from the growing nationalist movement into cinema.

=== Japanese occupation ===
After its genesis during the Dutch colonial era, the Indonesian film industry was co-opted by Japanese occupiers during the Second World War as a propaganda tool. The Japanese government immediately halted all production of film. Then, the Office of Cultural Enlightenment (啓民文化指導所), which was headed by Ishimoto Tokichi, appropriated facilities from all filmmaking organisations, consolidating them into a single studio which became the Jakarta branch of Nippon Eigasha (日本映画社), or Nichi'ei. The majority of films made in Indonesia under the Japanese were educational films and newsreels produced for audiences in Japan. The Jakarta branch was strategically placed at the extreme southern end of Japan's empire and soon became a centre of newsreel production. Popular news serials such as News from the South and Berita Film di Djawa were produced. Japanese newsreels promoted such topics as conscripted "romusha" labourers (ロムシャの生活, 1944), voluntary enlistment into the Imperial Japanese Army (南の願望, 1944), and Japanese language acquisition by Indonesian children (ニッポン語競技会, 1944).

Local Japanese-sponsored film production (other than newsreels) remained essentially negligible, and the domestic exhibition market was too underdeveloped to be financially viable. However, Nichi'ei's occupation of the Indonesian film industry was a strategic victory over the West, demonstrating that a non-Western Asian nation could displace Hollywood and the Dutch. Indonesia was one of the last areas in the empire to surrender, and many who worked at Nichi'ei stayed on after defeat to work for Indonesian independence from the Dutch.

Korean director Hae Yeong (or Hinatsu Eitaro) migrated to Java from Korea in 1945, where he made the controversial documentary Calling Australia (豪州の呼び声, 1944). Calling Australia was commissioned by the Imperial Japanese Army and depicted Japanese prisoner of war camps in a positive light, showing prisoners feasting on steak and beer, swimming, and playing sports. After the war, the film caused such a stir that the Netherlands Indies Film Unit rushed into production of the counterpoint film Nippon Presents (1945), which used some of the POWs from Calling Australia to reject that film's viewpoint. Two decades later, Australian filmmaker Graham Shirley assembled the remaining survivors to make Prisoners of Propaganda (1987), yet another documentary about how, in his view, both regimes had conspired to exploit the prisoners each for their own purposes. After the war, Hae changed his name to Dr. Huyung, married an Indonesian woman with whom he had two sons, and directed three films before his death in 1952: Between Sky and Earth (1951), Gladis Olah Raga (1951), and Bunga Rumar Makan (1952).

=== After independence ===
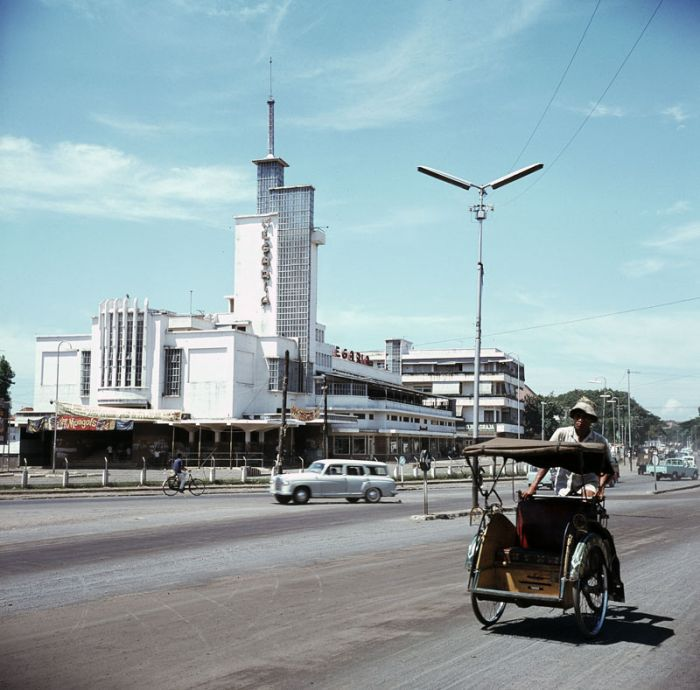
Former cinema Megaria (ca. 1960–80), today Cinema Metropole XXI

After independence, the Sukarno government used the film industry for nationalistic, anti-imperialist purposes and foreign film imports were banned. After the overthrow of Sukarno by Suharto's New Order regime, films were regulated through a censorship code that aimed to maintain the social order and Suharto's grip on society. Usmar Ismail, a director from West Sumatra, made a major impact in Indonesian film in the 1950s and 1960s through his company Perfini. Djamaluddin Malik's Persari Film often emulated American genre films and the working practices of the Hollywood studio system, as well as remaking popular Indian films.

In the late 1950s, a number of political aspects impacted the film industry, not only in production but also in distribution. Threats of burning the movie theaters and film boycotts by anti-imperialist movements meant that the profit for movie theaters dropped drastically. In 1954, a first Indonesian superhero film, Sri Asih, was made. This film was directed by Tan Sing Hwat, and starred Turino Djunaedy and Mimi Mariani as Sri Asih. Around 1964 there were 700 movie theaters in Indonesia, which fell to 350 in 1965. The post-independence era was greatly influenced by the 30 September Movement, which led to a dilemma for local movie theater owners when the local films produced weren't enough to fill the program slot. The economic crash had put the growing industry on hold and paralyzed people's purchasing power; however, at the end of the 1960s, the film industry had survived mostly because of popular foreign imports.

=== 1980s ===
The industry reached its peak in the 1980s, with successful films such as Nagabonar (1987) and Catatan si Boy (1989). Warkop's comedy films, directed by Arizal, also proved to be successful. The industry also found appeal among teens with films such as Pintar-pintar Bodoh (1982) and Maju Kena Mundur Kena (1984). Actors during this era included Deddy Mizwar, Eva Arnaz, Lidya Kandou, Onky Alexander, Meriam Bellina, Rano Karno, and Paramitha Rusady. The film Tjoet Nja' Dhien (1988) won 9 Citra Awards at the 1988 Indonesian Film Festival. It was also the first Indonesian movie chosen for screening at the Cannes Film Festival.

=== 1990s ===
By the 1990s, imports of foreign films resumed, and the quantity of Indonesian films was reduced due to competition, especially from the United States and Hong Kong. The number of movies produced decreased significantly, from 115 in 1990 to 37 in 1993.

In 1992, the Law Number 8 on Film categorized production as a non-obligatory activity and lifted the requirement of production permits. These permits had previously served as a connection between filmmakers and production houses and the government. As a result, data on film production—both commercial and independent—decreased in number and accuracy throughout the 1990s.

Rampant counterfeiting and the increasing popularity of television also contributed to the decline of Indonesian cinema. Multivision Plus (under Raam Punjabi) controlled one of many cinema companies who produced sinetron (soap operas). The majority of films produced were exploitaive, adult-themed B-movies shown in budget cinemas, outdoor screenings, direct-to-video, or on television. In 1996, 33 films were made in Indonesia, the majority of which were filled with adult-themed content. This number continued to decrease significantly; only seven domestic films were made in 1999.

Number of feature films produced in Indonesia from 1926 to 2017

=== 2000s ===
Under the Reform era, independent filmmaking lead to a rebirth of the film industry in Indonesia, where films started addressing previously banned topics such as religion, race, and love.

The number of domestic films made increased from six in 2001 to ten in 2002. It continued to increase significantly as the years passed on. Notable films included Ada Apa Dengan Cinta?, directed by Rudi Soedjarwo in 2002; Eliana Eliana, directed by Riri Riza; and Arisan!, starring Tora Sudiro. 2005 saw the release of Beauty and Warrior, Indonesia's first animated feature film, and Gie, directed by Riri Riza and based on the life of Indonesian activist Soe Hok Gie.

Ayat-Ayat Cinta (2008), directed by Hanung Bramantyo, was notable in that it attracted Muslim audiences like never before in Indonesian film history, thanks to its narrative crossover between Islam and modern romance.

In 2009, Infinite Frameworks released their first full-length animation movie Sing to the Dawn (Meraih Mimpi). The movie itself features some foreigners, but all artists and dubbers were Indonesian, with most of the dubbers being celebrities such as Gita Gutawa, Surya Saputra, and Jajang C. Noer.

=== 2010s ===
From 2010 to 2011, due to the substantial increase in value-added tax (VAT) applied to foreign films, cinemas no longer had access to many foreign films. This has caused a massive ripple effect on the country's economy. It is assumed that this increased the purchasing of unlicensed DVDs. In 2011, the minimum cost to view a foreign film not screened locally was IDR 1,000,000, equivalent to US$100, as it included a plane ticket to Singapore.

The Indonesian film market is in the C, D, and E classes, and due to this, foreign porn stars such as Sasha Grey, Vicky Vette, Maria Ozawa, Sora Aoi, and Rin Sakuragi were invited to play a part in movies. Most locally made movies were low-budget horror films.

Since 2011, locally made films were increasingly critically acclaimed. This was attested by the international release of films such as The Raid (2011) and its 2014 sequel, Modus Anomali (2012), Dilema (2012), Lovely Man (2012), Java Heat (2013), and Pengabdi Setan (2017).

Indonesian horror films, particularly the work of director Joko Anwar, attracted international attention in the 2010s, aided by streaming services. The Queen of Black Magic, Satan's Slaves, and Impetigore have been perceived as part of a new wave of folk horror films from Southeast Asia.

During the decade, Indonesian cinema experienced significant improvements in industry production and distribution compared to previous decades. New associations appeared to support production, and new movie theaters were constructed in areas outside the island of Java.

Domestically, the government's efforts to promote local films with the regulation of Law Number 33 on Film in 2009 had a positive impact on the development of the industry. Article 10 explained that film activities and show business actors must prioritize Indonesian films, and prioritize the use of domestic power sources. Additionally, Article 12 clarifies that actors are prohibited from showing films from only one production house, and imported films are prohibited from exceeding 50% of the showing hours within six consecutive months in order to avoid monopolistic practices or external competition.

Indonesian films increasingly appeared at international festivals. The decade also saw an increase in film collaboration with other countries in distribution and production.

=== 2020s ===
The COVID-19 pandemic in early 2020 paralyzed the domestic and foreign film industry. Indonesia became one of the countries with the highest infection rate in the world in July 2021, with around 44,700 active cases. This forced the government to make an emergency decision to enforce restrictions on community activities (PPKM), namely the restriction of various group activities. As a result, film-making activities were ordered to be closed or temporarily suspended nationally from mid-March 2020. Nationally, 68 cinemas were closed: 387 screens spread across 33 cities and 15 provinces in Indonesia.

Although limited by the obligation to keep distance and work online, Indonesian filmmakers have not stopped writing and making films, and production house entrepreneurs continue working through online platforms. These adaptations paralleled the rise in popularity of online streaming services, and encouraged local industries to improve the quality of their platforms and cooperate with national television channels to avoid the economic crisis caused by the pandemic. Various independent production houses have started to produce their films with independent online platforms such as Vidio and Viddsee.

In this decade, Indonesian films gained attention at international film festivals, where Vengeance Is Mine, All Others Pay Cash directed by Edwin won the Golden Leopard Award from Locarno International Film Festival, Yuni directed by Kamila Andini won the Platform Prize at the Toronto International Film Festival along with Penyalin Cahaya directed by Wregas Bhanuteja and Autobiography debut film from Makbul Mubarak. From Netflix streaming as well, The Big 4 directed by Timo Tjahjanto also received international public recognition by topping the global movie chart for several weeks.

Indonesian films also saw a surge in admissions this decade. In 2022, KKN di Desa Penari became the first local film to reach 10 million admissions. 2024 marked the first post-pandemic year in which local movie dominated the market, with 80.21 million admissions, the most in history, representing 65% of the year's total. Then, the following year, Jumbo surprised the public by becoming the first local animated film to reach 1 million admissions and also surpassed KKN di Desa Penari to become local film with the most admissions in Indonesia.

== Film festivals ==
Asia-wide major film festival Jogja-NETPAC Asian Film Festival has been held in Yogyakarta since 2006. The 2023 edition drew more than 20,000 attendees and screened a total of 205 films from all over Asia. The inaugural edition of Jakarta Film Week was held in 2021, aimed to support the revival of the film industry post the COVID-19 pandemic in Indonesia.

A former major film festival in Indonesia was the Jakarta International Film Festival (JiFFest), held every year in December since 1999. The festival experienced a two-year hiatus in 2011 and 2012, but resumed for its last edition in 2013. Jakarta also hosted film festivals such as the 52nd Asia-Pacific Film Festival (APFF) on 18–22 November 2008.

== National film market ==
=== Movie theaters ===
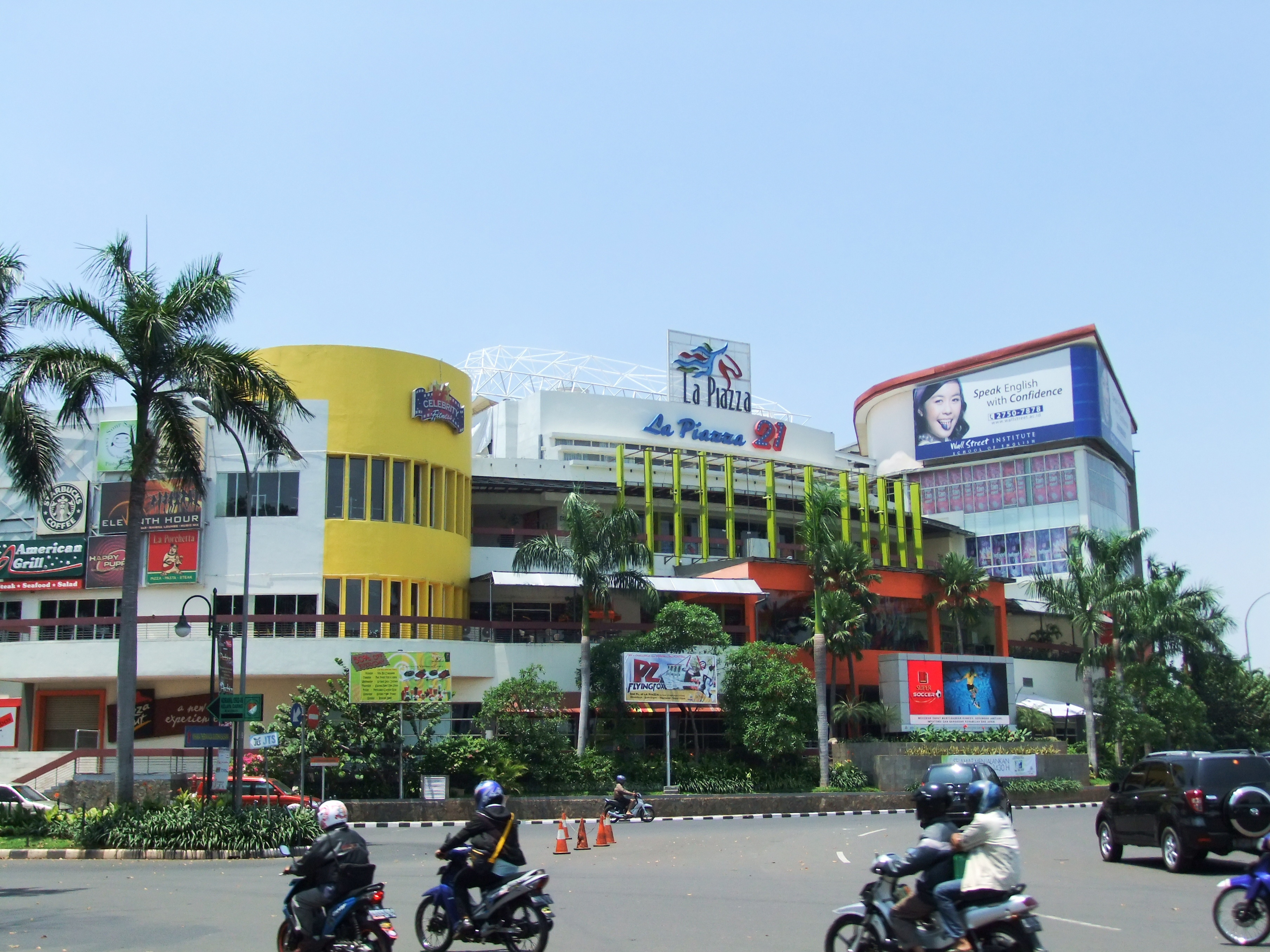
Exterior of La Piazza, which housed La Piazza 21 (later La Piazza XXI) in Jakarta, since closed and as of March 2023 being demolished

Records show that there were movie theatres named as Oriental and Elita during 1926 in Bandung. The earliest cinema hall in Jakarta was the Alhamra Theater at Sawah Besar, which was established in 1931. Other old cinema halls in Jakarta were the Astoria, Grand, Metropole, Rex, Capitol, Rivoli, Central, and Orion.

As of 2025, there were about 2,354 screens in Indonesia. Still far below its peak in the 1980s, which had 6,600 screens.

The largest cinema chain in Indonesia is 21 Cineplex, which has cinemas spread throughout Indonesia and control around 60% of the national total. Founded in 1987, Cinema XXI currently (as of July 2023) operates 1,235 screens across 230 theaters in 71 cities, with a target of reaching 2,000 screens within the next five years. It has three separate brands to target different markets: Cinema 21, Cinema XXI, and The Premiere. Since 2012, Cinema 21 outlets are gradually being renovated to become Cinema XXI.

Another cinema chain is Blitzmegaplex, which opened its first location in 2006 and became the second biggest movie theater in the country. In 2017, the brand name was changed to CGV. As of January 2019, it had opened 57 theaters with 249 screens in 21 cities across Indonesia. The company's Megaplex at Grand Indonesia in Jakarta is dubbed Indonesia's largest cineplex by the MURI (Indonesian Record Museum).

Cinemaxx, launched by Lippo Group, opened its first cinema at The Plaza Semanggi on 17 August 2014. In 2018, Cinemaxx (now Cinépolis) operated 45 cinemas with 203 screens in Indonesia. In 2018, it expected to open 300 cinemas with 2,000 screens spread across 85 cities within the ten years.

In May 2017, Agung Sedayu Group opened FLIX Cinema, with its first outlet at PIK Avenue, North Jakarta. Three months later, it opened its second outlet at Grand Galaxy Park, Bekasi. It plans to open outlets at District 8 Shopping Centre, South Jakarta, and the Mall of Indonesia, North Jakarta (replacing CGV).

Several other cinema chains also operate in certain areas such as New Star Cineplex, KOTA Cinema Mall, Dakota Cinema, Movimax, Golden Theater and some have also expanded abroad such as to Southeast Asia and Timor Leste, such as Platinum Cineplex.

=== Movie-goers ===
In the regulation of the Minister of Education and Culture of the Republic of Indonesia Number 34 of 2019 concerning the Circulation, Performance, Export and Import of Films, Article 17 explains the need for monthly notification of the number of viewers of a film through a data collection system in order to carry out functions in the field of cinema development. This data collection is carried out digitally. For each film entered in national cinemas, including local films and imported films, it includes the audience gains based on show hours and detailed locations. Cinema attendance averages only 0.45 visits per person per year, highlighting untapped growth potential as incomes and cities progress.

Year	Movie-goers
2011	15,565,132
2012	18,887,258
2013	12,716,790
2014	15,657,406
2016	34,088,298
2017	39,135,910
2018	52 million
2019	51.9 million
2020	19 million
2021	4.5 million
2022	54.07 million
2023	55 million
2024	80.21 million

Local film attendance is projected to surpass 100 million by 2026, reflecting an annual growth rate of around ten percent.

Various studies insist on the recent fragmentation of audiences in Indonesia, film theatre audiences being only a part of the totality of film viewers.

== See also ==
- Cinema of Asia
- Cinema of the world
- Culture of Indonesia
- Media of Indonesia
- Southeast Asian cinema
- World cinema

== Works cited ==
- "Albert Balink". Encyclopedia of Jakarta (in Indonesian). Jakarta City Government. Archived from the original on 17 October 2012.
- Biran, Misbach Yusa (2009). Sejarah Film 1900–1950: Bikin Film di Jawa [History of Film 1900–1950: Making Films in Java] (in Indonesian). Jakarta: Komunitas Bamboo working with the Jakarta Art Council. ISBN 978-979-3731-58-2.
- "Foreign Exchange". The New York Times. New York. 8 June 1938. (subscription required)
- Imanjaya, Ekky (2006). A to Z about Indonesian Film (in Indonesian). Bandung: DAR! Mizan : Didistribusikan oleh Mizan Media Utama.
- Kristanto, JB (2005). Katalog Film Indonesia 1926–2005 (in Indonesian). Jakarta: Nalar bekerjasama dengan Fakultas Film dan Televisi, Institut Kesenian Jakarta [dan] Sinematek Indonesia. ISBN 9789799939531.
- "Lily van Java". Encyclopedia of Jakarta (in Indonesian). Jakarta: Jakarta City Government.
- "Tjoet Nja Dhien". Monash University. 21 May 1988.
- Said, Salim (1982). Profil Dunia Film Indonesia [Profile of Indonesian Cinema] (in Indonesian). Jakarta: Grafiti Pers. OCLC 9507803.
- Siapno, Jacqueline Aquino (2006). Gender, Islam, nationalism and the state of Aceh. London: Routledge-Curzon. ISBN 978-0-7007-1513-8.
- Woodrich, Chris (2014). Ekranisasi Awal: Adapting Films to the Silver Screen in the Dutch East Indies (Master of Arts thesis). Gadjah Mada University.
