= List of film producers of the Dutch East Indies =

Twenty-two people are recorded as having produced fictional films in the Dutch East Indies between 1926, when L. Heuveldorp released Loetoeng Kasaroeng, the colony's first domestically produced film, and 1949, when the Dutch formally recognised Indonesia's sovereignty after a four-year revolution, leaving the Dutch East Indies defunct. (Note: The Dutch had occupied the Indies for more than 300 years. Following a three-year Japanese occupation during World War II, Indonesia proclaimed its independence in 1945, an action which was not well-received by the Dutch (Kahin 1952, pp. 29, 101, 136).) Altogether, they are credited for 93 of all known films produced in the Indies, and four of them remained active after independence. All were men; the first female film producer in Indonesia, Ratna Asmara, produced her first film in 1953.

The colony's first producer, Heuveldorp, was of European descent. He was followed in 1928 by the ethnic Chinese businessmen Tjan Tjoen Lian and Liem Goan Lian, who began work on Lily van Java but soon pulled out, to be replaced by David Wong. By 1930 Chinese producers had dominated the industry. The most active of these, The Teng Chun, made his debut in 1931 with Boenga Roos dari Tjikembang; he would go on to produce another 27 films before independence. No native Indonesian film producers are recorded from this period, although several productions were credited only to companies.

Producers in the Indies would often handle multiple roles, such as director and cinematographer. When these positions were filled separately, the producer retained creative control. The Indonesian film historian Misbach Yusa Biran writes that works produced during this time were emphatically commercial, not paying attention to nationalistic or aesthetic values. (Note: Biran (2009, p. 45) cites Usmar Ismail's Darah dan Doa as the first "national" Indonesian film.) However, the film scholars Thomas Barker and Charlotte Setijadi-Dunn suggest that the Chinese-produced films from the Indies offered the possibility of a heterogeneous national identity.

The following list is sorted alphabetically by default, with further sorting capability in certain fields; owing to differing naming conventions between cultures, not all entries are sorted by last name. The list only counts fictional films directed by the subjects and does not include films from other genres or films in which the person held other roles. The names of persons credited with an abbreviated name are written in full, where available.

== Film producers ==
Key
†	Indicates continued activity after 1949

Film producers of the Dutch East Indies
Name	Feature film debut	Debut year	Films produced before 1949	Total films produced	Ref(s).
Ang Hock Liem	Kedok Ketawa	1940	6	6	
Albert Balink	Pareh	1935	1	1	
Ph. Carli	De Stem des Bloeds	1930	3	3	
L. Heuveldorp	Loetoeng Kasaroeng	1926	1	1	
Jo Eng Sek	Si Tjonat	1929	6	6	
Jo Kim Tjan	Poei Sie Giok Pa Loei Tay	1935	6	6	
George Krugers	Karnadi Anemer Bangkong	1930	2	2	
Liem Goan Lian	Lily van Java	1928	1	1	(Note: Film left incompleted)
SI Liem	Djantoeng Hati	1941	1	1	
Tan Boen Soan	Setangan Berloemoer Darah	1928	1	1	
Tan Khoen Yauw	Njai Dasima	1929	15	15	
The Teng Chun †	Boenga Roos dari Tjikembang	1931	28	30	
Tjan Hock Siong	Kris Mataram	1940	2	2	
Tjan Tjoen Lian	Lily van Java	1928	1	1	
Tjho Seng Han	Pantjawarna	1940	2	2	
Touw Ting Iem †	Ikan Doejoeng	1941	3	5	
David Wong	Lily van Java	1928	1	1	(Note: No relation to Nelson, Joshua, or Othniel.)
Joshua Wong	Lari ke Arab	1930	4	4	(Note: Figures for Nelson, Joshua, and Othniel Wong include four films which they produced cooperatively as the Wong brothers.)
Nelson Wong	Si Tjonat	1928	6	6	
Othniel Wong †	Lari ke Arab	1930	4	5	
Fred Young †	Djantoeng Hati	1941	4	21	(Note: Also credited as Utomo)

== Works cited ==
- "Albert Balink | Filmografi" [Albert Balink | Filmography]. filmindonesia.or.id (in Indonesian). Jakarta: Konfiden Foundation. Archived from the original on 16 April 2014.
- "Ang Hock Liem | Filmografi" [Ang Hock Liem | Filmography]. filmindonesia.or.id (in Indonesian). Jakarta: Konfiden Foundation. Archived from the original on 23 April 2014.
- Biran, Misbach Yusa (2009). Sejarah Film 1900–1950: Bikin Film di Jawa [History of Film 1900–1950: Making Films in Java] (in Indonesian). Jakarta: Komunitas Bamboo working with the Jakarta Art Council. ISBN 978-979-3731-58-2.
- "Fred Young | Filmografi" [Fred Young | Filmography]. filmindonesia.or.id (in Indonesian). Jakarta: Konfiden Foundation. Archived from the original on 20 February 2015.
- "G. Krugers | Filmografi" [G. Krugers | Filmography]. filmindonesia.or.id (in Indonesian). Jakarta: Konfiden Foundation. Archived from the original on 16 April 2014.
- "Indische filmkunst" [Indies Cinema]. De Indische Courant (in Dutch). Surabaya. 11 June 1931. p. 5.
- "Jo Kim Tjan | Filmografi" [Jo Kim Tjan | Filmography]. filmindonesia.or.id (in Indonesian). Jakarta: Konfiden Foundation. Archived from the original on 6 March 2016.
- "Joshua Wong | Filmografi" [Joshua Wong | Filmography]. filmindonesia.or.id (in Indonesian). Jakarta: Konfiden Foundation. Archived from the original on 19 February 2014.
- Kahin, George McTurnan (1952). Nationalism and Revolution in Indonesia. Ithaca, New York: Cornell University Press. ISBN 978-0-8014-9108-5.
- "L. Heuveldorp | Filmografi" [L. Heuveldorp | Filmography]. filmindonesia.or.id (in Indonesian). Jakarta: Konfiden Foundation. Archived from the original on 16 April 2014.
- "Liem Goan Lian | Filmografi" [Liem Goan Lian | Filmography]. filmindonesia.or.id (in Indonesian). Jakarta: Konfiden Foundation. Archived from the original on 6 March 2016.
- "Nelson Wong | Filmografi" [Nelson Wong | Filmography]. filmindonesia.or.id (in Indonesian). Jakarta: Konfiden Foundation. Archived from the original on 19 February 2014.
- "Othniel Wong | Filmografi" [Othniel Wong | Filmography]. filmindonesia.or.id (in Indonesian). Jakarta: Konfiden Foundation. Archived from the original on 19 February 2014.
- Said, Salim (1982). Profil Dunia Film Indonesia [Profile of Indonesian Cinema] (in Indonesian). Jakarta: Grafiti Pers. OCLC 9507803.
- Setijadi-Dunn, Charlotte; Barker, Thomas (2011). "Membayangkan 'Indonesia': Produser Etnis Tionghoa dan Sinema Pra-Kemerdekaan" [Imagining 'Indonesia': Ethnic Chinese Producers and Pre-Independence Cinema]. In Cheng, Khoo Gaik; Barker, Thomas; Imanjaya, Ekky (eds.). Mau Dibawa ke Mana Sinema Kita? [Where Will Our Cinema Go?]. Jakarta: Salemba Humanika. ISBN 978-602-8555-38-8.
- "SI Liem | Filmografi" [SI Liem | Filmography]. filmindonesia.or.id (in Indonesian). Jakarta: Konfiden Foundation. Archived from the original on 4 March 2016.
- Swestin, Grace (July 2009). "In the Boys' Club: A Historical Perspective on the Roles of Women in the Indonesian Cinema 1926 – May 1998". Scriptura. 3 (2). Surabaya: Petra Christian University: 103–111. Archived from the original on 16 April 2014.
- "Tan Boen Soan | Filmografi" [Tan Boen Soan | Filmography]. filmindonesia.or.id (in Indonesian). Jakarta: Konfiden Foundation. Archived from the original on 6 March 2016.
- "Tan Koen Yauw | Filmografi" [Tan Koen Yauw | Filmography]. filmindonesia.or.id (in Indonesian). Jakarta: Konfiden Foundation. Archived from the original on 7 March 2016.
- "The Teng Chun | Filmografi" [The Teng Chun | Filmography]. filmindonesia.or.id (in Indonesian). Jakarta: Konfiden Foundation. Archived from the original on 16 April 2014.
- "Tjan Tjoen Lian | Filmografi" [Tjan Tjoen Lian | Filmography]. filmindonesia.or.id (in Indonesian). Jakarta: Konfiden Foundation. Archived from the original on 4 March 2016.
- "Tjan Hock Siong | Filmografi" [Tjan Hock Siong | Filmography]. filmindonesia.or.id (in Indonesian). Jakarta: Konfiden Foundation. Archived from the original on 20 October 2016.
- "Tjho Seng Han | Filmografi" [Tjho Seng Han | Filmography]. filmindonesia.or.id (in Indonesian). Jakarta: Konfiden Foundation. Archived from the original on 4 March 2016.
- "Touw Ting Iem | Filmografi" [Touw Ting Iem | Filmography]. filmindonesia.or.id (in Indonesian). Jakarta: Konfiden Foundation. Archived from the original on 5 March 2016.
- "Wong Bersaudara | Filmografi" [Wong Brothers | Filmography]. filmindonesia.or.id (in Indonesian). Jakarta: Konfiden Foundation. Archived from the original on 16 April 2014.
- "Wu Tsun | Filmografi" [Wu Tsun | Filmography]. filmindonesia.or.id (in Indonesian). Jakarta: Konfiden Foundation. Archived from the original on 16 April 2014.
