= Oh Iboe =

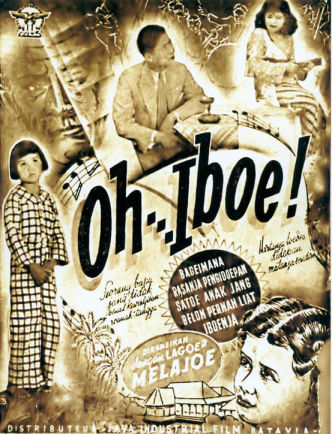
- Theatrical poster
- Directed by: The Teng Chun
- Produced by: The Teng Chun
- Starring: Lo Tjin Nio; Bissu
- Cinematography: The Teng Liong
- Production company: Java Industrial Film
- Release date: c.: 1938 (Dutch East Indies)
- Country: Dutch East Indies (now Indonesia)
- Language: Malay

Oh Iboe (Perfected Spelling: Oh Ibu; literally Oh Mother) is a 1938 film from the Dutch East Indies. Directed by The Teng Chun and starring Lo Tjin Nio and Bissu, it followed a suffering of a family after the matriarch dies. The film was one of several produced by The which dealt with modern stories, following Gadis jang Terdjoeal the year before. It is likely lost.

== Plot ==
Tjoa Kim Liong remarries after the death of his wife; his daughter, Loan, does not like her new step-mother. Tjoa becomes increasingly addicted to gambling, devoting all of his time to the habit. His business is surrendered to his Kian Hwat, who uses this newfound power to steal all of Tjoa's wealth. Years later Loan and her fiancé, Goan Hin, are able to recover the funds.

== Production ==
Oh Iboe was directed and produced by The Teng Chun under his production house Java Industrial Film. Beginning with Sam Pek Eng Tay in 1932 they had directed commercially successful films based on Chinese legends. However, following Albert Balink's Pareh (Rice) in 1936 they began directing works with more modern stories which recognised native interests. Oh Iboe was the second such film, following Gadis jang Terdjoeal (The Sold Girl) in 1937. The's brothers also worked on Oh Iboe: The Teng Liong served as cinematographer, while The Teng Hwi was sound director. It was shot in black-and-white.

The film starred Lo Tjin Nio and Bissu. Bissu, known as a stage actor, made his feature film debut. Oh Iboe was advertised as containing Malay-language songs.

== Release and legacy ==
Oh Iboe was released around 1938. It was advertised with the tagline "What is the life of child who has never seen her mother like?". (Note: Original: "Bageimana rasanja pengidoepan satoe anak jang belon pernah liat iboenja?")

After Ob Iboe The and his Java Industrial Film produced almost twenty further films. Bissu continued to act with Java Industrial Film until the company closed in 1942; beginning with Alang-Alang (Grass) in 1939 he mostly took the role of the antagonist.

Oh Iboe is likely a lost film. The American visual anthropologist Karl G. Heider writes that all Indonesian films from before 1950 are lost. However, JB Kristanto's Katalog Film Indonesia (Indonesian Film Catalogue) records several as having survived at Sinematek Indonesia's archives, and historian Misbach Yusa Biran writes that several Japanese propaganda films have survived at the Netherlands Government Information Service.

== Works cited ==
- Biran, Misbach Yusa (2009). Sejarah Film 1900–1950: Bikin Film di Jawa [History of Film 1900–1950: Making Films in Java] (in Indonesian). Jakarta: Komunitas Bamboo working with the Jakarta Art Council. ISBN 978-979-3731-58-2.
- "Bissu" (in Indonesian). Taman Ismail Marzuki.
- Heider, Karl G (1991). Indonesian Cinema: National Culture on Screen. Honolulu: University of Hawaii Press. ISBN 978-0-8248-1367-3.
- "Kredit Oh Iboe" [Credits for Oh Iboe]. filmindonesia.or.id (in Indonesian). Jakarta: Konfiden Foundation. Archived from the original on 18 October 2016.
- "Media Oh Iboe" [Media for Oh Iboe]. filmindonesia.or.id (in Indonesian). Jakarta: Konfiden Foundation. Archived from the original on 19 October 2016.
- "Oh Iboe". filmindonesia.or.id (in Indonesian). Jakarta: Konfiden Foundation. Archived from the original on 16 October 2013.
