= Java Pacific Film =

Film production company

Java Pacific Film (alternatively, Java Pasific Film) was a short-lived film production company that helped make significant contributions to Indonesian cinema in the 1930s.

== Background ==
During 1934 and early 1935, all feature films released in the Dutch East Indies had been directed by The Teng Chun, based on Chinese mythology or martial arts, and targeted at low-class audiences, generally ethnic Chinese. This situation was created by the Great Depression, which had led to the Dutch East Indies government collecting higher taxes, advertisers asking for more money, and cinemas selling tickets at lower prices; this ensured that there was a very low profit margin for local films. During this period cinemas in the country mainly showed Hollywood productions.

== History ==
Java Pacific Film was founded in 1934 in Bandoeng, in what was then the Dutch East Indies, by Dutch-Indonesian journalist Albert Balink working with the Wong brothers. Balink, who intended to target high-class audiences, had found financial support for the new company, took control, while the Wongs brought a studio and film equipment to the endeavour. The studio, an old tapioca flour factory, featured simple film editing equipment, several buildings to serve as living quarters for the employees, and a veranda surrounded by trees used for editing. The smokestack had the company's initials, JPF, in large letters. Their first production was a documentary about Mount Merapi, entitled De Merapi Dreight (Mount Merapi Looms), in 1934.

Dutch filmmaker Mannus Franken was brought to the country in 1934 to help make the movie Pareh between 1934 and 1936. Franken had previously had success with documentary filmmaking in the Netherlands. The production cost 75,000 gulden, with its star Rd. Mochtar receiving 250 gulden monthly. A commercial flop which bankrupted the producers and company, Pareh is credited with shifting the focus of Indonesian cinema from Chinese productions and subject matter to a more local industry. The film is also praised for its cinematic quality. and its audio.

== Successor ==
Balink collected funds from numerous sponsors and established the Dutch Indies Film Syndicate (Algemeen Nederlandsch Indisch Filmsyndicaat, or ANIF) in late 1936. This government-owned company involved all major figures from JPF. Working mostly on newsreels and documentaries, in 1937 it produced the commercial success Terang Boelan. In 1938 it released Franken's documentary Tanah Sabrang and in 1940 closed.

== Bibliography ==
- Biran, Misbach Yusa (2009). Sejarah Film 1900–1950: Bikin Film di Jawa [History of Film 1900–1950: Making Films in Java] (in Indonesian). Komunitas Bamboo working with the Jakarta Art Council. ISBN 978-979-3731-58-2.
