= Sam Pek Eng Tay =

1931 film

Sam Pek Eng Tay 山伯英台
- Directed by: The Teng Chun
- Written by: The Teng Chun
- Produced by: The Teng Chun
- Cinematography: The Teng Chun
- Production company: Cino Motion Pictures
- Release date: 1931 (Dutch East Indies)
- Countries: Dutch East Indies (now Indonesia)
- Languages: Malay, Mandarin

Sam Pek Eng Tay (Chinese: 山伯英台; Pe̍h-ōe-jī: San-pek Eng-tâi) is a 1931 film directed and produced by The Teng Chun and released in the Dutch East Indies (now Indonesia). It is based on the Chinese legend The Butterfly Lovers, which follows the doomed love between a rich girl and a commoner boy. The film was a commercial success, inspiring The Teng Chun to direct several further films based on Chinese mythology. The name derives from the given names of the legend's two main characters, Liang Shanbo (Nio Sam Pek) (梁山伯) and Zhu Yingtai (Giok Eng Tay) (祝英台).

== Plot ==
Giok Eng Tay, the daughter of a rich man, falls in love with Nio Sam Pek, the son of a commoner. To ensure their family's well-being, Eng Tay's father insists that she marry Ma Bun Cai (Ma Wencai (马文才)), the son of a regent. To ensure that this wish is fulfilled, Eng Tay is locked in her room while her father sends men to attack Sam Pek, who later dies of his wounds. After her marriage is arranged, Giok Eng Tay and her procession pass by Sam Pek's grave. A rain storm suddenly develops and Sam Pek's grave splits open; Eng Tay, wanting to be with her lover, runs to the grave and throws herself into it. The grave then closes and the storm dissipates.

== Production ==
Sam Pek Eng Tay was directed and produced by The Teng Chun, the son of a Chinese-Indonesian merchant who had studied film in Los Angeles, US. He had made his directorial debut shortly before producing Sam Pek Eng Tay, with Boenga Roos dari Tjikembang (The Rose of Cikembang). This film, a moderate success, gave him enough funds to improve his camera equipment: Boenga Roos dari Tjikembang had been criticised for its poor sound. However, unlike the earlier film – which was based on a best-selling novel by Kwee Tek Hoay – Sam Pek Eng Tay was based on a Chinese legend, that of The Butterfly Lovers which was popular as a stage play at the time. The story was adapted for a Dutch East Indies setting. The film's cast is unrecorded.

== Release and reception ==
Sam Pek Eng Tay was released in 1931 by The Teng Chun's Cino Motion Picture to commercial success, mostly targeting ethnic Chinese audiences. The Teng Chun would go on to release numerous films based on Chinese legends, including Pat Bie To (Eight Beautiful Women; 1932), Pat Kiam Hiap (Eight Swordsmen; 1933), and Ouw Peh Tjoa (White and Black Snake; 1934). These later films, emphasising silat, were generally profitable, and allowed The Teng Chun to dominate the industry until after the release of Albert Balink's Terang Boelan (Full Moon) in 1937.

The film is likely lost. The American visual anthropologist Karl G. Heider writes that all Indonesian films from before 1950 are lost. However, JB Kristanto's Katalog Film Indonesia (Indonesian Film Catalogue) records several as having survived at Sinematek Indonesia's archives, and Biran writes that several Japanese propaganda films have survived at the Netherlands Government Information Service.

== Works cited ==
- Biran, Misbach Yusa (2009). Sejarah Film 1900–1950: Bikin Film di Jawa [History of Film 1900–1950: Making Films in Java] (in Indonesian). Jakarta: Komunitas Bamboo working with the Jakarta Art Council. ISBN 978-979-3731-58-2.
- "Boenga Roos dari Tjikembang". filmindonesia.or.id (in Indonesian). Jakarta: Konfidan Foundation. Archived from the original on 2 December 2013.
- Heider, Karl G (1991). Indonesian Cinema: National Culture on Screen. Honolulu: University of Hawaii Press. ISBN 978-0-8248-1367-3.
- Hutari, Fandy (5 November 2011). "Sejarah Awal Industri Film di Hindia Belanda" [Early History of Films in the Dutch East Indies]. Jakarta Beat (in Indonesian). Jakarta. Archived from the original on 28 September 2013.
- "Sam Pek Eng Tay". filmindonesia.or.id (in Indonesian). Jakarta: Konfidan Foundation. Archived from the original on 2 December 2013.
- "The Teng Chun". filmindonesia.or.id (in Indonesian). Jakarta: Konfidan Foundation. Archived from the original on 19 July 2014.
