= Mannus Franken =

Dutch filmmaker (1899–1953)

- Promotional portrait
- Born: 6 February 1899; Deventer, Netherlands
- Died: 1 August 1953 (aged 54); Lochem, Netherlands
- Occupation: Filmmaker
- Years active: 1920s–1953
- Notable work: Regen; Pareh
- Style: Avant-garde

Mannus Franken (6 February 1899 – 1 August 1953) was a Dutch filmmaker who played an important role in the development of Indonesian cinema. He made his debut as a writer before working with Joris Ivens in producing two documentary films. In 1934 he was called to the Dutch East Indies by Albert Balink to help with the production of Pareh (1936). Franken stayed in the Indies until before World War II, making newsreels. After the war he returned to the country and continued this work. In 1949 Franken returned to the Netherlands, where he made another film before his death.

== Biography ==
Franken was born on 2 February 1899 in Deventer, the Netherlands. As a youth he worked as a writer-cum-director before moving to Paris in 1925; in Paris he wrote on the experimental films being produced in France, and in 1928 he directed the stageplay D 16 Mensch en Machine (D 16 Man and Machine), based on the story "Donogoo Tonka" by Jules Romains.

Regen (1929)

The following year, working with Joris Ivens, Franken directed the shorts Regen (Rain) and Branding. Around this time he made another short, entitled Jardin du Luxembourg (Garden of Luxembourg), and during the early 1930s he directed several other films. Also in the early 1930s he was active in the Netherlands as a member of the Filmliga, a Dutch cinema club (1927–1933) founded by Menno ter Braak and Henrik Scholte, and as the chairman of the Association for Educational and Development Films; with the Amsterdam Liga he ran the De Uitkijk Theatre.

Franken, with Dutch-Indonesian journalist and filmmaker Albert Balink and the ethnic Chinese Wong brothers, started the production company Java Pacific Film in the 1930s in what was then the Dutch East Indies, which produced Pareh (1936), an ethnographic film considered a forerunner for the "Indonesia Indah" films. Balink had brought Franken to the country to ensure its artistic quality. Franken helped with the cinematography and screenwriting and, for greater commercial viability, was given top billing. However, the film was a commercial flop and bankrupted its producers, including Franken.

While making these feature films he also worked with the Dutch Indies Film Syndicate (Algemeen Nederlandsch Indisch Filmsyndicaat, or ANIF), owned by Balink, and directed newsreels. During this time Franken may have been involved in the production of Terang Boelan, a feature film directed by Balink. The Indonesian historian Misbach Yusa Biran writes that Franken was not involved as Terang Boelan involved less ethnographic work, while the American film scholar Karl G. Heider writes that Franken co-directed the film. In 1938 Franken directed the semi-documentary film Tanah Sabrang, based on the writings of Adrian Jonkers and promoting emigration from Java to Sumatra. By the time World War II broke out Franken was already in the Netherlands; ANIF had closed in 1940.

After the war, Franken returned to the Indies – since proclaimed an independent nation named Indonesia – to make films for the Netherlands Government Information Service (Rijksvoorlichtingsdienst). Franken returned to the Netherlands in 1949, producing a film for the government. He died on 1 August 1953 in Lochem.

== Legacy ==
On Franken's death, an obituary in De Telegraaf stated that he was a pioneering documentary filmmaker for the Netherlands and one of the country's few avant-garde creative professionals. The film historian Peter Cowie writes that Franken was underrated and "a true pioneer and a very real pillar of the documentary achievement usually credited solely to Joris Ivens". Heider considers Pareh and Terang Boelan the two most important cinematic works from the Dutch East Indies during the 1930s.

The Mannus Franken Foundation, which aims to preserve Franken's legacy, was established in 1979.

== Films produced ==
- Jardins du Luxembourg (Gardens of Luxembourg)
- Regen (Rain; 1929)
- Branding (Surf; 1929)
- Pareh (Rice; 1936)
- Terang Boelan (Full Moon; 1937; uncertain)
- Tanah Sabrang (1938)

== Bibliography ==
- Biran, Misbach Yusa (2009). Sejarah Film 1900–1950: Bikin Film di Jawa [History of Film 1900–1950: Making Films in Java] (in Indonesian). Komunitas Bamboo working with the Jakarta Art Council. ISBN 978-979-3731-58-2.
