= Si Pitoeng (film) =

1931 film

- Directed by: Wong brothers
- Produced by: Wong brothers
- Starring: Herman Shim; Ining Resmini; Zorro
- Production company: Halimoen Film
- Release date: 1931 (Dutch East Indies)
- Country: Dutch East Indies

Si Pitoeng is a film from the Dutch East Indies (modern-day Indonesia) that was released in 1931. Directed by the Wong brothers and starring Herman Shim and Ining Resmini, it was the first film based on the life of Si Pitung, a bandit from Batavia (modern-day Jakarta).

== Background ==
The historical Si Pitung was a 19th-century bandit in Batavia, Dutch East Indies (modern-day Jakarta, Indonesia). He began his criminal career in 1892 by robbing Hadji Sapiudin, a wealthy landowner who lived northeast of Batavia. He then continued stealing, although some tellings have him only stealing from people who collaborated with the Dutch colonial government. He was eventually caught in an ambush and killed by the police officer A.W.V. Hinne and several assistants. Later folklore led to him becoming an Indonesian Robin Hood, stealing from the rich to give to the poor, and attributed mystical powers.

== Plot ==
Pitoeng (Herman Shim) is a Muslim bandit of Betawi descent. He steals from the rich citizens while dealing with a love interest (Ining Resmini) and police officer (Zorro).

== Production ==
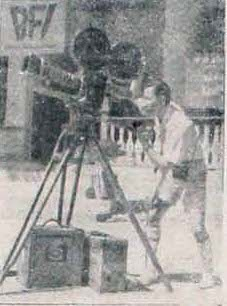
One of the Wong Brothers

Si Pitoeng was produced by Halimoen Film. The Indonesian film historian Misbach Yusa Biran suggests that the theme was chosen by the film's financiers. Si Pitoeng was the first film about Pitung. The kroncong singer Ining Resmini, who had previously acted in Rampok Preanger (1929), was cast as Pitoeng's love interest, while the peranakan Chinese actor Herman Shim was cast as Pitoeng. Filming was completed in Bojong Loa, Bandung.

The film was directed by the Wong brothers, who had studied film in the United States. The brothers' influence led to the film, despite being based on an Indonesian bandit, coming across as an American film; some viewers described it as a sort of Western. The brothers had been directing films since Lily van Java (Lily of Java) in 1927 and generally dealt with Chinese-Indonesian themes.

== Release and reception ==
Si Pitoeng was released by 6 February 1931, although little is known about its box office performance. Another film about the bandit, also entitled Si Pitung, was released in 1970 and was the best performing Indonesian film of the year; this later production had three sequels.

== See also ==
- List of films of the Dutch East Indies
