= Seeing Anthropology =

Book by Karl G. Heider

Seeing Anthropology: Cultural Anthropology Through Film
- First edition
- Author: Karl G. Heider
- Language: English
- Subject: anthropology, cultural anthropology, ethnographic film, area studies, ethnic studies
- Genre: Nonfiction
- Published: 1997 1st ed; 2001 2nd ed; 2004 3rd ed; 2007 4th ed
- Publication place: United States
- Media type: Print, VHS, DVD
- Pages: 480+
- ISBN: 0205512666
- OCLC: 67945533
- Dewey Decimal: 306
- LC Class: GN347 H46 2007

Seeing Anthropology: Cultural Anthropology Through Film by Karl G. Heider introduces cultural anthropology with the use of both text and audiovisual media. First published in 1997, the work uses the tools of the ethnographic film discipline to inform its audience of the various cultural anthropology topics. Also, the text covers 14 different cultures in 17 chapters, which are also represented in 21 different short film clips ranging from two to twelve minutes.
