= Setangan Berloemoer Darah =

1927 novel by Tjoe Hong Bok

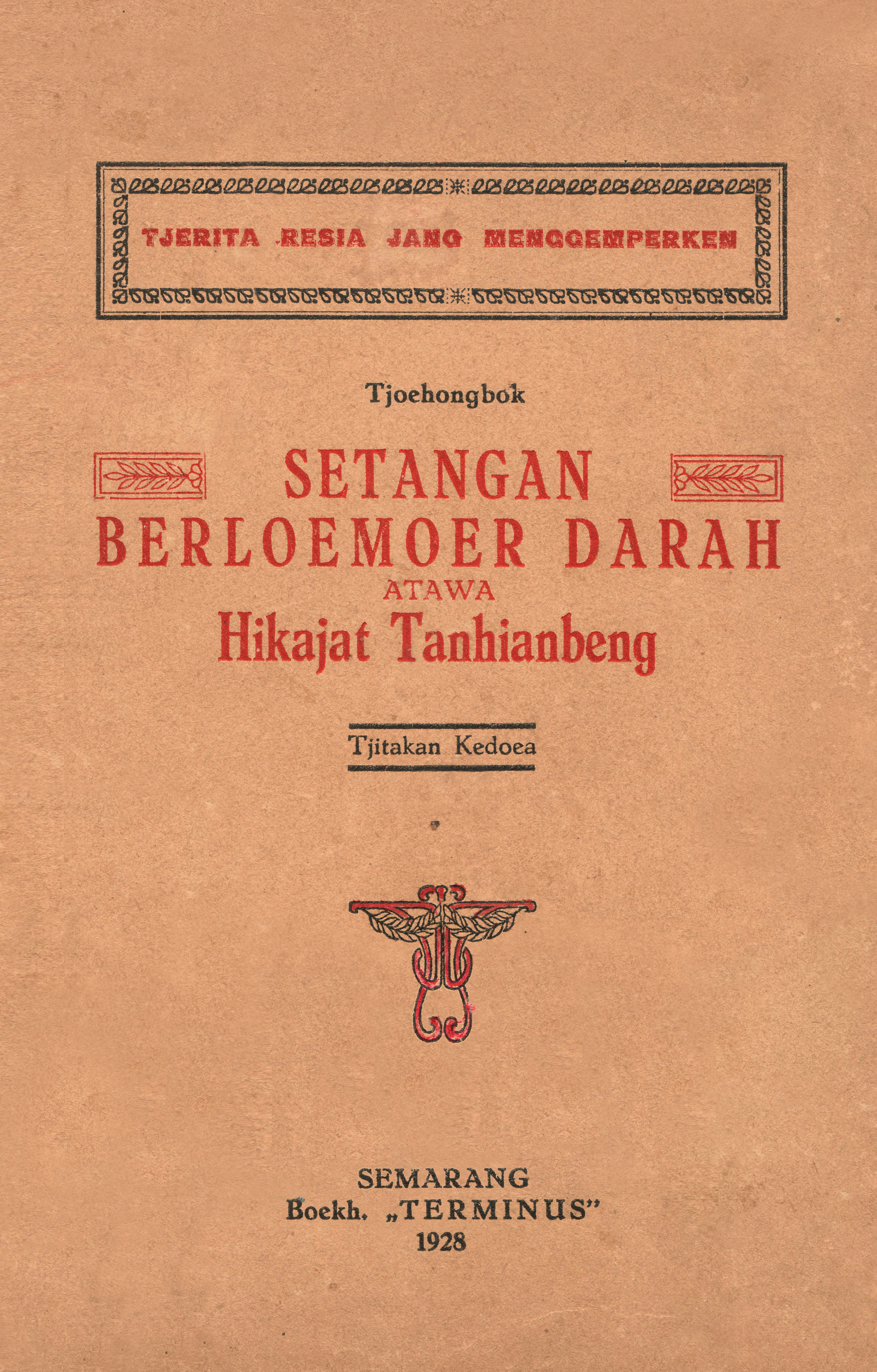
- Author: Tjoe Hong Bok
- Language: Vernacular Malay
- Published: 1927
- Publication place: Dutch East Indies

Setangan Berloemoer Darah (Perfected Spelling: Setangan Berlumur Darah; Indonesian for A Handkerchief Covered in Blood) is a 1927 Chinese Malay novel by Tjoe Hong Bok published in Semarang, Dutch East Indies. It tells of a young man who goes to seek revenge for his father's murder, before ultimately forgiving the killer. A film version was produced in 1928 by Tan Boen Soan.

== Plot ==
After his father is murdered, Tan Hian Beng is forced to leave for Batavia. When he is an adult, he is given a blood-covered handkerchief and told that he must take revenge on his father's killer. He leaves for Semarang, and along the way rescues sisters Lim Kiat Nio and Lim Liang Tin from a group of bandits under the command of Li Djin Hin. Once in Semarang, Tan becomes assistant to the letnan Cina Goei Tjeng Tin. Through his relationship with Goei, Tan is reunited with his mother and learns of a young man named Kam Po Sin, who has killed a woman.

In an attempt to stop the investigation, Kam Po Sin joins forces with Li; the two kidnap Lim Kiat Nio and capture Tan and Goei, but try to kill each other after Kiat Nio escapes. Kam Po Sin emerges victorious, but is caught and sentenced to death. On the day of the execution, Tan passes by Kam Po Sin's house. Hearing the sound of weeping, he investigates, and finds Kam Po's father Tiok Tjoen, who killed Tan's father. Kam Tiok Tjoen is shocked at Tan's appearance, believing him to be the ghost of the murdered man. Tan, for his part, decides that Kam Tiok Tjoen need not be killed, for he has already suffered enough.

== Writing and publication ==
Setangan Berloemoer Darah was written by Tjoe Hong Bok. In his preface to the novel, Tjoe wrote that it was based on a series of letters he had been given which detailed true events in the 18th and 19th centuries; according to Tjoe, he merely changed the names of the individuals involved and the location where the events took place. As such, the critic of Chinese Malay literature Nio Joe Lan classifies Setangan Berloemoer Darah as a historical novel. Chris Woodrich of Gadjah Mada University questions this, however, noting that it was common for Chinese Malay novels to claim to be based on a true story despite being entirely fictitious.

The novel was published in Semarang, Dutch East Indies, in 1927. By 1930, copies were being sold in Singapore, part of the Straits Settlements.

== Film ==
A film adaptation of the novel was produced by Tan Boen Soan, a journalist who had worked for several newspapers in Batavia; this was the second domestic adaptation of a novel, following G. Krugers' Eulis Atjih in 1927. Little is recorded of this production, including the cast and box-office returns. It is known, however, to have been a silent film in black-and-white. The film (as with most productions in the Dutch East Indies) is thought to be lost.

As with the earlier film Lily van Java (1928), the film version of Setangan Berloemoer Darah was directed at ethnic Chinese audiences, and like the earlier work it was produced by ethnic Chinese businessmen who were capitalising on the success of films produced in Shanghai, China. Beginning in 1929, with the release of Rampok Preanger and Si Tjonat, the use of martial arts became common in domestic productions through a series of bandit films.

== Works cited ==
- Biran, Misbach Yusa (2009). Sejarah Film 1900–1950: Bikin Film di Jawa [History of Film 1900–1950: Making Films in Java] (in Indonesian). Jakarta: Komunitas Bamboo working with the Jakarta Art Council. ISBN 978-979-3731-58-2.
- "New Malay Romanised Story Books". Malayan Saturday Post. Singapore. 22 November 1930. p. 26.
- Nio, Joe Lan (1962). Sastera Indonesia-Tionghoa [Indonesian-Chinese Literature] (in Indonesian). Jakarta: Gunung Agung. OCLC 3094508.
- "Setangan Berloemoer Darah". filmindonesia.or.id (in Indonesian). Jakarta: Konfiden Foundation. Archived from the original on 17 May 2014.
- Woodrich, Chris (2014). Ekranisasi Awal: Adapting Films to the Silver Screen in the Dutch East Indies (Master of Arts thesis). Gadjah Mada University.
