= Tio Tek Djien =

- Born: 2 December 1895; Nganjuk, East Java, Dutch East Indies
- Died: 17 December 1975 (aged 80); Jakarta, Indonesia
- Occupations: Playwright, film producer
- Spouse: Miss Riboet

Tio Tek Djien (Chinese: 赵德真; pinyin: Zhào Dézhēn; Pe̍h-ōe-jī: Tiō Tek-chin, also Djin; 2 December 1895 – 17 December 1975), also styled T. D. Tio, Jr., was a Chinese Indonesian stage manager and playwright turned film producer.

== Early life and Miss Riboet's Orion ==
Tio Tek Djien was born in Nganjuk, East Java, on 2 December 1895. The son of a rich ethnic Chinese family, he was well-educated for the time, graduating from a senior high school with a focus on economics. When attending a theatrical performance at Taman Hiburan Orion in Pekalongan, owned by his parents, Tio fell in love with the troupe's star, Miss Riboet. When the troupe left Pekalongan, Tio joined them. He and Miss Riboet later married, and Tio found some work as a reporter.

In 1925, Tio established his own theatrical troupe, casting Riboet as the star. This troupe, originally titled the Orion Opera but later known as Miss Riboet's Orion, often performed works written by Tio; Njoo Cheong Seng eventually took over most of Tio's writing duties, leaving the owner to handle managerial duties. With a keen eye for marketing, caused in part by his earlier ventures at journalism, in 1927 Tio asked one of his employees, Nelson Wong, to make a film starring Riboet. This project was ultimately scrapped after Tio decided she was not photogenic. Though he did not complete a film during this time, Indonesian film historian Misbach Yusa Biran credits Tio with spurring the interest of ethnic Chinese businessmen in the local film industry.

Though Tio and his Orion challenged the traditionally popular forms of theatre with their Europeanized aspects, including plays featuring everyday issues, they were not the only active troupe. In 1926 Willy Piedro and his wife Dewi Dja established Dardanella, and by 1931 the competition from Dardanella had led to an advertising war between the two troupes, each focusing on their best-received works: Gagak Solo from Orion and Dr Samsi from Dardanella. Ultimately Orion was unable to compete and had lost much of its popularity by the late 1930s. During the Japanese occupation (1942–45) and subsequent Indonesian National Revolution (1945–49), Orion was disbanded. In 1950 Tio attempted to reunite the cast, but was unsuccessful.

== Later career ==
Unable to reunite Orion, Tio instead turned to the burgeoning post-Revolution Indonesian film industry. He made his feature film debut as executive producer of Topeng Besi in 1953, followed by Machluk Raksasa. In 1954 he directed and produced Melarat tapi Sehat, based on a stage play he had written while with Orion. Riboet died in 1965, leaving Tio a widower.

Tio spent his last years as a landlord, surviving on the income from a number of rental homes. Biran, in his memoirs, recalls that Tio was greatly distraught by the low quality of films in the 1970s, as well as the increasingly poor state of the national theatre. In 1975 Tio received an award from Governor of Jakarta Ali Sadikin for his contributions to Indonesian's film industry. He died four months later, on 17 December 1975.

== Works cited ==
- Biran, Misbach Yusa, ed. (1979). Apa Siapa Orang Film Indonesia 1926–1978 [What and Who: Film Figures in Indonesia, 1926–1978]. Sinematek Indonesia. OCLC 6655859.
- Biran, Misbach Yusa (2008). Kenang-kenangan Orang Bandel [Memories of a Recalcitrant Man] (in Indonesian). Komunitas Bamboo. ISBN 978-979-3731-43-8.
- Biran, Misbach Yusa (2009). Sejarah Film 1900-1950: Bikin Film di Jawa [History of Film 1900-1950: Making Films in Java] (in Indonesian). Komunitas Bamboo working with the Jakarta Art Council. ISBN 978-979-3731-58-2.
- Cohen, Matthew Isaac (2007). "Riboet, Miss (1900?–1965)". In Leiter, Samuel L. (ed.). Encyclopedia of Asian Theatre: O-Z. Westport: Greenwood Press. pp. 161–62. ISBN 978-0-313-33531-0.
- Sumardjo, Jakob (1992). Perkembangan Teater Modern dan Sastra Drama Indonesia [Development of Modern Theatre and Indonesian Literary Dramas] (in Indonesian). Bandung: Citra Aditya Bakti. ISBN 978-979-414-615-6.
