= Terang Boelan =

1937 film from the Dutch East Indies

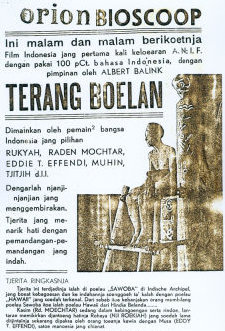
- Theatrical poster, Batavia
- Directed by: Albert Balink
- Screenplay by: Saeroen
- Starring: Rd Mochtar; Roekiah; Eddie T. Effendi; Kartolo
- Cinematography: Joshua Wong; Othniel Wong
- Music by: Ismail Marzuki
- Production company: Algemeen Nederlandsch Indisch Filmsyndicaat
- Release date: 8 December 1937
- Countries: Dutch East Indies (now Indonesia)
- Language: Malay Indonesian

Terang Boelan (Indonesian pronunciation: [t̪əˌraŋ ˈbulan]; Indonesian for "Full Moon", Terang Bulan in the Enhanced Spelling System) is a 1937 (Note: Some sources, such as Anwar (2004, p. 84), incorrectly give the film's release year as 1938.) film from the Dutch East Indies (now Indonesia). Written by Saeroen, directed by Albert Balink, and starring Rd Mochtar, Roekiah and Eddie T. Effendi, Terang Boelan follows two lovers who elope after one is almost forced to marry an opium smuggler. The film was shot in the Indies and Singapore, and was partially inspired by the 1936 Hollywood film The Jungle Princess. It was aimed at native audiences and included keroncong music, which was popular at the time, and several actors from Balink's previous work Pareh (1936).

Terang Boelan was a commercial success in both the Indies and abroad, earning 200,000 Straits dollars in British Malaya. This success revived the faltering domestic film industry and inspired films aimed at Malay audiences in Malaya, creating a formula of songs, beautiful scenery and romance that was followed for decades afterwards. The Indonesian film historian Misbach Yusa Biran described it as a turning point in the history of Indonesian cinema for its catalytic effect on the industry's growth. Like many Indonesian films of the era, Terang Boelan has been lost since at least the 1970s.

== Plot ==
Rohaya must separate from her lover, Kasim, so that she can marry her father's choice, the disreputable but rich Musa. The night before the wedding, Kasim plays the song "Terang Boelan" for Rohaya, and they agree to elope. The following day, Rohaya and Kasim escape from Sawoba Island to Malacca, where Kasim begins work at a drydock and Rohaya keeps busy as a housewife. They discover that Kasim's old friend Dullah has lived in Malacca for some time.

Their life together is interrupted when Musa, who is revealed to be an opium dealer, discovers them. While Kasim is away at work, Rohaya's father comes and takes her back to Sawoba. Kasim, having discovered Musa's deeds, also returns to Sawoba and rallies the villagers to his side by telling them of Musa's opium dealings. He and Musa begin fighting. When it appears Kasim may lose, he is saved by Dullah, who had followed him back to Sawoba. The villagers and Rohaya's father agree that Kasim and Rohaya should be together, as they are truly in love. (Note: Plot summary derived from Said (1982, pp. 24–26) and Biran (2009, pp. 169–170).)

== Cast ==
- Roekiah as Rohaya
- Rd Mochtar as Kasim
- Kartolo as Dullah
- Eddie T. Effendi as Musa
- Muhin as Rohaya's Father
- Roldiah Matulessy

== Background ==
During 1934 and early 1935, all feature films released in the Dutch East Indies had been made by the American-educated Chinese-Indonesian director The Teng Chun. His low budget but popular films were mainly inspired by Chinese mythology or martial arts, and although aimed at ethnic Chinese proved popular among native audiences because of their action sequences. The Teng Chun's dominance was an effect of the Great Depression and changing market trends. The Great Depression had led to the Dutch East Indies government collecting higher taxes and cinemas selling tickets at lower prices, ensuring that there was a very low profit margin for local films. As a result, cinemas in the colony mainly showed Hollywood productions, while the domestic industry decayed. The Teng Chun was able to continue his work only because his films often played to full theatres.

In an attempt to show that locally produced, well-made films could be profitable, the Dutch journalist Albert Balink, who had no formal film experience, produced Pareh (Rice) in 1935 in collaboration with the ethnic Chinese Wong brothers (Othniel and Joshua), and the Dutch documentary filmmaker Mannus Franken. The film cost 20 times as much as an average local production, in part because of Balink's perfectionism, and was ultimately a failure. The Indonesian writer and cultural critic Armijn Pane wrote that Pareh had performed poorly with native audiences as it was seen as looking at them through European eyes. Pareh bankrupted its producers, and enabled The Teng Chun to dominate the industry – although with less traditional stories – for a further two years.

== Production ==
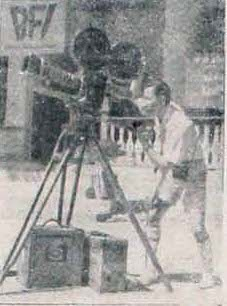
One of the Wong brothers, c. 1947; the Wongs' collaboration with Balink on Terang Boelan was their second, after Pareh.

By late 1936 Balink had obtained financial backing from several domestic and foreign companies with which he, the Wongs, and Franken opened the Dutch Indies Film Syndicate (Algemeen Nederlandsch Indisch Filmsyndicaat, or ANIF) in Batavia (now Jakarta). Although this new establishment focused mainly on newsreels and documentaries, on 1 January 1937 ANIF announced that it would produce several feature films, one of which was Terang Boelan.

The story for Terang Boelan was written by Saeroen, a reporter with the newspaper Pemandangan who had close connections to the theatrical community, shortly after the domestic release of the American-produced Dorothy Lamour vehicle The Jungle Princess (1936), which served as an inspiration. The Indonesian film historian Misbach Yusa Biran wrote that this gave Terang Boelan stylistic and thematic similarities to the earlier film. The Indonesian film critic Salim Said also recognised such similarities, describing Terang Boelan as reflecting the "jungle princess" works popular at the time. Saeroen named the fictional island on which Terang Boelan takes place "Sawoba" after the crew: Saeroen, Wong, and Balink.

Production had begun by February 1937, under Balink's direction and with the Wongs as cinematographers, only to be interrupted by the relocation of ANIF's offices. Filming had begun by May of that year. Sources conflict as to whether Franken was involved: Biran wrote that Franken had been left in charge of the studio's documentaries, while the American film scholar Karl G. Heider recorded Franken as co-directing the film. As opposed to The Teng Chun, who aimed his films at lower-class audiences, Balink aimed his film at educated native Indonesians, attempting to show them not from a European perspective but as they viewed themselves. According to Said, this arose as a reaction to Pareh's failure and resulted in a less ethnological approach. Terang Boelan was shot in black-and-white using highly flammable nitrate film at Cilincing in Batavia, Merak Beach in Banten, and Tanjong Katong in Singapore. The use of nitrate film may have been a factor in the film's later loss.

The cast of Terang Boelan mainly consisted of actors who had appeared in Pareh. This included the leading actor, Rd Mochtar, and several minor players, including Eddie T. Effendi and Soekarsih. Other cast members, including the leading lady Roekiah and her husband Kartolo, were drawn from traditional toneel theatrical troupes; this may have been part of an effort to attract theatregoers. The film, which included the songs "Terang Boelan" and "Boenga Mawar" ("Rose"), required its cast to sing keroncong music (traditional music with Portuguese influences); because Mochtar's voice was ill-suited to the task, the musician Ismail Marzuki – who also composed the film's score – sang while Mochtar lip synced.

== Release and reception ==
Terang Boelan premiered on 8 December 1937 at the Rex Theatre in Batavia, the capital of the Dutch East Indies; it played to a nearly full theatre. Also marketed under the Dutch title Het Eilan der Droomen, the film was advertised as showing that the Indies were as beautiful as Hawaii, a popular island paradise in Hollywood films. Posters also emphasised the use of Indonesian-language dialogue. William van der Heide, a lecturer on film studies at the University of Newcastle in Australia, notes that the film continued a trend of "Indonesianisation", or the application of a national (Indonesian) understanding to borrowed concepts; for Terang Boelan this indigenisation process involved the inclusion of "exotic local settings" and keroncong music. Such adaptations of foreign films had arisen several years earlier and continued long after Terang Boelan's release.

The film was a commercial success, both in the Indies and nearby British Malaya. Native audiences filled the cinemas, most of them working-class people, including native fans of toneel and keroncong who rarely watched films. After being licensed by RKO Radio Pictures, the film was screened in British Malaya, where it was advertised as "the first and best Malay musical" and earned 200,000 Straits dollars (then equivalent to US$ 114,470) in two months. Terang Boelan proved to be the most successful production in the area until Krisis (Crisis) in 1953, released after the Netherlands recognised Indonesia's independence in 1949.

Despite the success, ANIF was displeased with the film and halted its other non-documentary productions; one of the studio's cameramen, an Indo man named J.J.W. Steffens, (Note: Biran does not indicate his full name.) suggested that ANIF's management preferred works of non-fiction as a more intellectual medium. Disappointed by the company's reaction, Balink left the Indies and emigrated to the United States in March 1938. Terang Boelan's cast left ANIF not long afterwards and, after briefly touring Malaya, joined Tan's Film. They made their first film for Tan's, Fatima, in 1938. Mochtar, who soon married fellow Terang Boelan actress Soekarsih, continued to be cast as Roekiah's lover; the two were a popular screen couple until Mochtar left Tan's in 1940 over a wage dispute.

== Legacy ==
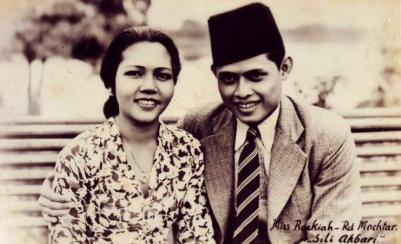
Roekiah and Rd Mochtar (pictured in Siti Akbari) continued to be cast as lovers until 1940.

The success of Terang Boelan led to an increase in film production in the colony, many of the films following the same formula, including songs, beautiful scenery and romance. Before Terang Boelan, local studios had generally been unsuccessful in finding a formula popular with audiences, but the triple successes of Terang Boelan, Fatima, and Alang-Alang (Grass, 1939) revived the industry. Four new production houses were established in 1940, and actors and actresses previously attached to theatrical troupes entered the film industry, which was reaching new audiences. Most locally produced films released in the Indies were made between 1939 and the Japanese occupation in 1942. Meanwhile, in Malaya, the brothers Run Run and Runme Shaw, drawing inspiration from Terang Boelan and Alang-Alang's success with Malay audiences, established Malay Film Productions in Singapore, where it became one of the more successful production houses.

Heider considered Terang Boelan one of the two most important cinematic works from the Dutch East Indies during the 1930s; Balink's earlier film Pareh was the other. He notes that Terang Boelan "set the tone for popular Indonesian cinema", a tone that remained dominant into the 1990s. Biran considered the film a turning point in the history of Indonesian cinema, showing the possibilities of the medium and serving as a catalyst for further development. Said concurred, describing the film as a milestone in Indonesia's history because of the widespread formula it introduced. The repeated use of Terang Boelan's formula has been criticised. The director Teguh Karya, for instance, denounced films that used it without building on it, leaving the formula "undeveloped and static".

Terang Boelan is considered lost, as are most domestic productions from the era. (Note: Heider (1991, p. 14) writes that all Indonesian films from before 1950 are lost. However, JB Kristanto's Katalog Film Indonesia (Indonesian Film Catalogue) records several as having survived at Sinematek Indonesia's archives, and Biran (2009, p. 351) writes that several Japanese propaganda films have survived at the Netherlands Government Information Service.) The Filipino film historian and director Nick Deocampo noted that productions made with nitrate film – such as Terang Boelan – burned easily and were thus easily lost, but suggested that copies of the film may have survived until the 1970s. In a 1991 publication Said, Heider, and the American translator John H. McGlynn expressed hope that a copy of the film might be lying around in someone's attic or closet in Indonesia or the Netherlands.

== See also ==
- List of lost films

== Works cited ==
- "Albert Balink". Bataviaasch Nieuwsblad (in Dutch). Batavia: Kolff & Co. 14 March 1938. p. 3.
- "Albert Balink". Encyclopedia of Jakarta (in Indonesian). Jakarta City Government. Archived from the original on 17 October 2012.
- Anwar, Rosihan (2004). Sejarah Kecil "petite histoire" Indonesia [A Short History of Indonesia] (in Indonesian). Jakarta: Kompas. ISBN 978-979-709-428-7.
- Barnard, Timothy P. (February 2010). "Film Melayu: Nationalism, Modernity and Film in a pre-World War Two Malay Magazine". Journal of Southeast Asian Studies. 41 (1). Singapore: McGraw-Hill Far Eastern Publishers: 47–70. doi:10.1017/S0022463409990257. ISSN 0022-4634. S2CID 162484792.
- Biran, Misbach Yusa (2009). Sejarah Film 1900–1950: Bikin Film di Jawa [History of Film 1900–1950: Making Films in Java] (in Indonesian). Jakarta: Komunitas Bamboo working with the Jakarta Art Council. ISBN 978-979-3731-58-2.
- Deocampo, Nick, ed. (2006). Lost Films of Asia. Manila: Anvil. ISBN 978-971-27-1861-8.
- "Een Film in Wording: Interessante avondopnamen" [A Film in Making: Interesting Night Shots]. De Indische Courant (in Dutch). Surabaya. 3 June 1937. p. 6.
- Esha, Teguh; Alhaziri, Wasmi; Fauzi, Muhammad; Donald W., Sabu; Sigarlaki, Erwin R. (2005). Ismail Marzuki: Musik, Tanah Air, dan Cinta [Ismail Marzuki: Music, Homeland, and Love] (in Indonesian). Yogyakarta: LP3ES. ISBN 978-979-3330-36-5.
- "Foreign Exchange". The New York Times. New York. 8 June 1938.(subscription required)
- van der Heide, William (2002). Malaysian Cinema, Asian Film: Border Crossings and National Cultures. Amsterdam: Amsterdam University Press. ISBN 978-90-5356-580-3.
- Heider, Karl G (1991). Indonesian Cinema: National Culture on Screen. Honolulu: University of Hawaii Press. ISBN 978-0-8248-1367-3.
- Khoo, Gaik Cheng (2006). Reclaiming Adat: Contemporary Malaysian Film and Literature. Vancouver: University of British Columbia Press. ISBN 978-0-7748-1172-9.
- "Kredit Lengkap" [Full Credits]. Filmindonesia.or.id (in Indonesian). Konfidan Foundation. Archived from the original on 19 February 2014.
- "Maleische Muzikale Film 'Terang Boelan'" [Malay Musical Film 'Terang Boelan']. De Indische Courant (in Dutch). Surabaya. 19 April 1937. p. 6.
- "Pareh". filmindonesia.or.id (in Indonesian). Jakarta: Konfidan Foundation. Archived from the original on 2 December 2013.
- Said, Salim (1982). Profil Dunia Film Indonesia [Profile of Indonesian Cinema] (in Indonesian). Jakarta: Grafiti Pers. OCLC 9507803.
- Said, Salim; McGlynn, John H.; Heider, Karl G (1991). Cinema of Indonesia: Eleven Indonesian Films, Notes & Synopses. New York: Festival of Indonesia Foundation. ISBN 978-1-879578-00-5.
- "Terang Boelan". Bataviaasch Nieuwsblad (in Dutch). Batavia: Kolff & Co. 9 December 1937. p. 3.
- "Terang Boelan". filmindonesia.or.id (in Indonesian). Jakarta: Konfidan Foundation. Archived from the original on 2 December 2013.
