= Resia Boroboedoer =

1929 film

- Starring: Olive Young
- Production company: Nancing Film Corp
- Release date: 1929 (Dutch East Indies)
- Country: Dutch East Indies
- Language: Silent

Resia Boroboedoer (Secret of Borobudur) is a 1929 adventure film produced by Nancing Film Corp. Starring Chinese actress Olive Young, it followed a young woman on her quest to find Gautama Buddha's ashes in the temple of Borobudur. The production cost of the film, which was panned, led to the collapse of its studio.

== Plot ==
Young Pei Fen goes from mainland China to Java. In her father's book Youn Lun Fah, she has read that a jar with Gautama Buddha's ashes is hidden in the temple of Borobudur. The temple's guardian, Gandha Soewasti, unsuccessfully forbids her from looking. When Young is out searching, betel juice drips onto her. Thinking that Gandha is behind this, she finds the guardian and beats her with a chair. Gandha's friend Koesoema tries to have vengeance on Young with black magic, but Gandha uses her own magic to stop him.

In the temple, Young finds a doorway leading down. However, she collapses after poisonous gas leaks from the room. Gandha rescues her and reveals that she owed a life debt to Young's father, Lun Fah, who had rescued her from a bandit thirty years earlier. Gandha had also given Lun Fah the book. Young decides to abandon her search for the ashes, and instead leads an ascetic life as a guard to the temple with Gandha.

== Production ==
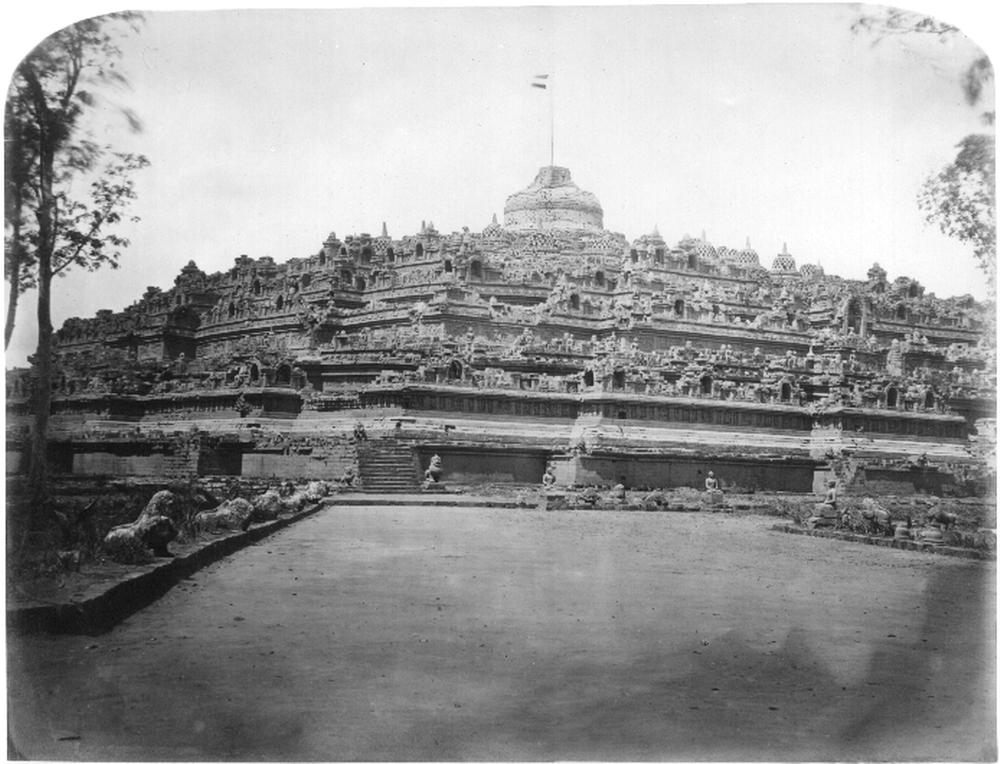
Borobudur, the film's setting, in 1873

Resia Borobudur was produced by the newly established Nancing Film Corp in 1928. It was the second film produced by Chinese conglomerates in the Indies, after Lily van Java (1928), and the first to be directly targeted at ethnic Chinese. The film was silent and shot in black and white.

Olive Young, a mixed-race woman from Shanghai, was cast in the lead role and paid a large sum of 2,000 Dutch guilders monthly for her work with the studio. She was widely known and reported for her sensuality, and not averse to kissing men in public, something considered unladylike at the time. This was reflected in the film, which showed Young in a bikini-like costume; this was the most skin yet shown in a film from the Dutch East Indies.

== Release and reception ==
Resia Borobudur was released in Batavia (modern day Jakarta) in July 1929. It was a critical flop and was generally decried as illogical and having poor image quality; viewers also described it as a "bastard" film due to Young's crudeness.The film critic Kwee Tek Hoay questioned how a girl from Sumatra could have found a Chinese-language book, or how Young could communicate with the Javanese – who could not speak Mandarin.

Nancing Film Corp went bankrupt after the film's release, from paying both Young's living costs and building a large studio in Batavia. Young went on to have a minor career in Hollywood.

== See also ==
- List of films of the Dutch East Indies
