= Grand Galaxy Park =

- Location: Bekasi, Indonesia
- Address: Jalan Galaxy Raya Blok A No. 1A, Grand Galaxy City, Bekasi 17147
- Owner: Agung Sedayu Group
- Parking: 641 cars

Grand Galaxy Park is a retail and entertainment space that contains a park, mall, school, and residential units.

== See also ==
- List of shopping malls in Indonesia
