= Lily van Java =

1928 film

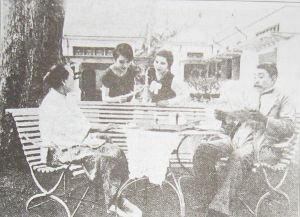
- A scene showing the film's main family
- Directed by: Nelson Wong
- Starring: Disputed; see production
- Cinematography: Wong brothers
- Production companies: South Sea Film; Halimoen Film
- Release date: 1928 (Dutch East Indies)
- Country: Dutch East Indies
- Language: Silent

Lilly van Java (Lily of Java), also known as Melatie van Java (Jasmine of Java), is a 1928 film from the Dutch East Indies directed by Nelson Wong. Initially meant to be produced by South Sea Film and shot by an American director, the film – which follows a woman told to marry a man she does not love – was ultimately completed by Wong's Halimoen Film. Details on its cast and performance are contradictory, although the film is recognised as the first of a long series of ethnic Chinese-produced films in the country. It is likely a lost film.

== Premise ==
The young daughter of a rich man, already in a loving relationship, is forced to marry someone she does not love.

== Production ==
The first two films produced in the Dutch East Indies, Loetoeng Kasaroeng (1926) and Eulis Atjih (1927), were made by the Dutch filmmakers L. Heuveldorp and George Krugers, respectively. Ethnic Chinese businessmen, capitalising on the success of films produced in Shanghai, China, established two production houses, one in Batavia (modern day Jakarta) and the other in Surabaya. South Sea Film, the production house in Batavia established by Liem Goan Lian and Tjan Tjoen Lian, was advertised as the first Chinese filmmaking cooperative in the country. Its first script was for Lily van Java; which the company had to pass through the Film Commissie (national censorship bureau) for fear of violating traditional values.

According to JB Kristanto's Katalog Film Indonesia (Indonesian Film Catalogue), an American named Len Ross was initially booked to direct the film; Ross was reportedly in the country to film a work entitled Java for Metro-Goldwyn-Mayer and shot several scenes in mid-1928. The cast was ethnic Chinese, and the female stars – Lie Lian Hwa and Lie Bo Tan – were reportedly daughters of the Surabayan gangster Lie Bauw Kie and trained in silat; other cast members included Kwee Tiang An and Yah Kwee Pang. However, after Ross withdrew the script was put on hold.

Nelson Wong, who had formerly been booked with his brothers Joshua and Othniel to record a film for Tio Tek Djien, approached David Wong (no relation), a high-ranking General Motors employee in Batavia, for funding. With this the Wong Brother's Halimoen Film was able to finish the film. Some sources indicate that the same cast was used, while others suggest that the leading role was taken by a student from Shanghai named Lily Oey.

The silent film was shot in black and white; its intertitles were bilingual, written in both Malay and Chinese. The American film historian Richard Abel writes that the film's technical quality, like all other local productions of the time, was poor and unable to compete with imported works, and the Indonesian film scholar Misbach Yusa Biran writes that the shots were considered blurry even at the time.

== Release and reception ==
Lily van Java was released in 1928. Its success is disputed. The reporter Leopold Gan wrote that the film was highly successful, to the point that after several years copies were worn through from overplaying. However, Joshua Wong later recalled in an interview that the film had been a failure; David Wong is reported to have avowed to no longer fund any films after Lily van Java. Lacking a backer, the Wong Brothers went on hiatus.

Lily van Java continues to be recorded as the first Chinese-produced film of the area. Although the Wongs went on hiatus, other ethnic Chinese became involved in film. Several Chinese owned start-ups are recorded from 1929 on, including Nancing Film with Resia Boroboedoer (1928) and Tan's Film with Njai Dasima (1929). By the early 1930s Chinese-owned businesses were the dominating force in the country's film industry.

The film is likely a lost film. The American visual anthropologist Karl G. Heider writes that all Indonesian films from before 1950 are lost. However, JB Kristanto's Katalog Film Indonesia (Indonesian Film Catalogue) records several as having survived at Sinematek Indonesia's archives, and Biran writes that several Japanese propaganda films have survived at the Netherlands Government Information Service.
