= Pareh =

1936 film by Mannus Franken, Albert Balink

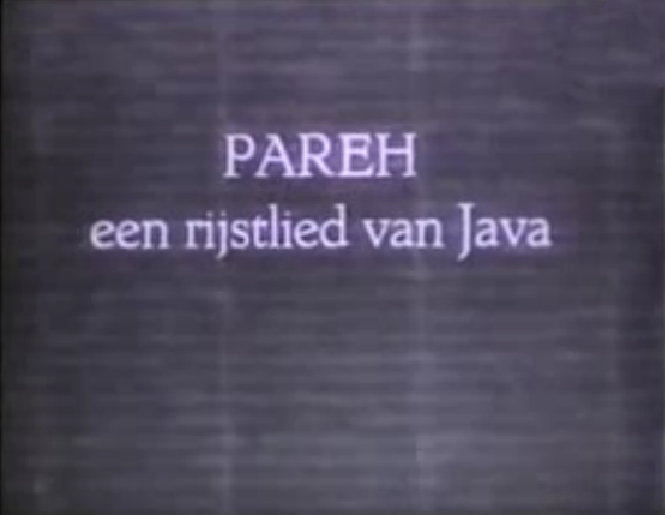
- Title card
- Directed by: Mannus Franken; Albert Balink
- Screenplay by: Mannus Franken; Albert Balink
- Produced by: Albert Balink
- Starring: Rd. Mochtar; Soekarsih; E. T. Effendy
- Cinematography: Mannus Franken; Joshua Wong; Othniel Wong
- Music by: Paul Schram
- Production company: Java Pacific Film
- Release date: 20 November 1936 (Netherlands)
- Running time: 92 minutes
- Country: Dutch East Indies
- Budget: 75,000 gulden

Pareh (Sundanese for "rice"), released internationally as Pareh, Song of the Rice, is a 1936 film from the Dutch East Indies (modern day Indonesia). Directed by the Dutchmen Albert Balink and Mannus Franken, it featured an amateur native cast and starred Raden Mochtar and Soekarsih. The story follows the forbidden love between a fisherman and a farmer's daughter.

Balink began work on the film in 1934, working with the Wong brothers, who served as cinematographers. They gathered a budget of 75,000 gulden – several times the budget of other local productions – and brought Franken from the Netherlands to assist in production. The film was edited in the Netherlands after being shot in the Indies. The film was a commercial and critical success with European audiences, but disliked by native ones; despite this success, Pareh bankrupted its producers.

Pareh resulted in a change in the cinema of Dutch East Indies, which had been Chinese-oriented for several years; films began to make more effort at targeting local audiences. Balink later found commercial success with Terang Boelan (1937). The American visual anthropologist Karl G. Heider considers Pareh and Terang Boelan the two most important cinematic works from the Dutch East Indies during the 1930s.

== Premise ==
Mahmud (Rd. Mochtar), a fisherman, is in love with Wagini (Soekarsih), a farmer's daughter. However, local superstition dictates that their relationship will bring disaster. This seems to prove true after the village leader's keris is stolen, but eventually Mahmud and Wagini are able to unite with the help of his fellow villagers.

== Production ==
During 1934 and early 1935, all feature films released in the Dutch East Indies had been produced by The Teng Chun, based on Chinese mythology or martial arts, and targeted at low-class audiences, generally ethnic Chinese. This situation was created by the Great Depression, which had led to the Dutch East Indies government collecting higher taxes, advertisers asking for more money, and cinemas selling tickets at lower prices; this ensured that there was a very low profit margin for local films. During this period cinemas in the country mainly showed Hollywood productions.

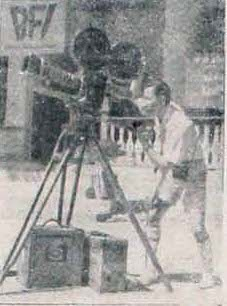
One of the Wong brothers, c. 1947

Albert Balink, a Dutch journalist, began work on what was to become Pareh in 1934. Unlike The Teng Chun, the inexperienced Balink chose to target his film at Dutch audiences. He brought in two of the Wong brothers, Chinese filmmakers who had been inactive since making Zuster Theresia (Sister Theresa) in 1932. The Wongs donated their studio – an old tapioca flour factory – as well as filmmaking equipment. Meanwhile, much of the funding came from other backers. According to the Indonesian film historian Misbach Yusa Biran, the money came from the cinema mogul Buse, while EYE Film Institute records indicate that the film was backed by the Centrale Commissie voor Emigratie en Kolonisatie van Inheemschen and meant to promote migration from Java to Sumatra.

Balink and the Wongs spent most of two years compiling the necessary funds, with Balink in charge of general operations as the head of Java Pacific Film, a joint operation. Balink insisted on perfection and had a clear idea what kind of actor he wanted in the film. Unlike earlier filmmakers in the country, Balink invested time and money in searching for the best locations and actors possible, without considering whether a person was already a celebrity. Ultimately, most of those cast for Pareh had not acted before, including stars Mochtar and Soekarsih.

The role of Mahmud was filled when Balink was out with coffee with Joshua and Othniel Wong and saw a young man, tall, strong, and handsome – as he expected for the role – driving by. Balink called the Wongs and they got into their car, then chased and caught the young man. The man, Mochtar, a Javanese of noble descent, was told to use the title Raden for the film, which he and his family had already abandoned. According to the Indonesian anthropologist Albertus Budi Susanto, the emphasis on Mochtar's title was meant as a way to draw a higher-class audience.

Artistic direction and some of the screenwriting was handled by Mannus Franken, an avant-garde documentary filmmaker from the Netherlands, whom Balink had brought to the Indies. Franken insisted on including ethnographic shots to better present the local culture to international audiences. Franken took an interest in the documentary and ethnographic aspects of the film, directing the shots for these portions, while the Wongs handled the general shots. According to Biran, this was reflected in the camera angles used.

Pareh, which had been recorded on 35 mm film using single-system devices, was brought to the Netherlands for editing. There the original voices of the cast were dubbed by actors in the Netherlands, resulting in stilted language use and heavy Dutch accents. Though initially the filmmakers had planned on using gamelan music, the poor quality of the recording equipment in the Indies led to the soundtrack being redone, using European-style music, in the Netherlands.

From start to finish the production of Pareh cost 75,000 gulden (approximately US$ 51,000), 20 times as much as a regular local production. After editing there were 2,061 metres of film, equivalent to 92 minutes of runtime.

== Release and reception ==
Pareh was screened in the Netherlands as Pareh, een Rijstlied van Java (also noted as Het Lied van de Rijst) beginning on 20 November 1936. The film was also shown in the Indies. It was unable to recoup its costs and bankrupted the producers. The film was critically acclaimed in the Netherlands, partially owing to the emphasis of Franken's involvement. Although it was a commercial success amongst the intelligentsia in the Indies, Pareh was a failure with lower-class native audiences. Mochtar never viewed the film in full.

Historical reception of Pareh has generally been positive. Writing in 1955, the Indonesian author and cultural critic Armijn Pane opined that Pareh was technically unparalleled in contemporary Indies cinema, with careful continuity and dynamic cuts. He was critical, however, of the film's tendency to see the Indies' native population through European eyes and depict them as "primitive". The American film historian John Lent, writing in 1990, described Pareh as a "meticulously detailed and costly" film which attempted to not only earn money, but show the local culture. The American visual anthropologist Karl G. Heider considers Pareh one of the two most important cinematic works from the Dutch East Indies during the 1930s; Balink's later work Terang Boelan (Full Moon; 1937) was the other. Heider, John H. McGlynn, and Salim Said note that the film was of acceptable technical quality but is best remembered for changing the path of cinematic developments in the country.

== Legacy ==
The release of Pareh was followed by a shift in genres popularised by the local cinema. The Teng Chun, who – together with Balink – continued to be the only active filmmaker in the country until 1937, began focusing on more modern stories and those which would be popular with native audiences. Biran suggests that this was influenced by Pareh. Other filmmakers in the late 1930s, partially inspired by Pareh, began to improve the quality of the audio in their films. Pane notes that, following Pareh, films produced domestically no longer centred around ethnic European casts.

Mochtar and Soekarsih, who first met on the set of Pareh, married after appearing together in Terang Boelan. This later production included much of the same cast and was highly successful, leading to a renewed interest in filmmaking in the Indies. Terang Boelan proved to be the most successful local production until 1953's Krisis (Crisis), released after Indonesia had become independent.

== See also ==
- List of films of the Dutch East Indies
