= Tan Boen Soan =

Chinese Indonesian journalist

- Born: 25 June 1905; Sukabumi, West Java
- Died: 12 August 1952 (aged 47)
- Occupations: Writer, journalist
- Years active: 1920s–1952

Tan Boen Soan (Chinese: 陈文宣; 25 June 1905 – 12 August 1952) was an ethnic Chinese Malay-language writer and journalist from Sukabumi, Java. He was the author of works such as Koetoekannja Boenga Srigading (1933), Bergerak (1935), Digdaja (1935) and Tjoban (1936). He later wrote for the Sunday Courier of Jakarta.

== Biography ==
Tan was born in Sukabumi, West Java, on 25 June 1905. He began his education in a Hollandsche Chineesche School, a school for ethnic Chinese children run by the colonial government of the Dutch East Indies, there. Aside from his studies, he also active in the student organisation Chung Hsioh. He later attended the Koningin Wilhelminaschool in Batavia (now Jakarta). Afterwards he spent some time working for the rail line Staats Spoorwagen in the city, before returning to Sukabumi and writing articles for the Chinese-owned dailies Sin Po and Perniagaan.

In 1920 Tan became a member of the editorial board for the Bandung-based Sin Bin; he stayed with the newspaper until it closed, migrating to Keng Po. In 1928 he produced an adaptation of Tjoe Hong Bok's novel Setangan Berloemoer Darah, a story in which a son attempts to avenge his father's murder. This silent film in black-and-white was the second adaptation of a novel in the Indies.

Through the 1930s, Tan headed a variety of publications, including Warna Warta (1931–32), the Sukabumi-based biweekly Asia, and the Semarang-based Soeara Semarang. During this decade he published several novels in the literary magazines Tjerita Roman and Penghidoepan, including works such as Koetoekannja Boenga Srigading (1933), Bergerak (1935), Digdaja (1935), Kembang Latar (1937), and Tjoban (1936).

Tan's 1935 novel Oewang criticised the tendency for ethnic Chinese in the Indies to value money too greatly. Another of his novels, Bwee Ha (1940), warned of the risks of rejecting tradition and the "natural order". However, he also saw the dangers of blindly adhering to tradition, and his Lelatoe Anaknja Api (1933) urged that divorced or widowed women be allowed to remarry – something forbidden at the time. Chinese nationalist themes, likely included as a protest against the 1933 Japanese occupation of Jehol, can be seen in his silat novel Pendekar Merah (1935). Tan's 1935 novel Bergerak focused on the role of women in social movements; this novel was republished in 2002 as in the sixth volume of the anthology series Kesastraan Melayu Tionghoa dan Kebangsaan Indonesia.

Sukarno proclaimed Indonesian independence in 1945, and this was recognised by the Dutch in 1949. During this time frame Tan headed Sin Min in Semarang. He also contributed writings to the Jakarta-based Sedar and the Sunday Courier. In 1951 Tan was accused of being a member of "Barisan Tjitaroem", considered a subversive group by the Indonesian government. He was imprisoned and tortured before being released. Tan died not long afterwards, on 12 August 1952.

== Partial bibliography ==
- Lelatoe Anaknja Api!. Tjerita Roman 54 (in Malay). Surabaya: Hahn & Co. 1933. OCLC 819655409. (98 pages)
- Koetoekannja Boenga Srigading [Curse of the Srigading Flower]. Penghidoepan 103 (in Malay). Surabaya: Tan's Drukkerij. 1933. OCLC 475694532. (104 pages)
- Yin Lan. Tjerita Roman 69 (in Malay). Surabaya: Hahn & Co. 1934. OCLC 68937664. (126 pages)
- Oewang [Money]. Tjerita Roman 73 (in Malay). Surabaya: Hahn & Co. 1935. OCLC 68827841. (115 pages)
- Pendekar Merah [Red Warrior]. Tjerita Roman 81 (in Malay). Surabaya: Hahn & Co. 1935. OCLC 68827847. (121 pages)
- Setan dan Amor [Demons and Love]. Tjerita Roman 82 (in Malay). Surabaya: Hahn & Co. 1935. OCLC 775790636. (128 pages; adapted from The Kreutzer Sonata by Leo Tolstoy)
- Bergerak? [Move?]. Penghidoepan 124 (in Malay). Surabaya: Tan's Drukkerij. 1935. OCLC 503138719. (101 pages)
- Anem Taon dalam Noraka [Six Years in Hell]. Penghidoepan 126 (in Malay). Surabaya: Tan's Drukkerij. 1935. OCLC 25816868. (131 pages)
- Digdaja. Penghidoepan 128 (in Malay). Surabaya: Tan's Drukkerij. 1935. OCLC 501332223. (102 pages)
- Empangan Darah: Satoe Lelakon Tertarik dari Perang Besar Taon 1906 [A Dam of Blood: A Story Based on the Great War of 1906]. Penghidoepan 130 (in Malay). Surabaya: Tan's Drukkerij. 1935. OCLC 501188631. (118 pages)
- Rossy. Tjerita Roman 95 (in Malay). Surabaya: Niro Thay Siang. 1937. OCLC 68827846. (116 pages)
- Tjoban. Penghidoepan 133 (in Malay). Surabaya: Tan's Drukkerij. 1936. OCLC 63889100. (112 pages; sequel to Digdaja)
- Tjoeram Penghidoepan [Cliffs of Life]. Penghidoepan 140 (in Malay). Surabaya: Tan's Drukkerij. 1936. OCLC 227807172. (110 pages)
- Seroeni Poetih [White Chrysanthemums]. Tjerita Roman 90 (in Malay). Surabaya: Hahn & Co. 1936. OCLC 775790049. (121 pages; based on Claude Anet's Mayerling)
- Lukouchiao-Shanghai!. Tjerita Roman 102 (in Malay). Malang: Paragon Press. 1937. OCLC 68827848. (98 pages)
- Kembang Latar [Prostitutes]. Tjerita Roman 106 (in Malay). Malang: Paragon Press. 1937. OCLC 775790625. (120 pages)
- See-ie. Tjerita Roman 120 (in Malay). Malang: Paragon Press. 1938. OCLC 68017028. (104 pages)
- Baba Fantasie. Tjerita Roman 129 (in Malay). Malang: Paragon Press. 1939. OCLC 819659744. (109 pages)
- Bwee Hoa. Tjerita Roman 138 (in Malay). Malang: Paragon Press. 1940. OCLC 819655816. (138 pages)
