= Albert Balink =

Dutch journalist and filmmaker (1906–1976)

- Balink in the 1930s
- Born: 3 August 1906 's-Hertogenbosch, Netherlands
- Died: 8 February 1976 (aged 69); Pensacola, Florida, United States
- Occupations: Journalist, filmmaker
- Years active: 1920s–1950s
- Notable work: Pareh; Terang Boelan

Albert Balink (3 August 1906 – 8 February 1976) was a Dutch journalist and filmmaker who contributed to early Indonesian cinema. Born in the Netherlands, he began a career in film journalism in the Dutch East Indies. A self-taught filmmaker, in the mid-1930s, he released a documentary and two feature films, before immigrating to the United States and resuming his journalistic career.

== Biography ==
Balink was born in 's-Hertogenbosch, Netherlands. In the 1920s and early 1930s he was a reporter with De Locomotief, a newspaper based in Semarang, Dutch East Indies, and the Soematra Post, based in Medan. He wrote extensively about film while working at these papers.

In 1934, Balink established the Java Pacific Film production company with the Wong brothers, headquartered in an old Bandoeng tapioca flour factory. Inexperienced with film, Balink had attained only theoretical knowledge gained from self-instruction. The company's first production was a documentary film, De Merapi Dreigt (Mount Merapi Looms), released in 1934. Advertised as the first documentary film with sound in the Dutch East Indies, it was a critical success. However, Balink's main interest lay in feature films, intending to reach an upper-class audience in contrast to the feature films of The Teng Chun, traditionally based on Chinese mythology or martial arts, and targeted at lower-class audiences, generally ethnic Chinese.

The studio, working with director Mannus Franken, then produced Pareh (Rice; 1936), an ethnographic film considered a forerunner to the Indonesia Indah films. Balink had brought Franken to the country to ensure the film's quality. As well as writing the screenplay, Franken co-directed and co-produced the film with Balink, who worked to secure funding from various sponsors and was in charge of casting, searching the country extensively for appropriate actors. Ultimately the film was a flop and bankrupted the company, including Balink, having cost 75,000 gulden to produce. Despite this, it was well received in the Netherlands.

Balink established renewed financial backing to found the Dutch Indies Film Syndicate (Algemeen Nederlandsch Indisch Filmsyndicaat, or ANIF), which produced its first newsreel on 22 December 1936, featuring the Gambir Market, and festivities at the palace of the Governor-General, including the inauguration of the last Dutch East Indies Governor-General, Tjarda van Starkenborgh Stachouwer. In 1937, Balink directed Terang Boelan (Full Moon), described as the first full-length Indonesian film in Malay. The story, following a young couple who have not received their parents' blessings, was written by the reporter Saeroen. Terang Boelan proved to be the most commercially successful Indonesian production until the 1953 film, Krisis (Crisis), released after the country's independence. Despite his success, the studio's backers disapproved of Balink's interest in feature films. He left the country for the United States, attempting a career as a Hollywood director, which was unsuccessful. Reviewing early Indonesian cinema, in 1991 the American visual anthropologist Karl G. Heider wrote that Pareh and Terang Boelan were the two most important cinematic works from the Dutch East Indies during the 1930s.

In March 1938 Balink immigrated to the United States, became a citizen, and worked as a correspondent for Dutch daily newspaper, de Volkskrant. The 1940 United States Census indicates that he was living in Queens, New York, with his wife, Lydia. From New Jersey and twelve years his junior, Lydia worked with Balink as his secretary. In 1948, he published a socioeconomic study of the Caribbean, My Paradise is Hell. In the 1950s he founded and edited a magazine, The Knickerbocker, a publication aimed at Dutch Americans. The magazine was instrumental in allowing Dutch baseball player, Han Urbanus to train with the New York Giants. Urbanus used this experience to further develop baseball in the Netherlands. Also in the 1950s, Balink chaired the committee for the William the Silent Award for Journalism. In early 1953 he served as executive of Holland Flood Relief Inc., which helped coordinate relief efforts during the North Sea flood of 1953. Balink was an active amateur tennis player.

Albert Balink died in Pensacola, Florida, on 8 February 1976.

== Filmography ==
- De Merapi Dreigt (Mount Merapi Looms; 1934)
- Pareh (Rice; 1936)
- Terang Boelan (Full Moon; 1937)

== Bibliography ==
- Biran, Misbach Yusa (2009). Sejarah Film 1900–1950: Bikin Film di Jawa [History of Film 1900–1950: Making Films in Java] (in Indonesian). Komunitas Bamboo working with the Jakarta Art Council. ISBN 978-979-3731-58-2.
