= Wong brothers =

Three ethnic Chinese film directors and cameramen

The Wong brothers, unknown year

The Wong brothers were three ethnic Chinese film directors and cameramen active in the cinema of the Dutch East Indies (now Indonesia). The sons of an Adventist preacher, the brothers – Nelson (1895–1945), Joshua (1906–1981), and Othniel (1908–1986) – received much of their education in the United States before going to Shanghai and establishing The Great Wall Productions.

By 1927, Nelson had arrived in the Dutch East Indies and was working with Miss Riboet's Orion, a theatrical troupe. When its owner Tio Tek Djien suggested he make a film with the troupe's star, Nelson insisted that his family be brought to the Indies. Although this initial film was not realised, the brothers made numerous feature films with different studios under the banner Halimoen Film, starting with Lily van Java (1929). After a two-year hiatus, during which Nelson fell ill, Joshua and Othniel worked with Albert Balink and Mannus Franken to produce Pareh, a commercial failure which bankrupted its producers.

The Wongs collaborated again with Balink on Terang Boelan in 1937, a commercial success which left the brothers rich. They began working with Tan's Film afterwards, making another five films with the company. After the Japanese occupation Joshua and Othniel became merchants, returning to film in 1948 with the Tan brothers. Their new company produced 45 films, although the Wongs were not involved in all of them.

== Youth ==
The Wong brothers were the sons of Wong Siong Tek, an Adventist clergyman. Nelson was born in 1895, Joshua in 1906, and Othniel in 1908. The Indonesian film historian Misbach Yusa Biran writes that the brothers were born in China and later went to the United States, Nelson in 1920 and his family some time afterwards; however, the Sinematek Indonesia publication Apa Siapa Orang Film Indonesia (Who and What: Indonesian Filmmakers) indicates that Nelson was born in San Francisco and raised in China, and lists the brothers as attending several American schools as early as 1916.

In the early 1920s Nelson spent time in Los Angeles, ostensibly to get a college education. However, he instead focused on learning about the developing film industry, spending time watching productions with The Teng Chun and Fred Young. He reportedly received small parts on the crew, working with cables and electricity. Biran writes that Nelson was one of the cameramen for The Three Musketeers in 1921. Around this time Joshua and Othniel became active in film, studying under their brother. However, their family disapproved of this and later disowned them.

By the mid-1920s the Wong brothers had left the US and moved to Shanghai, China, where they established The Great Wall, a film company sponsored by a Chinese-American. The Wongs showed no interest in adapting Chinese myths and legends – works which other studios often adapted – instead focusing on modern stories. The company is recorded as making a single work, in 1924, but closed soon after.

== Early works ==
Nelson emigrated from Shanghai to the Dutch East Indies by 1927, when he is recorded as a cashier at the Miss Riboet's Orion drama troupe owned by Tio Tek Djien; Wong Siong Tek may have been preaching in the area as well. Tio, later learning that Wong had experience in film, asked him to record the troupe's performances. Nelson did so, using a simple camera. The ability to make films convinced Tio that a feature film would be a profitable venture; the country's first domestically produced film, Loetoeng Kasaroeng, had been released in 1926. Nelson agreed, but only on the condition that Tio bring his brothers to the Indies. Tio helped the younger Wongs immigrate, spending several thousand gulden for transportation for them and their equipment.

When the brothers arrived in the Indies, Tio bought an old tapioca flour factory in Bandung for them to use as a studio. Nelson and Tio began plans to make a film starring Miss Riboet, the star of Tio's troupe, but these were cancelled after discovering that Riboet's face was "not photogenic". (Note: Original: ... wajahnya tidak baik untuk kamera.) Tio pulled out, but the Wongs were able to find another financier, a General Motors employee named David Wong. (Note: No relation)

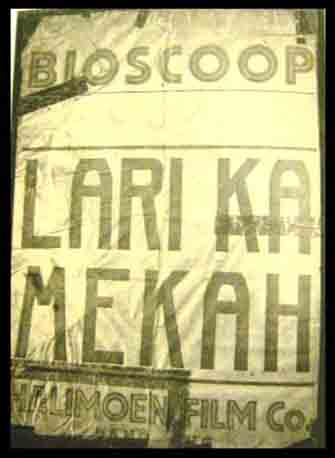
Original poster for Lari ke Mekah, which was renamed after the censorship bureau considered it may be offensive to Muslims

The brothers decided to complete Lily van Java (Lily of Java), a film which had been partially worked on by South Sea Film in Batavia (modern day Jakarta); South Sea had reportedly booked an American named Len Ross to direct, but after shooting several scenes he left the country. Reports differ on the success of the film: the reporter Leopold Gan described it as doing very well, to the point its reels were damaged from overuse, while Joshua Wong recalled it as having been a commercial failure. After the film, David Wong backed out and the brothers were left without a financier.

The brothers, under the banner Halimoen Film, began taking orders from several different studios, with Nelson, Joshua, and Othniel serving in various roles in the crew. In 1929 the brothers worked with Batavia Motion Pictures to produce the Chinese-oriented bandit film Si Tjonat, which was fairly well received. (Note: Batavia Motion Pictures, however, was dissolved afterwards.) They also produced the action film Rampok Preanger independently, a film which may have been based on an American work and starred a Chinese actor and native keroncong singer, and shot the drama Melati van Agam (Jasmine of Agam).

In 1930 the Wongs produced Lari ke Arab (Escape to Arabia), an original script written by Joshua that the brothers worked on collaboratively; the film was originally entitled Lari ke Mekah (Escape to Mecca), but the Film Commissie (national censorship board) refused the title as it could be insulting to Muslims. This was followed in 1931 by several films, including the brothers' first talkie Indonesia Malaise (Indonesia in a Depression), an unsuccessful comedy produced with M. H. Schilling about a woman who pines for her imprisoned lover; the film was prefaced with another Wong–Schilling collaboration, Sinjo Tjo Main di Film (Sinjo Tjo Acts in a Film), based on Schilling's radio work. The brothers' final work that year, Si Pitoeng, adapted the story of the Betawi bandit Si Pitung and cast an ethnic-Chinese actor in the role.

The brothers were commissioned by Schilling in 1932 to film Zuster Theresia (Sister Theresia), a talkie targeted at the Dutch population of the Indies which followed a man who falls in love with his nanny despite being married. Based on the film's plot, Biran suggests that the Wongs had little creative influence. Zuster Theresia was a critical failure and Halimoen Films closed soon after.

== Pareh and Terang Boelan ==
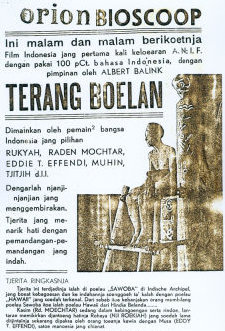
Terang Boelan, for which the brothers handled cinematography, was the most successful film of the Dutch East Indies

Nelson became sickly around 1934 and went on hiatus; he died in Surabaya in 1945. However, Joshua and Othniel remained in the industry, and in late 1933 or early 1934 were introduced to Albert Balink, a reporter from the Soematra Post in Medan. Balink intended to shock the market with an expensive film with high production values, in contrast to the budget films by The Teng Chun which were dominating the market. The Wongs were asked to house the company in their studio and help with the cinematography.

Over a period of almost two years Joshua and Othniel worked with Balink to scout shooting locations and potential cast members, including joining a car chase which resulted in Rd. Mochtar being cast in the lead role. The resulting film, Pareh (Rice), followed the forbidden love between a fisherman and a farmer's daughter, and was edited in the Netherlands by co-director Mannus Franken. The film was unable to recoup its 75,000 gulden production costs and the producers were left financially devastated after its 1936 release. However, it resulted in a shift towards higher production values in the country's film industry.

Within a year the Wongs had rejoined Balink, this time at the Algemeen Nederlandsch Indisch Filmsyndicaat (Dutch Indies Film Syndicate, or ANIF); Balink had found several international backers to fund the studio and promised to work on documentaries, with the Wongs on camera. However, in early 1937 Balink and the Wongs began working on a new film, hiring the journalist Saeroen to write the script. The Wongs handled cinematography for the film, which starred Rd. Mochtar and Roekiah.

The resulting work, which told of a woman who elopes with her lover, was released under the title Terang Boelan (Full Moon) in 1937 or 1938. It was a commercial success, earning 200,000 Straits dollars in British Malaya and reviving the country's faltering film industry. It proved to be the most successful production in the area until 1953's Krisis (Crisis), released after Indonesia had become independent. Despite this success, ANIF began focusing on documentary films, causing Balink to leave the country and the Wongs – newly rich because of their share of Terang Boelan's profits – to open a new studio before ultimately being signed to Tan's Film.

== Tan's Film ==
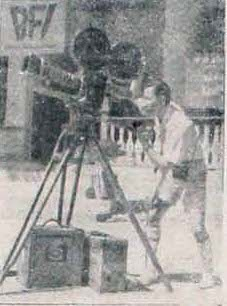
One of the Wong brothers, c. 1947

The Wongs were not the only persons from Terang Boelan to join Tan's. Much of the film's main cast returned for Tan's 1938 film Fatima, which featured the Wongs as directors and Saeroen as screenwriter; the film followed a woman who is wooed by a gangster whilst she is in love with another man. The following year the brothers directed another work for Tan's, the Zorro-inspired Gagak Item (The Black Crow).

The brothers remained with Tan's through early 1940, directing the dramas Sorga Ka Toedjoe (Seventh Heaven) Siti Akbari, and Roekihati. However, in late 1940 Joshua, upset over what he perceived as an unfair division of the profits, left Tan's and worked on Kris Mataram (Kris of Mataram) for the rival studio Oriental Film. The film, a love story between a noblewoman and commoner, proved to be the Wongs' last production for eight years, in part owing to the Japanese invasion which led to almost all studios being closed.

== Post-independence ==
During the occupation the Wongs became merchants, a business they continued after the country proclaimed its independence in 1945. In 1948 they reunited with the Tan brothers to establish Tan & Wong Bros; the company's first production, Air Mata Mengalir di Tjitarum (Tears Flow in Tjitarum), was released the same year.

After the death of Nelson in 1945, Joshua and Othniel remained active with Tan & Wong Bros throughout the 1950s, even after the company changed its name to Tjendrawasih Film; the company produced a total of 45 films, although not all were handled by the Wongs. Around this time they took the Indonesianised family name Widjaja. Othniel had a daughter, Mira, in 1951; after dabbling in film she became a writer. He and his wife had a total of five children.

Joshua and Othniel stayed active in the industry throughout the 1970s, serving as advisers and at times working on the production crew. They individually received awards for their contributions to the film industry from Governor of Jakarta Ali Sadikin in 1973. Joshua died on 17 June 1981.
