= Producing house =

Theatre producing its own shows in-house

A producing house is a theatre which ‘manufactures' its own shows in-house (such as plays, musicals, opera, or dance) and perhaps does everything from honing the script, building the set, casting the actors and designing and making the costumes.

The shows that are produced are then shown at that theatre or sent to others which do not produce their own material (known as receiving houses).

Some theatres may produce some of their own shows, but also rent its facilities to shows produced elsewhere. These venues are both "producing" and "receiving" houses.

Most West End and Broadway theatres are not producing houses as the venue solely provides facilities to the incoming show even though the production may stay for many years.

Producing houses at the larger end (for example the Royal Shakespeare Company and the Royal National Theatre) employ hundreds of staff across a multitude of departments concerned with the manufacture of theatre: set design, costume making, wig making, prop making, etc, with full time resident companies of actors etc.
