= Sejarah Film 1900–1950 =

2009 book by Misbach Yusa Biran

- Cover, first edition
- Author: Misbach Yusa Biran
- Language: Indonesian
- Subject: Cinema of the Dutch East Indies
- Publisher: Komunitas Bambu; Jakarta Arts Council
- Publication date: August 2009
- Publication place: Indonesia
- Media type: Softcover
- Pages: 443
- ISBN: 9789793731582

Sejarah Film 1900–1950: Bikin Film di Jawa (Indonesian for History of Film 1900–1950: Making Films in Java) is a 2009 history of the cinema of the Dutch East Indies (modern-day Indonesia) written by Misbach Yusa Biran. It was published by Komunitas Bambu in collaboration with the Jakarta Arts Council and well received. The book was written by Biran before his death, three years later.

== Contents ==
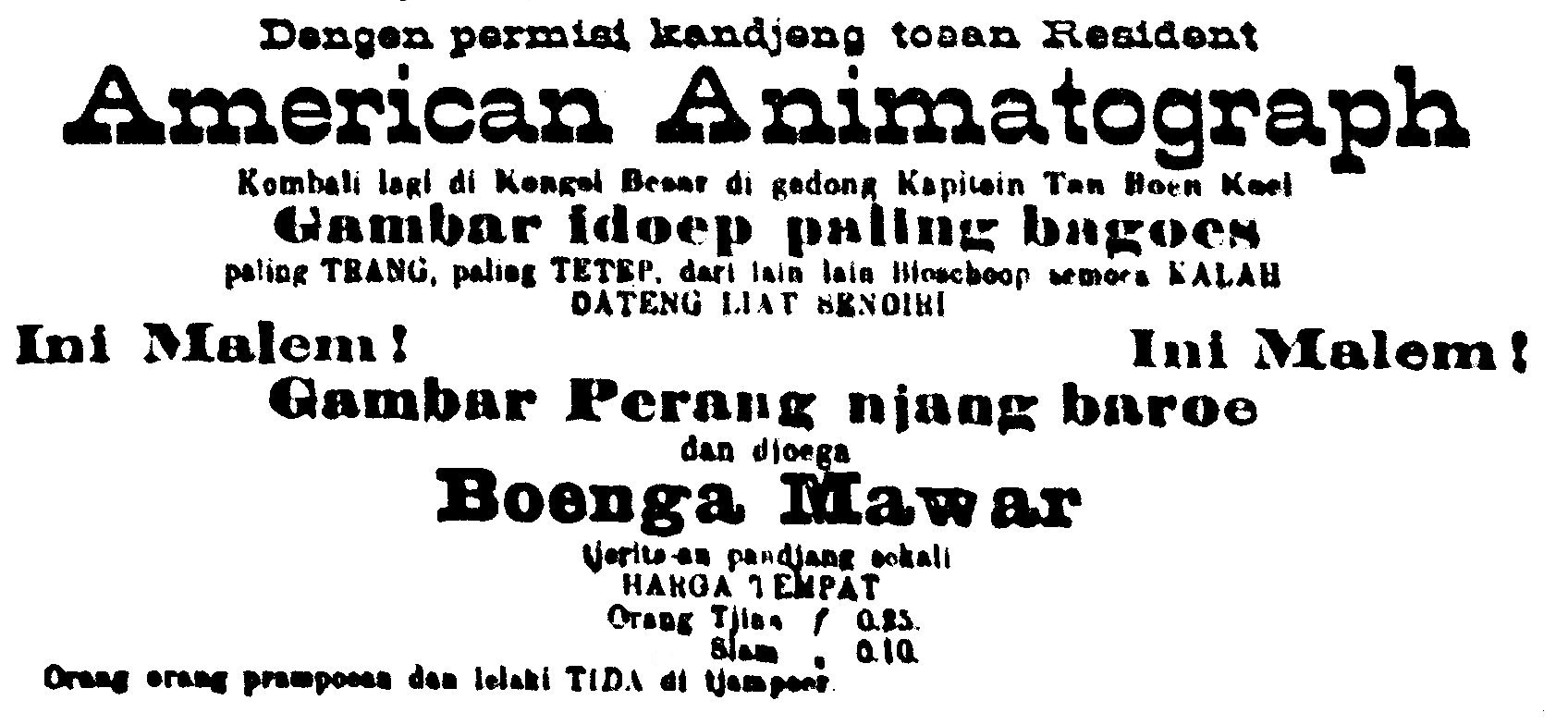
An example of an image from the book: a 1905 advertisement for a film screening

Sejarah Film 1900–1950 consists of three chapters and has numerous illustrations, including photographs of significant figures and locations, film posters, advertisements, promotional stills, and magazine covers. The book's foreword, entitled "Menghindar Kekacauan dan Menolak Pengabaian" ("Avoiding Chaos and Refusing Ignorance") was written by film producer and critic Eric Sasono. The book has seven appendices, including a list of films of the Dutch East Indies, list of cinemas, and reproductions of correspondence between film personnel from the Indies. Sourcing for the book is mixed, ranging from personal interviews to contemporary newspaper accounts and letters.

In a foreword, Biran discusses the first films screened in the Dutch East Indies (now Indonesia) and their development, beginning in 1900 and continuing until the mid-1920s. He further outlines the roles of the travelling stage troupes in the colony's entertainment industry during the period. At the end of this introduction, he suggests that the films from this period, released before Usmar Ismail's Darah dan Doa (1950), could not be considered truly "Indonesian" as they were commercially oriented.

The following chapter covers the early efforts to make documentaries and fictional films. This chapter includes extensive discussion of the various directors and producers active in the period, as well as numerous films: these include the first fictional film in the Indies, Loetoeng Kasaroeng (1926), the first sound film in the colony, Karnadi Anemer Bangkong (1930), and the period's most successful film, Terang Boelan (1937).

The second chapter, the book's longest, discusses the golden period of Indies' films between 1939 and 1941. It includes discussions of the major production houses of the time, all owned by ethnic Chinese. It further discusses various trends at the time, including the star system, reportage of the industry, and common themes. Films discussed in this chapter include the action film Rentjong Atjeh, the romance Kartinah (both 1940), and the early supernatural thriller Tengkorak Hidoep.

The final chapter discusses the state of the film industry during the Japanese occupation (1942–1945) and ensuing National Revolution (1945–1949). Topics include the Japanese propaganda during the occupation and early films by Usmar Ismail late in the revolution, as well as the activities of the news agency Berita Film Indonesia.

== Background ==
Misbach Yusa Biran, the author of Sejarah Film 1900–1950, was a former screenwriter who had become active in the cinema of Indonesia in the 1950s. By the 1970s he had become best known as an archivist, and he was one of the founders of the Indonesian film archive Sinematek Indonesia. Armando Siahaan, reviewing for The Jakarta Globe, considered the book a "natural extension" of Biran's previous work.

The basic content in Sejarah Film 1900–1950 was initially published as Film Indonesia Bagian I: 1900–1950 in 1993, which Biran had written together with SM Ardan and Taufik Abdullah. Biran rewrote the initial work as he found the organisation too random, polishing as he went.

== Release and reception ==
Sejarah Film 1900–1950 was published in August 2009 by Komunitas Bambu in collaboration with the Jakarta Arts Council. Siahaan wrote that the book was "a must for movie buffs", highlighting its readability and use of primary sources. He found the book "both interesting and highly credible." Ekky Imanjaya, writing in Kompas, described the book as a "sacred text from a film warrior" (Kitab Sakti dari Pendekar Film) and an attempt at applying Thomas Elsaesser's theories of media archaeology in an Indonesian context. He notes some statements, such as that the first film screened in the Indies came in 1900, were generally accepted but likely false. Renal Rinoza Kasturi, reviewing for the Indonesian film journal Jurnal Footage, praised the book, especially its images.

== Works cited ==
- Biran, Misbach Yusa (2009). Sejarah Film 1900–1950: Bikin Film di Jawa [History of Film 1900–1950: Making Films in Java] (in Indonesian). Jakarta: Komunitas Bamboo working with the Jakarta Art Council. ISBN 978-979-3731-58-2.
- Imanjaya, Ekky (3 January 2010). "Sebuah Kitab Sakti dari Pendekar Film" [A Sacred Text from a Film Warrior]. Kompas (in Indonesian). (subscription required)
- Kasturi, Renal Rinoza (13 November 2009). "Dosa Asal Tak Berampun Dalam Catatan Historiografi Film Indonesia" [Unforgivable Original Sin in the Historiography of Indonesian Film]. Jurnal Footage (in Indonesian). Archived from the original on 31 August 2012.
- Siahaan, Armando (10 November 2009). "Book 'Sejarah Film' Chronicles Early Days of Indonesian Film". The Jakarta Globe.
