= Karl G. Heider =

American visual anthropologist

- Born: Karl Heider; 21 January 1935 (age 91); Hampshire County, Massachusetts, U.S.
- Education: Harvard College
- Occupation: Anthropologist
- Spouse: Eleanor Rosch
- Father: Fritz Heider

Karl G. Heider (born January 21, 1935) is an American visual anthropologist.

== Life and education ==
Heider was born in Northampton, Massachusetts. Heider is the son of psychologists Fritz and Grace (née Moore) Heider. He had two brothers; John and Stephan.

After spending two years at Williams College, Heider transferred to Harvard College where he earned his B.A. in anthropology. Heider then spent a year touring Asia on a Sheldon Traveling Fellowship provided by Harvard. Returning to Harvard in 1958, Heider went on to earn an M.A. in 1959 and Ph.D. in 1966.

He was married to the psychologist Eleanor Rosch with whom he studied the Dani people. The couple divorced in the late 1970s.

== Career ==
Heider's work ranged from psychological anthropology to visual anthropology.

It has included going into the West Papua region in the 1960s and 1990s, as well as producing works on ethnographic film making and writing on Indonesian cinema.

== Filmography ==
- Tikal (1961)
- Dani Sweet Potatoes (1974)
- Dani Houses (1974)

== See also ==
- Visual anthropology
- Seeing Anthropology written by Karl G. Heider
- Rashomon effect
