= The Great Mecca Feast =

1928 documentary film by George Krugers

- Title card
- Het Groote Mekka-Feest
- Directed by: George Krugers
- Cinematography: George Krugers
- Production company: Krugers Filmbedrijf
- Release date: 9 November 1928 (Netherlands)
- Running time: 72 minutes
- Country: Dutch East Indies
- Language: Silent film

The Great Mecca Feast (Dutch: Het Groote Mekka-Feest) is a 1928 silent documentary film by George Krugers. Divided into four acts, it opens with a group of Muslim men from the Dutch East Indies (modern-day Indonesia) beginning the Hajj pilgrimage, then showcases elements of everyday life and worship in the Hejaz region of the Arabian Peninsula – including the Hajj itself. As Mecca had long been closed to non-Muslims, Krugers passed as a Muslim and recorded film and still-photographic documentation of the pilgrimage. In this endeavour, he was supported by people in both the Dutch East Indies and the Hejaz.

Krugers intended for The Great Mecca Feast to be screened at the Paris Colonial Exposition. Although it was well-received upon its Dutch première on 9 November 1928, subsequent showings were rare and the film faded into obscurity. Described as the first documentary about the Hajj, the film is the only one of Krugers's works known to have survived. The Great Mecca Feast began receiving scholarly interest in the 2010s. Since then, it has been analysed within the context of colonial networks and control over the Hajj process, as well as a primary document providing insight into the experiences of contemporary pilgrims.

== Synopsis ==
The Great Mecca Feast consists of four acts: the journey from the Dutch East Indies (modern-day Indonesia), everyday life in Jeddah, the Hajj activities, and the return to the Dutch East Indies. It opens with a group of rural men in the Dutch East Indies who are buying tickets for their Hajj pilgrimage. They travel from Tanjung Priok to the Hejaz region of the Arabian Peninsula aboard the SS Madioen, stopping in Palembang to take on more passengers and in Sabang for medical examinations. After embarking more passengers at Perim Island, they reach Jeddah and disembark.

In Jeddah, the "harbour of Mecca", various elements of everyday life are seen, including the architecture, day labourers, and livestock. Also seen are pilgrims of various ethnicities, occupations, and socio-economic statuses. These pilgrims depart for Mecca, some on camelback and others on foot. They arrive in the city, and landmarks such as the Kaaba and the Zamzam Well are shown. As pilgrims line the road, King Ibn Saud arrives. The pilgrims do their Friday prayers, then circumambulate the Kaaba before running between the Safa and Marwa hills.

Animals are ritually slaughtered, and journeys to Arafat, Medina, and Mina are undertaken. Upon arriving at Muzdalifah, the pilgrims conduct their sunset and evening prayers. They then begin the ritual Stoning of the Devil in Mina, the city of tents. After the return to Mecca on the fifth day, the pilgrimage is complete. The pilgrims return to Jeddah and board a Royal Rotterdam Lloyd ship for the trip back to the Indies, and are seen off by Daniel van der Meulen, the Dutch consul to Jeddah.

== Production ==
Krugers in a scene from the film

The Great Mecca Feast was filmed and produced by George Krugers. It was his first production under the banner of Krugers Filmbedrijf, which he established after handling the cinematography on Loetoeng Kasaroeng (1926) and directing Eulis Atjih (1927) for the Java Film Company. He chose the Hajj pilgrimage as the subject matter; the scholar Rukayyah Reichling writes that Krugers must have recognized the commercial viability of such a project, as Westerners were curious about Mecca while few Muslims of the Dutch East Indies were able to afford the journey. Support may have come from the major shipping companies of the Indies, which were looking to legitimize their role in transporting pilgrims; by 1928, some 50,000 pilgrims from the Indies made the journey every year.

Mecca had been closed to non-Muslims for centuries; some non-Muslim Europeans had attempted to enter, but few succeeded. Krugers thus prepared himself to pass as a Muslim. He was circumcised and adopted the Muslim name Abdul Wahid. To better understand the pilgrimage process, he spoke with Agus Salim – a leading figure with the Sarekat Islam, an Islamic socio-political organization – and received a letter of recommendation to facilitate his entry. As with the Dutch Orientalist Christiaan Snouck Hurgronje before him, he may have professed to have embraced Islam, though this possibility is disputed by Krugers's family.

Filming for the documentary began in Bandung, West Java, on 3 February 1928. Using an Eyemo 35 mm camera from Bell & Howell, Krugers made the pilgrimage to Mecca via Jeddah aboard the Royal Rotterdam Lloyd's SS Madioen. Reichling suggests that he likely had a network of informants assisting him, providing information about good camera angles and local news. The local authorities were reportedly advised of the filming project, and the Dutch consul van der Meulen was extensively involved. At the same time, Krugers maintained his distance from some of the holy sites; the film scholar Sandeep Ray notes, for instance, that the Kaaba is only shown from a high vantage point, rather than a perspective amidst the crowd.

Krugers took numerous photographs of the Hajj while shooting the documentary. These included several portraits of pilgrims and views of the local people. He returned to Bandung on 8 July 1928 and edited the film there. He prepared 113 intertitles for the film, which spans four reels and has a duration of 72 minutes.

== Release and reception ==
The Great Mecca Feast

The Great Mecca Feast was shown in the Dutch East Indies as early as 17 August 1928, when it was screened at Decca Park in Batavia. Such screenings were unusual for documentaries produced in the Indies; Ray suggests that the only other film to receive similar theatrical showings was Willy Mullens's De Pest Op Java (The Plague in Java, 1926). Krugers began preparations for a European screening soon after. He and his family departed for the Netherlands on 12 September 1928, hoping that the film would gain sufficient recognition for screening at the 1931 Paris Colonial Exposition.

The documentary's European première was at the Stadsgehoorzaal in Leiden, the Netherlands, on 8 November 1928. This screening was attended by Dutch socialites including Princess Juliana, Minister of the Colonies Jacob Christiaan Koningsberger, and former Governor-General of the Dutch East Indies Alexander Idenburg. Many attendees were members of the Oriental Society in the Netherlands. The film was given an introduction by Christiaan Snouck Hurgronje, the leader of the Society, who highlighted the importance of the Hajj pilgrimage in Islam. Several photographs taken by Krugers were used as marketing material and the film was promoted by the Dutch government.

Newspaper reception of the film was generally positive, with much interest in the perceived "forbiddenness" of the site. One newspaper claimed:

[Passing as Muslim] gave the opportunity to make recordings of the saintly of the saints, whereby one can now see images which otherwise remain completely hidden from the non-Mohammadans... Upon discovery, he certainly would have received the death penalty.

Other elements of the film received praise. Het Vaderland highlighted the natural beauty of the Erythraean Sea and the film's views of Mecca. De Tijd reported that audiences followed the show with interest, and that Krugers had "turned everything into a nice whole". The Nieuwe Haarlemsche Courant emphasized the importance of Snouck Hurgronje's introduction, which it summarized in its review, for contextualizing the film. Several newspapers criticized the film's technical aspects, including its lighting and pacing, as well as perceived redundancies in its presentation.

== Legacy and analysis ==
The view of the Kaaba in the film; Krugers maintained his distance from several of the subjects.

The Great Mecca Feast has been identified as the first documentary film about the Hajj pilgrimage; previously, photographs had been taken by the Egyptian engineer Mohammad Sadiq Bay and by Snouck Hurgronje. It is the only one of Krugers's films not to be considered lost; (Note: According to Krugers's son Jan, the family left the Dutch East Indies in 1935, during the Great Depression. Krugers had hoped to sell his film equipment in Hong Kong, but this was unrealized, and his films were lost in the city (Woodrich 2018, pp. 10–11).) Krugers kept copies in Amsterdam, intending to use them as gifts, and these were donated to the EYE Film Institute Netherlands. Original nitrate reels are held at the Netherlands Institute for Sound and Vision in Hilversum.

Although The Great Mecca Feast soon faded into obscurity, sparse screenings continued into the 1930s. In 1933, it was announced that the film would be shown to academic audiences in the United Kingdom with an introduction by Snouck Hurgronje. On 26 December 1938, a screening at the Cinema Palace in Groningen was introduced by the Dutch doctor and traveller Pieter van der Hoog. Afterwards, no screenings are recorded. Academic mentions of the film are scarce, though The Great Mecca Feast began to gain recognition in 2015, when Krugers's son Jan was invited to discuss the film at Leiden University.

Reichling argues that, just as the governments in Krugers's time were positioning themselves as the "vigilant yet considerate guardians of the Hajj", Krugers's moving images bear a "colonial gaze" that drew from established networks of colonial actors and institutions. She notes several inaccuracies in the film's depiction of Hajj rituals, in particular the omission of important components: standing in prayer (wuquf) on the Day of Arafah, the communal Eid prayer, and the hair removal ritual, as well as the paucity of festive activities.

According to Ray, the film provides valuable insights into the experiences of Hajj pilgrims, including meeting Muslims from around the world. The film also shows elements of the pilgrimage that have since been phased out, such as the slaughtering of animals in front of pilgrims. Krugers's approach, he writes, "lends the film an intimate texture at times", allowing viewers insight into the pilgrimage. He notes that the film has limitations; Krugers maintained his distance from some of his subjects and failed to represent the experiences of women on the pilgrimage.

== Works cited ==
- Buskens, Léon; Kommers, Jean (15 June 2022). "Mekka as an Ethnographic Text: How Christiaan Snouck Hurgronje Lived and Constructed Daily Life in Arabia". In Léon Buskens; Jan Just Witkam; Annemarie van Sandwijk (eds.). Scholarship in Action: Essays on the Life and Work of Christiaan Snouck Hurgronje (1857–1936). The History of Oriental Studies. Vol. 12. Leiden: Brill. pp. 168–259. doi:10.1163/9789004513617_006. ISBN 978-90-04-51361-7.
- "'De Merapi Dreigt' en 'Mekka'" ['De Merapi Dreigt' and 'Mekka']. Nieuwsblad van het Noorden (in Dutch). Groningen. 24 December 1938. p. 2.
- "Film-Nieuws: Mekka Film" [Film News: Mecca Film]. Nieuwe Haarlemsche Courant (in Dutch). Haarlem. 9 November 1928. p. 8.
- "Filmnieuws: De Bedevaart naar Mekka en het Mekkaansche Feest" [Film News: The Pilgrimage to Mecca and the Meccan Festival]. Het Vaderland (in Dutch). 's-Gravenhage. 9 November 1928. p. C2.
- "Het Groote Mekka Feest". Leiden: Leiden University. 22 October 2021. Archived from the original on 5 December 2022.
- Koolhaas, Marnix; van de Vooren, Jurryt (15 October 2013). "Nederlandse Mekka-gangers: Snouck Hurgronje in 1885 en Krugers in 1928" [Dutch Mecca-Goers: Snouck Hurgronje in 1885 and Krugers in 1928] (in Dutch). Leiden: Nederland 24. Archived from the original on 1 February 2014.
- "Mekkafilm" [Mecca Film]. Het Vaderland (in Dutch). 's-Gravenhage. 15 February 1933. p. B3.
- Ray, Sandeep (2023). "What Did the Haji Jawa See in Mecca? A Film from 1928 as a Primary Source". Historical Journal of Film, Radio & Television. 43 (4): 1023–1049. doi:10.1080/01439685.2023.2193044.
- Reichling, Rukayyah (2022). "A Colonial Gaze on Mecca: Networks Surrounding the First Documentary about the Hajj". Journal of Material Cultures in the Muslim World. 3: 243–366. doi:10.1163/26666286-12340033.
- "Wetenschappen: De Mekka-Bedevaart Film" [Sciences: The Mecca-Pilgrimage Film]. De Tijd (in Dutch). 's-Hertogenbosch. 9 November 1928. p. 2.
- Woodrich, Christopher A. (2018). Ekranisasi Awal: Bringing Novels to the Silver Screen in the Dutch East Indies. Yogyakarta: Gadjah Mada University Press. ISBN 978-602-386-262-7.
