= Kamandaka (train) =

Passenger train service in Indonesia

Overview
- Service type: Agglomeration rail
- Status: Operational
- First service: 17 February 2014
- Current operator: Kereta Api Indonesia

Route
- Termini: Cilacap; Semarang Tawang
- Distance travelled: 244 km (151 mil) (Semarang Tawang—Purwokerto); 305 km (189 mil) (Semarang Tawang–Purwokerto–Cilacap)
- Average journey time: 4 hours 19 minutes (Semarang Tawang–Purwokerto); 6 hours 21 minutes (Semarang Tawang–Purwokerto–Cilacap)
- Service frequency: daily each way
- Train numbers: 181–184, 190–191 (for Semarang–Purwokerto); 194–199 (for Semarang-Kroya-Cilacap)

On-board services
- Classes: executive & economy
- Catering facilities: snack, food, & drink service

Technical
- Rolling stock: CC206/CC203/CC201
- Track gauge: 1067 mm
- Operating speed: 70 - 100 km/h (43 - 62 mph)
Kamandaka train map
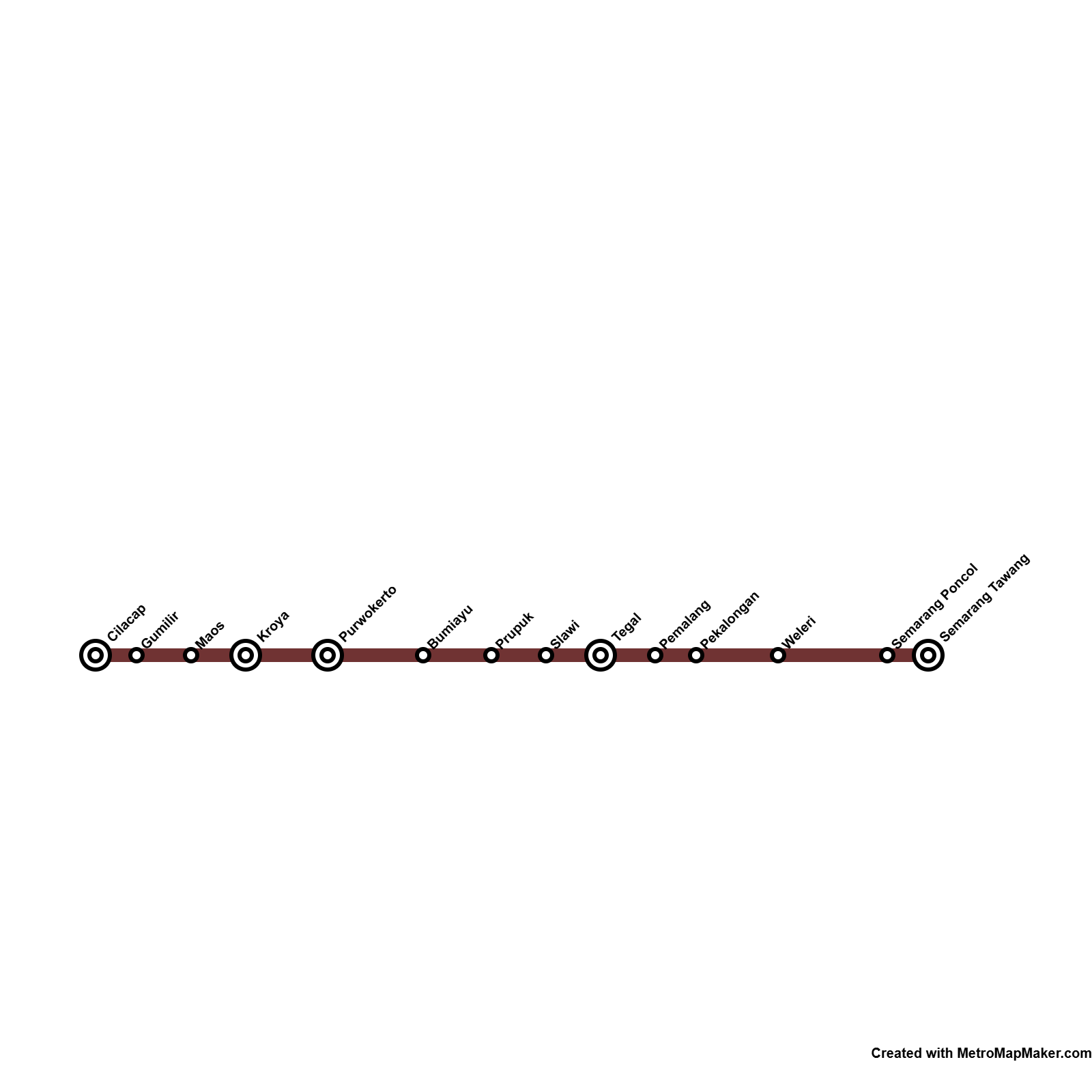

Kamandaka is a passenger train service in Indonesia operated by Kereta Api Indonesia, between Semarang Tawang and Cilacap via Tegal, Purwokerto, and Kroya. The service began operations on 17 February 2014.

== Branding ==
The name "Kamandaka" is taken from one of the legendary figures from Banyumas, Raden Kamandaka. In the story of Ketoprak, he is known as Lutung Kasarung, which is different from the legend of Tanah Pasundan which is inspired by the story of the menak of Galuh Kingdom and Sunda Kingdom about the journey of Sanghyang Guruminda from Kahyangan who was sent down to Buana Panca Tengah (Earth) in the form of a lutung (a type of monkey).

== History ==
The Kamandaka train was inaugurated by the Deputy Minister of Transportation, Bambang Susantono, and the Governor of Central Java, Ganjar Pranowo, on 17 February 2014. The number of train trips was increased to three round trips a day starting 19 December 2014.

With the induction of the Joglosemarkerto train service, the Kamandaka train service (together with the Joglokerto train) was removed on 1 December 2018. 2 months later, PT KAI resumed operations on 1 February 2019 to serve customers on the Semarang–Purwokerto route.

== Railway line ==
The Kamandaka train operation utilizes the Tegal–Prupuk railway line, previously only used for boiler train services from Maos to Tegal Station. The last passenger train to run on this line was the Mahesa train, from Semarang Tawang Station to Bandung Station, which was discontinued in the 2000s. In 2009, the Kaligung train served the Semarang–Slawi Station route. However, the train's route was shortened to Tegal due to low passenger occupancy rates.

To meet the demand of the Cilacap community to travel to Semarang by train, PT KAI Operation Area V Purwokerto opened the Kamandaka train service with the Semarang Tawang–Cilacap route on 11 March 2022.

== Train sets ==
Initially, the Kamandaka train operated using economy-class trains with 106 seats per car. Subsequently, it operated using former Menoreh and Ambarawa Ekspres trains with economy-class plus service (80 seats per car) starting 23 February 2017.

The Kamandaka train service was supplemented with executive class starting 1 April 2017.

As of 11 March 2022, the Kamandaka train uses two types of train sets. For the Semarang Tawang - Purwokerto route, the Kamandaka train uses executive and economy class train sets, plus those from the Purwokerto and Solo Balapan train depots. Meanwhile, for the Semarang Tawang - Cilacap route, the Kamandaka train uses the 2016 New Image Economy class train sets, which were later expanded with executive class services.

Starting 15 December 2024, the Kamandaka train, the Joglosemarkerto train, and the Banyubiru train (train numbers 208-209) will use the latest generation of modified economy class train sets, derived from the Gayabaru Malam Selatan train and the Jaka Tingkir train. These two trains have been fitted with new stainless steel train sets manufactured by PT INKA Madiun. The latest generation of economy class trains is the result of modifications by Balai Yasa Manggarai from the previous series with a reduction in the number of seats from 80 to 72.

== Stations ==
- Semarang Tawang (Terminus)
- Semarang Poncol
- Weleri
- Pekalongan
- Pemalang
- Tegal
- Slawi
- Prupuk
- Bumiayu
- Purwokerto
- Kroya
- Maos
- Gumilir
- Cilacap (Terminus)

== Incidents ==
- 26 July 2015, PT KAI officers from Operation Area V Purwokerto arrested primary school students who threw stones at the Kamandaka train at km 313+2/3 (the section between Bumiayu to Kretek Station).
