= Pieter van der Hoog =

Dutch physician and writer (1888–1957)

- Van der Hoog (left) during the hajj
- Born: Pieter Henricus van der Hoog; 17 August 1888; The Hague, Netherlands
- Died: 16 April 1957 (aged 68); The Hague, Netherlands
- Other names: Mohammed Abdul-Ali
- Occupations: Bacteriologist, dermatologist, Islamicist
- Notable work: Pelgrims naar Mekka (Pilgrims in Mecca)

Pieter Henricus van der Hoog (17 August 1888 – 16 April 1957), also known after converting to Islam as Mohammed Abdul-Ali, was a Dutch bacteriologist, dermatologist, and Islamicist. Born in The Hague, Van der Hoog was pressured by his father to enter the Dutch military, for which he served as a doctor. During his time with the Royal Netherlands East Indies Army in the Dutch East Indies from 1913 through 1921, he practised in several areas but was censured and arrested. Returning to the Netherlands, he earned a doctoral degree from the University of Leiden in 1922. After some time practising medicine in the Netherlands, in 1926 he was sent to Curaçao; he was ultimately blacklisted by the Ministry of the Colonies for his continued attacks on the Governor of the Netherlands Antilles.

In 1928, Van der Hoog was invited to lead a team of Egyptian and Syrian doctors in Jeddah, Saudi Arabia. He proved popular in the position, despite the hardships, though this was undermined by his sudden conversion to Islam. After being refused entry to Mecca by King Ibn Saud and falling ill, Van der Hoog returned to the Netherlands. Two years later, having learned Arabic and memorized parts of the Qur'an, Van der Hoog received permission to undertake the hajj pilgrimage. Upon returning to the Netherlands, he wrote about his experiences in the 1935 travelogue Pelgrims naar Mekka (Pilgrims in Mecca) and delivered a series of lectures on Islam. Van der Hoog continued to practice in the Netherlands; he also established the Dr. van der Hoog brand of cosmetics.

== Early life ==
Van der Hoog was born in The Hague on 17 August 1888, the second child of a Dutch general. Despite initially wanting to be a painter, he was compelled to follow his father's footsteps and enter the military. He decided to become a doctor for the Royal Netherlands East Indies Army, completing his preliminary exam in 1907. After four years of studies, which included time as editor-in-chief of the school newspaper, in 1911 he completed his graduate exam. The following year, he received his first certification, and in 1913 he gained the title of medical doctor.

After graduating, Van der Hoog was appointed an Officer of Health in the Royal Netherlands East Indies Army. He departed for the Dutch East Indies in August of that year aboard the steamship Rembrandt for his first position in the Civil Medical Service in Batavia (now Jakarta); he later took a position in Situbondo in eastern Java. During this period, he wrote extensively, becoming known for what the Dutch consul Daniel van der Meulen deemed a "malicious pen".

In March 1915, after one article that heavily criticized the officers' union was published in the Bataviaasch Nieuwsblad, Van der Hoog was transferred to a remote camp in Dutch Borneo. He soon came into conflict with the captain, whom he had declared insane and locked in a room. He then instructed a guard to put the captain in irons. After fleeing the camp, Van der Hoog was arrested, though by 1916 he was again practising medicine in South Kalimantan among the Dayak people. Ultimately, facilitated by his father's friends, Van der Hoog left the military. He returned to the Netherlands in 1921.

== Itinerant practice ==
After some time in Vienna, Paris, Strasbourg, and Berlin, Van der Hoog enroled at the University of Leiden. In 1922 he defended De Bestrijding der Geslachtsziekten (The Fight Against Venereal Diseases), a doctoral thesis on sexually transmitted diseases that had been supervised by Paul Christiaan Flu. He opened a private practice in the Netherlands, but frequently left for sea as ship's doctor. He is also recorded as having practised in Dutch Guinea, near the French penal colony of Devil's Island, where he provided assistance to escaped convicts.

In February 1926, Van der Hoog was dispatched to Curaçao in the Dutch Caribbean to serve as the chief medical officer of the Public Health Service. In this capacity, he promoted improved water hygiene, but also clashed with the Governor of the Netherlands Antilles, whom he decried as a dictator. In October 1926, he resigned from his position and returned to the Netherlands, though his continued criticism of the governor resulted in him being blacklisted by the Ministry of the Colonies.

== First period in the Middle East ==
In 1928, Van der Hoog was asked to travel to Jeddah in the Hejaz to lead a team of Egyptian and Syrian doctors. He quickly accepted the invitation, seeking to leave the routine of his Dutch life in favour of new adventures. He arrived in September, the Ministry of Foreign Affairs not having discussed his employment with the Ministry of the Colonies. After the latter expressed its concern with Van der Hoog's temperament, "warning [Van der Meulen] of the adder [he] might be clasping to [his] breast", the consul spoke with the doctor and deemed him well-suited for the task.

Van der Hoog was tasked with research and vaccine preparation at a Jeddah hospital. Often tasked with treating soldiers, policemen, and civil servants, van der Hoog later described the experience as miserable. He later recalled the streets being filled with oppressive black clouds of flies, swarms of stray cats eating amidst piles of feces, and having only a bowl and rusted medical instruments to practice. He became concerned with the prevalence of water-borne illnesses, especially given the limited access to water in the area.

As he remained in the Hejaz, Van der Hoog became interested in Mecca and the purported healing benefits of water from the Zamzam Well. He was unable to obtain a sample personally, as the city was closed for non-Muslims, but samples obtained through an assistant showed lower microbial concentrations than water collected from the canal of Zubaidah. He soon converted to Islam, which Van der Meulen attributed to his desire to learn about the well as well as to find material for publication in the Dutch press. This conversion was poorly received by both the Christian and Muslim residents of Jeddah, in part due to its perceived suddenness, and Van der Hoog was ostracized. The issue received coverage as far afield as the Dutch East Indies, where the Soerabaijasch Handelsblad speculated that he had simply professed conversion to gain access to Mecca.

Desiring nonetheless to travel to Mecca, Van der Hoog wrote to King Ibn Saud to announce his conversion and request permission to enter the holy city. In his response, Ibn Saud congratulated Van der Hoog on his conversion, but required of him, "Accomplish your duty and be faithful in performing the prescribed five daily prayers in one of the mosques in Jedda. And when you have lived a year as a devout Muslim, then come and perform your duties as a pilgrim to the Holy Shrine in Mecca."

== Return to the Netherlands ==
Van der Hoog fell ill soon after, with a high fever and a weakened heart. He returned to Leiden to resume his medical practice, having spent only six months in the Hejaz. In a conversation with Van der Meulen, he professed that "he had never been a sincere Christian; if he could become a sincere Muslim it would be a change for the better."

While practising medicine in the Netherlands and contributing to Het Vaderland, Van der Hoog began to study Arabic and memorize portions of the Qur'an. After two years, he again wrote to Ibn Saud, declaring his continued faith. He later argued that "he had toiled, worked hard, and fought" to dedicate himself to the religion. The king welcomed him to return to Saudi Arabia and serve as his personal doctor, as well as to undertake the hajj pilgrimage.

== Hajj ==
Van der Hoog thereby travelled to Saudi Arabia in 1930, boarding a steamer in Egypt for Jeddah. In the harbour, he saw the wreck of the Fabre Line's SS Asia, which had been destroyed by fire in May, before disembarking and being met by his colleague Said Hossein al-Attas. After treating some patients and visiting a Christian cemetery, he continued to Mecca along the Medina road.

In Mecca, Van der Hoog performed the prescribed rituals of the hajj, entering Masjid al-Haram, circumambulating the Kaaba, and drinking from the Zamzam Well. He attended several gatherings, meeting Faisal of Saudi Arabia at a madrasa and attending a reception at the Royal Palace hosted by Ibn Saud. In the medical arena, he visited the Egyptian hospice. He also delivered a child for his friend Qāsim al-Khalīl, receiving a piece of the kiswah (black cloth covering the Kaaba) in return.

These experiences were compiled in Pelgrims naar Mekka (Pilgrims in Mecca), a travelogue published by H. P. Leopold in 1935. Regarding his decision to publish his experience, Van der Hoog cited three goals: to provide a generalized overview of people from throughout the Muslim world who partook in the hajj; to highlight the dangers of dysentery, typhus, and cholera, that affected the pilgrimage; and to provide "a purely personal account of a man who saw himself reaching the peak of his life and career, but had a sudden feeling that his accumulated experiences, knowledge and understanding throughout the years were not enough for him."

== Later life and death ==
Van der Hoog returned to the Netherlands in 1935, and published accounts of his experiences both in the press and in Pelgrims naar Mekka. He became popular as a lecturer, frequently speaking about Islam at the People's University of Leiden and introducing George Krugers' film The Great Mecca Feast during screenings. He published several books, including a biography of Avicenna that was well received. Later in life, Van der Hoog rarely discussed his hajj experiences, and his daughter recalled that, though he retained faith in Islam's understanding of God, he was no longer a practising Muslim. Van der Hoog did, however, donate money for the construction of Mubarak Mosque, The Hague, the first purpose-built mosque in the country.

While continuing to practice medicine, he also developed beauty treatments and gained a reputation as a dermatologist. In 1935, he established Dr. van der Hoog, a cosmetics company; the company has become one of the most famous Dutch cosmetics brands. Van der Hoog continued to travel frequently. In 1957, he journeyed to Mallorca in the Mediterranean. Shortly after returning to the Netherlands, he suffered from a heart attack. He died on 16 April 1957, aged 68. It was announced that he would be buried at the Rhijnhof cemetery near Leiden.

== Personal life ==
Van der Hoog married Annie P.L. Brandon Bravo in 1914; the couple had two sons. After her death, he married a woman he had met in Saudi Arabia. The couple had four children.

== Works cited ==
- "Dr. P. H. van der Hoog Overleden" [Dr. P. H. van der Hoog Dies]. Het Vaderland (in Dutch). 's-Gravenhage. 18 April 1957. p. 6.
- "Over Dr. Van der Hoog" [About Dr. Van der Hoog] (in Dutch). Dr. Van der Hoog. Archived from the original on 22 February 2026.
- Ryad, Umar (2017). "On his Donkey to the Mountain of ʿArafāt: Dr. Van der Hoog and his Hajj Journey to Mecca". The Hajj and Europe in the Age of Empire. Leiden Studies in Islam and Society. Vol. 5. Leiden: Brill. pp. 185–216. doi:10.1163/9789004323353_009. ISBN 978-90-04-32335-3.
- van der Meulen, Daniel (1961). Faces in Shem. London: John Murray. OCLC 1526786.
