= Daniel van der Meulen =

Dutch diplomat (1894–1989)

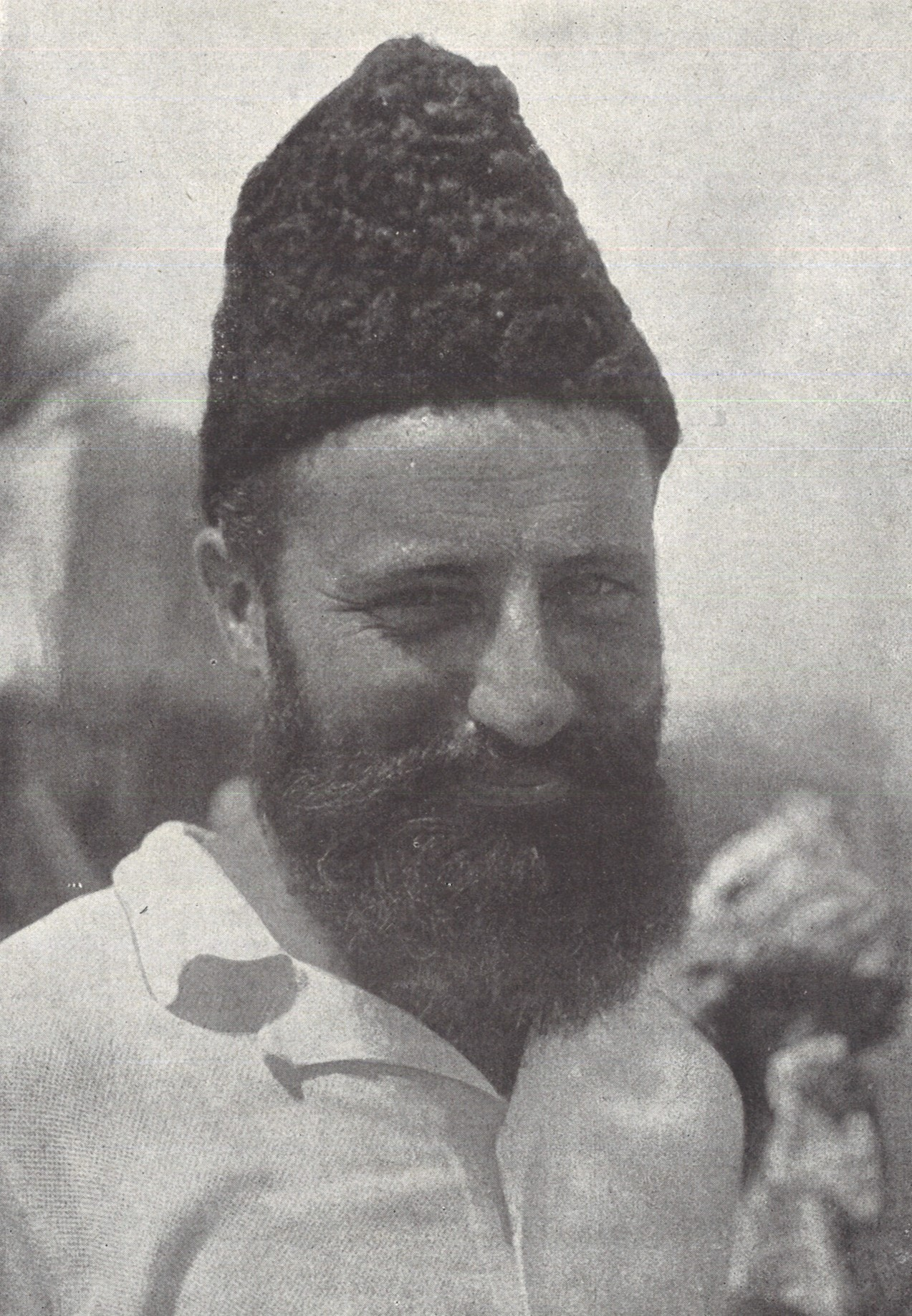
- Born: 4 September 1894; Laren, North Holland, Netherlands
- Died: 24 September 1989 (aged 95); Gorssel, Gelderland, Netherlands
- Occupation: Civil servant
- Known for: Consul to Jeddah (1926–1931)

Daniel van der Meulen (4 September 1894 – 24 September 1989) was a Dutch civil servant who served as the consul to Jeddah from 1926 through 1931. Born in Laren, van der Meulen entered the civil service and was assigned to the Dutch East Indies in 1915. He was chosen by the Islamicist Christiaan Snouck Hurgronje to serve as the Netherlands' consul in Jeddah, focusing mainly on facilitating the hajj pilgrimage for residents of the Dutch East Indies. After his time as consul ended, van der Meulen returned to the Indies, though he made several further trips to the Arabian Peninsula. He maintained diplomatic roles in Jeddah during the Second World War and in Jakarta during the Indonesian National Revolution.

== Early life and consular career ==
Van der Meulen was born in Laren, North Holland, on 4 September 1894. He entered the Dutch civil service in 1915, spending some time stationed among the Batak people of northern Sumatra in the Dutch East Indies.

Van der Meulen was later selected by the Islamicist Christiaan Snouck Hurgronje to serve as the Netherlands' consul in Jeddah. In preparation for the assignment, van der Meulen was educated in the teachings of Islam and the Arabic language by Snouck Hurgronje. He arrived in Saudi Arabia in 1926. Despite the title of consul, writing in 1961, van der Meulen recalled having few consular duties. Rather, his main duty was facilitating the hajj pilgrimage for residents of the Dutch East Indies.

Van der Meulen's other duties in Jeddah were varied. He helped coordinate a Dutch–Saudi response to health crises in the region, working with the Dutch doctor Pieter van der Hoog. He facilitated the filming of George Krugers's 1928 documentary The Great Mecca Feast, appearing towards the end of the film on a ship transporting pilgrims. In his memoir, he also recalled being tasked with identifying members of the burgeoning Indonesian nationalist movement who were fleeing to the Hejaz to escape prosecution in the Indies, requesting extradition from King Ibn Saud, and returning them to the Indies for internment. Van der Meulen remained consul through 1931.

== Later life ==
After completing his term as consul in Jeddah, van der Meulen returned to the Indies. However, he also undertook several trips through the Arabian Peninsula. In 1931, he undertook a trip to the Yemeni Imamate via Hodeidah and Sanaa to establish a treaty with the Yemeni government. That year, he also accompanied the German geographer Hermann von Wissmann to the Hadhramaut to chart the region. Another trip with Wissman was undertaken in 1939, this time to identify new routes while simultaneously collecting archaeological, botanical, and geological data. The second trip required them to pay for protective escorts from local warlords.

In 1941, during the Second World War, the Dutch government-in-exile dispatched van der Meulen to Jeddah, tasking him with preventing Arab rulers from supporting Nazi Germany. He remained in this position, which also required him to facilitate the few hajj pilgrims entering the region, until 1945. In this capacity, he undertook another trip to the Hadhramaut, seeking information on the consequences of the Japanese occupation government's ban on people in the Indies sending money to the region. At war's end, van der Meulen returned to the Indies amidst the Indonesian National Revolution. He participated in numerous discussions, including the Malino Conference. In his memoir, van der Meulen characterized the Dutch response as divided, with representatives in Jakarta more interested in a compromise than those back in the Netherlands.

Van der Meulen was the focus of a 1961 episode of Silhouet, a series of biographical documentaries produced by the Katholieke Radio Omroep. In 1977, he published Hoort Gij de Donder Niet? (Do You Hear the Thunder?), a history of his experiences in the Dutch East Indies and Saudi Arabia. Van der Meulen died on 24 September 1989. A memorial service was announced for the Reformed Church in Eefde, with burial in the public cemetery in Gorssel to follow.

== Legacy ==
Van der Meulen was a member of the Royal Netherlands Academy of Arts and Sciences from 1947 until his resignation in 1955. In 1947, he was granted the Patron's Medal by the Royal Geographical Society for his travels in the Hadhramaut and documentation of Saudi Arabia. Van der Meulen was also an officer in the Order of Orange-Nassau.

Van der Meulen took numerous photographs of the Arabian Peninsula. These were exhibited at a 1995 exhibition at the Tropenmuseum in Amsterdam. In 2003, a collection of photographs taken by van der Meulen during his journeys to Yemen was compiled by Steven Vink and published as Daniel van der Meulen in Arabia Felix. Travels and Photographs of a Dutch Diplomat in Yemen, 1931–1944. This book, 128 pages in length, contains approximately a hundred photographs of the region. Most photographs focus on landscapes and towns, including the wadis and adobe architecture of the region. Several photographs depict people, including the Jewish minority of Sanaa, as well as prominent leaders in al-Quwairah and Seiyun.

== Works cited ==
- Amelink, Agnes (14 January 1995). "Diplomaat en Ontdekkingsreiziger Fotografeerde Het Pure Arabië" [Diplomat and Explorer Photographed Pure Arabia]. Trouw (in Dutch). Meppel. p. 4.
- "D. v. d. Meulen in 'Silhouet'". De Nieuwe Limburger (in Dutch). Maastricht. 21 July 1961. p. 17.
- "D. van der Meulen (1894–1989)" (in Dutch). Royal Netherlands Academy of Arts and Sciences. Archived from the original on 22 February 2026.
- de Jong, Huub (2004). "Book Reviews". Asian Journal of Social Science. 32 (3): 530–533. doi:10.1163/1568531043584818.
- "Familiebericht" [Family News]. Trouw (in Dutch). Meppel. 26 September 1989. p. 8.
- "Medals and Awards" (PDF). Royal Geographic Society. 2025. Archived from the original (PDF) on 22 February 2026.
- Morrien, Joop (30 December 1977). "Een AR-Indisch Ambtenaar die Zich Bekwaamde in de Islam" [An Indies' Administrator Schooled in Islam]. De Waarheid (in Dutch). Amsterdam. p. 5.
- Reichling, Rukayyah (2022). "A Colonial Gaze on Mecca: Networks Surrounding the First Documentary about the Hajj". Journal of Material Cultures in the Muslim World. 3: 243–366.
- Ryad, Umar (2017). "On his Donkey to the Mountain of ʿArafāt: Dr. Van der Hoog and his Hajj Journey to Mecca". The Hajj and Europe in the Age of Empire. Leiden Studies in Islam and Society. Vol. 5. Leiden: Brill. pp. 185–216. doi:10.1163/9789004323353_009. ISBN 978-90-04-32335-3.
- van der Meulen, Daniel (1961). Faces in Shem. London: John Murray. OCLC 1526786.
