= Karnadi Anemer Bangkong =

1930 film directed by George Krugers

- Directed by: George Krugers
- Story by: Joehana; Sukria
- Based on: Rasiah Nu Goreng Patut (Karnadi Anemer Bangkong) by Joehana and Sukria
- Produced by: George Krugers
- Production company: Krugers-Filmbedrijf
- Release date: 1930 (Dutch East Indies)
- Country: Dutch East Indies

Karnadi Anemer Bangkong (Karnadi the Frog Contractor; also known as Karnadi Tangkep Bangkong, meaning Karnadi Catches Frogs) is a 1930 comedy from the Dutch East Indies directed by George Krugers. It is considered the country's first talkie, although parts were silent and the sound quality was poor. Based on a popular Sundanese novel, the film was considered controversial by the native audience.

== Premise ==
Karnadi is a young Sundanese frog chaser who enjoys eating the frogs he catches. He later takes the identity of a rich man and tries to adapt to the latter's surroundings, but is eventually discovered.

== Production ==
Karnadi Anemer Bangkong was directed by George Krugers, who had worked on the Dutch East Indies' first domestic production, Loetoeng Kasaroeng, in 1926. The story was adapted from the best-selling novel Roesia nu Goreng Patut, written by the Sundanese authors Joehana and Sukria. Krugers had previously adapted another of Joehana's works, Eulis Atjih, in 1928.

The film was released shortly after the first talkies shown in the Indies, Fox Movietone Follies of 1929 and The Rainbow Man (both 1929), were released. Attempting to capture this new technology, Krugers used a single system camera that he had obtained with the help of his Society of Motion Picture and Television Engineers membership. Krugers was unable to record all of the dialogue necessary for the film, so some parts used intertitles; thus, the film was a part-talkie.

== Release and reception ==
The release title of Karnadi Anemer Bangkong is uncertain; the title Karnadi Anemer Bangkong has been used based on a 1970s newspaper article by M. Enoh, written from memory. The film scholar Christopher Woodrich, noting that a sound film by Krugers with a similar plot was advertised in 1930, suggests that the film was originally released as Roesia Gadis Priangan (The Secret of the Girl from Priangan). The film was reportedly poorly received by the majority Sundanese audience, possibly because of Karnadi's fondness for frog meat (which is forbidden for Muslims). The film's poor reception led Krugers to abandon independent filmmaking, joining Tan's Film for two productions before leaving the country in 1936.

The production is likely a lost film. The American visual anthropologist Karl G. Heider writes that all Indonesian films from before 1950 are lost. However, JB Kristanto's Katalog Film Indonesia (Indonesian Film Catalogue) records several as having survived at Sinematek Indonesia's archives, and Biran writes that several Japanese propaganda films have survived at the Netherlands Government Information Service.

The film is generally considered the first domestically produced talkie in the Indies. (Note: Some, like Suryadinata (1995, p. 43), write that The Teng Chun's 1931 production Boenga Roos dari Tjikembang was first, while Biran (2009, p. 137) suggests that The's film was released after the Wong brothers' Indonesia Malaise, and therefore well after Karnadi Anemer Bangkong.) However, other talkies soon followed: the Wong brothers' Indonesia Malaise (1931), for example, was released the following year and placed greater emphasis on sound. These early films had poor sound and much static, but through repeated experimentation the quality was eventually brought to acceptable levels.
