= Sandiwara =

Indonesian folk theatre

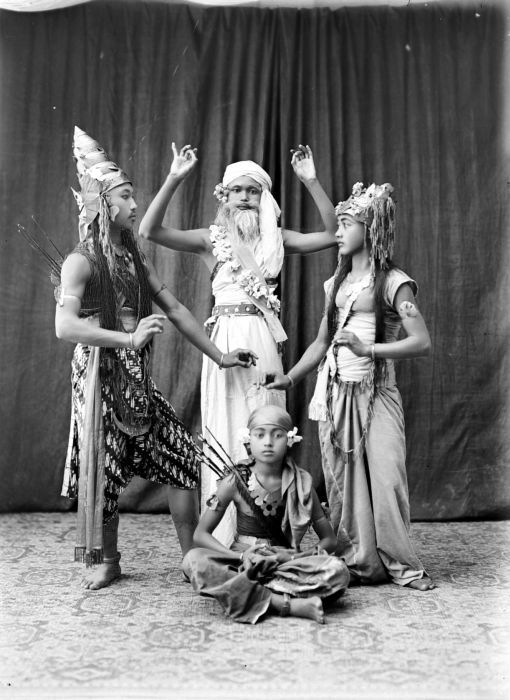
- playing Sakuntala circa 1920
- Native name: ꦭꦏꦺꦴꦤ꧀ (Javanese) ᮞᮔ᮪ᮓᮤᮝᮛ (Sundanese); Seni Sandiwara (Indonesian)
- Instrument(s): Gamelan, Kendhang, Suling
- Origin: Indonesia

Sandiwara (Indonesian term for "drama") is a genre of traditional theatrical drama of Indonesia. In general, it refers to any kind of drama or theatrical performance, and literally, sandiwara means "to pretend" or "to act". However, the term is often used to describe a genre of traditional drama of West Java. Sandiwara Sunda is a type of sandiwara performed in Sundanese and presenting Sundanese themes, folklores and stories. It is quite similar to Javanese ketoprak or wayang orang.

Today, this traditional drama has become less popular. Many sandiwara troupes are struggling to survive, including the once famous Sandiwara Miss Tjitjih.

== Form ==
Sandiwara might be accompanied by a live traditional gamelan degung orchestra, a modern electric organ and guitar, or recorded music. Sometimes traditional tembang Sunda and jaipongan dance interludes are included during the play. The play is usually presented in Sundanese, Indonesian, or Cirebon dialect. Some thriving local sandiwara troupes can be found in the town of Indramayu, West Java, where it is a popular form of traditional entertainment. A notable sandiwara troupe is Miss Tjitjih, established in Batavia, Dutch East Indies back in 1928.

== Theme ==
Unlike the European-influenced toneel that often adapt Western themes and adaptation of foreign plays, sandiwara is mostly derived from local sources; including folklore such as "Sangkuriang" and "Lutung Kasarung", epic stories such as "King Siliwangi of Pajajaran", local Sundanese comedy such as "Kabayan" to local horror stories and urban legends such as "Si Manis Jembatan Ancol" to "Beranak dalam Kubur" retelling the legend of demonic female spirit Kuntilanak.

== Toneel ==
Toneel
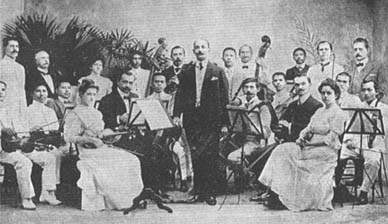
- Toneel Braga musical drama group circa 1910
- Originating culture: Indonesia

Toneel (Dutch word for: "theatre") is a genre of theatrical drama performance developed in early 20th-century Dutch East Indies (modern-day Indonesia). Compared to earlier native musical dramas, such as the Malay bangsawan and Komedie Stamboel, toneel adapted more European stylings, with an emphasis on spoken dialogue and a reduction in the amount of music used during the performance; thus the genre is called toneel, an adaptation of the Dutch word for theatre.

One of the notable toneel troupe is Dardanella that gained popularity in East Indies back in the 1920s. The play is presented in Malay and often featured themes and adaptations derived from popular Hollywood productions for the stage, including The Mark of Zorro, The Three Musketeers and The Thief of Bagdad. The toneel drama later influenced the development of film industry in the Dutch East Indies, and also influenced native Indonesian musical dramatic forms such as sandiwara, lenong, and ludruk.

== See also ==
- Ronggeng
- Bangsawan
- Javanese culture
- Balinese culture
