= Indonesia Malaise =

1931 film

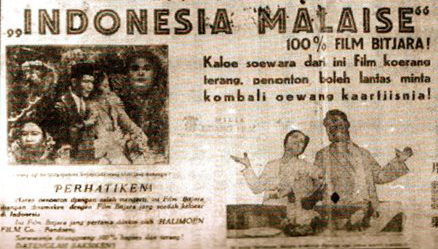
- Advertisement
- Directed by: Wong brothers
- Starring: Oemar; MS Ferry
- Cinematography: Wong brothers
- Production company: Halimoen Film
- Release date: 1931 (Dutch East Indies)
- Country: Dutch East Indies
- Language: Malay

Indonesia Malaise is a 1931 film directed by the Wong brothers. It was the brothers' first sound film and one of the first such films in the Dutch East Indies. Billed as a comedy, the story follows a woman who is overcome by tragedy in her personal life. A commercial failure, it may be lost.

== Plot ==
A woman is forced to marry a man she does not love instead of her current boyfriend. The marriage goes poorly, as her husband leaves her, their child dies, and her lover is imprisoned. She falls ill but is eventually healed by a man's singing. Meanwhile, a comedian romances a housemaid.

== Production ==
Indonesia Malaise was directed by the Wong brothers (Nelson, Joshua, and Othniel), ethnic Chinese who had studied film in the US. They also handled the cinematography and sound editing, using a single-system camera made in Europe and lent from a Bandung-based operator. Like the Wongs' other films, Indonesia Malaise was primarily targeted at lower-class native audiences. Only two of its cast members' names are recorded, MS Ferry and Oemar. The leading lady may have been a stage actress; the reporter Mohammad Enoh, who viewed Indonesia Malaise as a child, wrote in 1976 that she had been fairly attractive.

The film was among the first sound films released in the Indies, and the brothers' first sound film. The first such film, George Krugers' Karnadi Anemer Bangkong had been released the preceding year; The Teng Chun had followed with Boenga Roos dari Tjikembang (Rose from Cikembang) in 1931, although whether it preceded Indonesia Malaise is not certain. These early films had poor sound and much static, but through repeated experimentation the quality was eventually brought to acceptable levels.

The film has also the particularity of being the first in history to have the word "Indonesia" in its title.

== Release and reception ==
Indonesia Malaise was released in 1931 and was advertised as a film which would "surely make viewers laugh" ("Penonton tentoe misti ketawa"). It was preceded in screenings by M. H. Schilling's Dutch-oriented comedy Sinjo Tjo Main di Film; this is likely to have been an effort to draw Dutch audiences as well.

The film performed poorly, perhaps because audiences did not want a reminder of the ongoing Great Depression. The Wongs' studio, Halimoen Film, produced only one more film before closing: that film, Zuster Theresia (1932), was made on contract.

The film is likely lost. The American visual anthropologist Karl G. Heider writes that all Indonesian films from before 1950 are lost. However, JB Kristanto's Katalog Film Indonesia (Indonesian Film Catalogue) records several as having survived at Sinematek Indonesia's archives, and Biran writes that several Japanese propaganda films have survived at the Netherlands Government Information Service.

== Works cited ==
- Biran, Misbach Yusa (2009). Sejarah Film 1900–1950: Bikin Film di Jawa [History of Film 1900–1950: Making Films in Java] (in Indonesian). Jakarta: Komunitas Bamboo working with the Jakarta Art Council. ISBN 978-979-3731-58-2.
- Heider, Karl G (1991). Indonesian Cinema: National Culture on Screen. Honolulu: University of Hawaii Press. ISBN 978-0-8248-1367-3.
- "Indonesia Malaise". filmindonesia.or.id (in Indonesian). Jakarta: Konfidan Foundation. Archived from the original on 2 December 2013.
