= Joehana =

Indonesian writer (fl 1923-1930)

Akhmad Bassah
- Sketch of Joehana, undated
- Born: Akhmad Bassah c. 1895; Bandung, Dutch East Indies
- Died: c. 1930 (aged 34–35); Tasikmalaya, Dutch East Indies
- Education: Meer Uitgebreid Lager Onderwijs
- Occupations: Novelist, dramatist, reporter
- Writing career
- Pen name: Joehana
- Period: 1923–1930
- Genres: Realist; Drama; Romance; Folklore

Akhmad Bassah (also Bassakh; [axˈmad baˈsax]; fl. 1923–30), best known by the pen name Joehana ([juˈhana]; Perfected Spelling: Yuhana), was an author from the Dutch East Indies who wrote in Sundanese. He worked for a time on the railroad before becoming an author by 1923, and had a strong interest in social welfare; this interest influenced his novels. He was also a productive translator, dramatist, and reporter, and operated a company which offered writing services. Sources disagree when Joehana died; some offer 1930, while others give 1942–45.

During the seven years in which he was active, Joehana wrote a number of stories and articles, as well as several novels. The years of publication are generally unclear, as reprints included neither the year of first publication nor the printing number. Stylistically, Joehana has been classified as a realist owing to his use of the names of actual locations and products in his works, as well as the predominantly vernacular Sundanese in his novels. However, influences from traditional theatrical forms such as wayang and literature such as pantun are evident. Joehana's works cover a wide range of themes, although in general they are oriented towards social criticism and promote modernization.

Though Joehana's works were published independently, they were popular in the Bandung area where they were sold. Local businesses may have offered funds for product placement, and Joehana's works were adapted to the stage and film. However, they received little academic attention until the 1960s, and critical consensus since then has been negative. Two of his works have been republished since the 1960s, and stage productions of his novel Rasiah nu Goreng Patut continued into the 1980s.

== Biography ==
It is uncertain when Akhmad Bassah was born, though he is thought to have been raised in Bandung, western Java, where he graduated from a Meer Uitgebreid Lager Onderwijs. Bassah spent time working on the state-operated railroad, apparently rising to a fairly high position, but was fired for organizing a strike of the Union of Train and Tramway Personnel. Although he left the company, Bassah remained active in social movements. He was an active member of the Sarekat Rakyat (People's Union), an organization with communist leanings, and helped that group in its mission of social service.

Through contemporary reports it is clear that by 1923 Bassah had begun to make a name as a writer, and that he had also become active in the theatre and as a journalist. Bassah signed his writings "Joehana", taken from the name of his adoptive daughter; he is best remembered by that pen name. Although he was married to a schoolteacher named Atikah, they had no biological children.

Throughout his writing career, Joehana wrote independently, unattached to any publishing house. At the time, Balai Pustaka, a publisher operated by the Dutch colonial government, was attracting numerous Sundanese-language writers. His biographers Tini Kartini et al. suggest that Joehana rejected his contemporaries' approach, choosing to work independently rather than again work for the government which had fired him and would certainly censor his works. This, they write, is shown through the themes common in the stories: where his contemporaries focused on escapist literature and entertainment, Joehana focused on social criticism. However, Ajip Rosidi, a scholar of Sundanese literature, suggests that Joehana's refusal to use formal Sundanese meant that Balai Pustaka would not accept his works.

In 1928, Joehana opened the Romans Bureau, which was advertised as offering a variety of services, including the writing and printing of advertisements, translations (from or into English, Dutch, Malay, and Sundanese), and the preparation of story concepts for other writers. Joehana may have also opened a writing course, although apparently most of his income was derived from the royalties of his publications. These publications, particularly his novels, were generally inspired by the types of works that were popular at the time of writing. One of his students, Abdullah Syafi'i Sukandi, recalled that Nangis Wibisana (The Tears of Wibisana) had been written when the dangding (a traditional lyrical form) Tjeurik Oma (Oma's Cry) was popular, whereas Goenoeng Gelenjoe (The Smiling Mountain) had been written during a period of increased interest in humorous anecdotes.

Joehana died after helping put together a stage performance based on his novel Kalepatan Poetra Dosana Iboe Ramaa (The Sins of the Son are the Sins of the Mother and Father) in Tasikmalaya. His body is buried in Bandung. Sources disagree regarding the year of his death. Atikah dates it to c. 1930, a year which Rosidi supports. This estimate has also been reported by literary critic Jakob Soemardjo, who gives Joehana's estimated age at time of his death as 35. Meanwhile, the publisher Kiwari, which reissued Rasiah nu Goreng Patut in 1963, cites the author as having died during the Japanese occupation of the Dutch East Indies (1942–45).

== Works ==
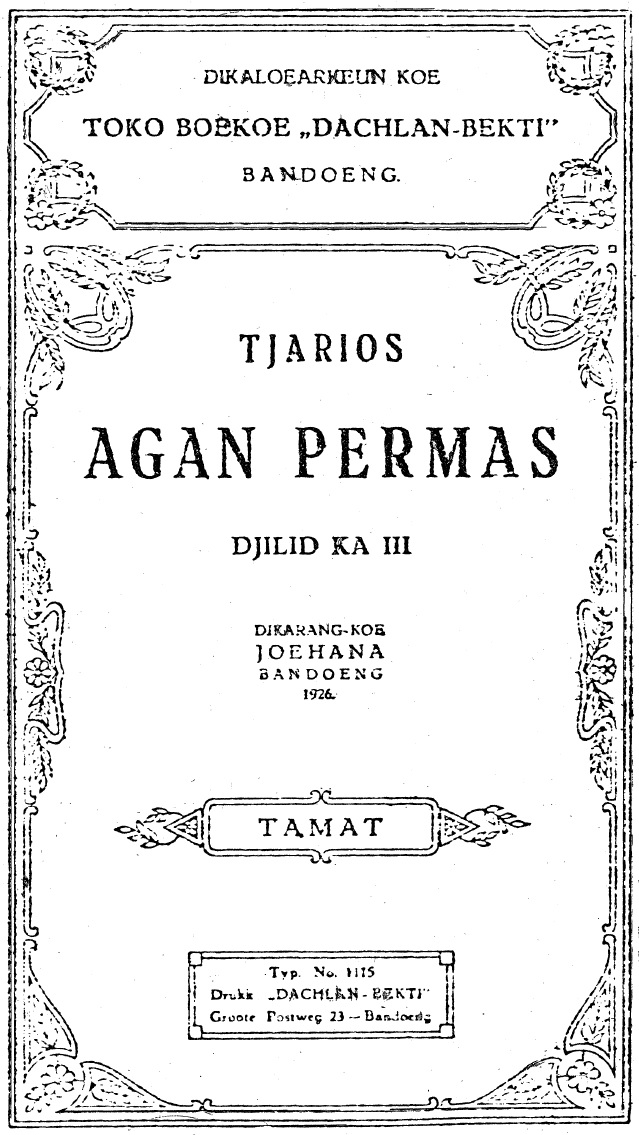
Tjarios Agan Permas (third volume; 1926 edition)

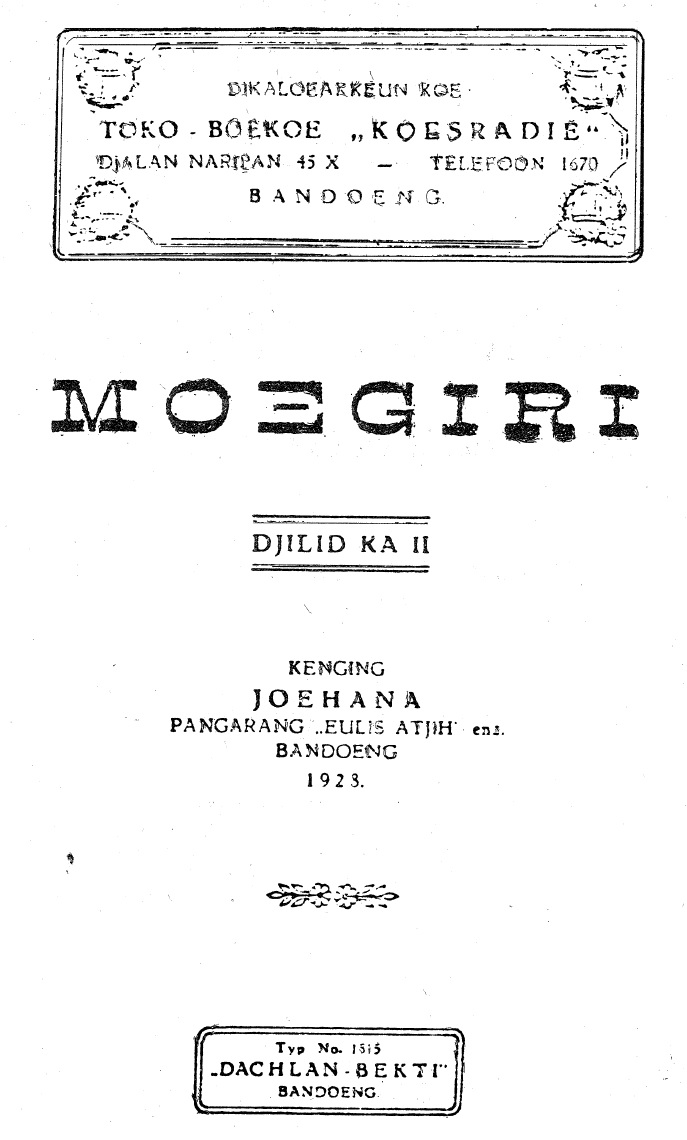
Moegiri (second volume; 1928 edition)

Joehana's œuvre consists of fourteen books, as well as numerous editorials and articles in the newspaper Soerapati. In their 1979 review of the author, Kartini et al. were able to find only six extant titles. It is difficult to determine the original year of publication for these works, for although Joehana's books generally included a year of publication, the printing number was not recorded. As such, sources list works as having been published in different years; for instance, Tjarios Agan Permas is variously dated 1923, 1926, and 1928.

The following list is based on the one compiled by Kartini et al. in their 1979 study. It does not include any of Joehana's work as a journalist, nor does it include works he published through his Romans Bureau. (Note: Although other works, such as Eulis Tjinio, have been attributed to him, they were not included in the review by Kartini et al. owing to a lack of verification (Kartini et al. 1979, p. 16).)

- Bambang Hendrasaputra (in Sundanese). (based on wayang stories)
- Tjarios Agan Permas [The Tale of Agan Permas] (in Sundanese). Bandung: Dakhlan Bekti. (three volumes; 148 pages total)
- Tjarios Eulis Atjih [The Tale of Eulis Atjih] (in Sundanese). Bandung: Dakhlan Bekti. (three volumes)
- Goenoeng Gelenjoe [The Smiling Mountain] (in Sundanese). Bandung: Dakhlan Bekti. (joke book; 31 pages)
- Kalepatan Poetra Dosana Iboe Rama [The Sins of the Son are the Sins of the Mother and Father] (in Sundanese).
- Kasoeat koe Doeriat [Remembering Love] (in Sundanese). Bandung: Dakhlan Bekti. (at least two volumes)
- Lalampahan Pangeran Nampabaja sareng Pangerang Lirbaja [The Tale of Prince Nampabaya and Prince Lirbaya] (in Sundanese). Bandung: Dakhlan Bekti. (one volume; 44 pages)
- Moegiri (in Sundanese). Bandung: Kusradie. (two volumes; 74 pages)
- Nangis Wibisana [The Tears of Wibisana] (in Sundanese). (a dangding)
- Neng Jaja [Miss Yaya] (in Sundanese). Batavia: Krakatau. (two volumes)
- Nj. R. Tedjainten [Mrs. Raden Tedjainten] (in Sundanese). (unpublished)
- Rasiah nu Goreng Patut [Secret of the Ugly One] (in Sundanese). Bandung: Dakhlan Bekti. (one volume; with Soekria (Note: It is unclear who Soekria was, or if Soekria was not another of Joehana's pen names. According to Rasiah nu Goreng Patut, Soekria wrote the story, and Joehana served only as an editor. Rosidi (2013b, p. 12) writes that the language in the book is clearly that of Joehana, and if someone named Soekria did come up with Rasiah nu Goreng Patut, it was only the core plot elements. However, he questions whether Soekria existed: the name Soekria had previously been used for the son of Eulis Acih in Tjarios Eulis Atjih.))
- Roro Amis (in Sundanese).
- Sadjarah Pamidjahan [History of Pamijahan] (in Sundanese).

== Style ==
Joehana appears to have been familiar with the traditional literatures of Maritime Southeast Asia, drawing on the Ramayana for Nangis Wibisana. Wayang characters such as the clown Cepot are referred to in his writings, and he draws on traditional Sundanese storytelling techniques, such as the pantun form of poetry common in wayang golek performances. However, there are significant shifts. His writings depart from the traditional forms of literature such as wawacan, instead embracing the novel, a European literary form. Unlike the formal language used in traditional literature, Joehana wrote in everyday Sundanese. The grammar and structure shows evidence of influence from other languages, and the vocabulary is likewise not purely Sundanese; some Dutch (the language of the colonial government) is mixed in.

The Sundanese author M. A. Salmoen classifies Joehana as a realist. Rosidi writes that a sense of realism was promoted in Joehana's writings through the use of references to existing (and often popular) brands of products, including cigars, salted fish, and biscuits (though, as Joehana wrote for persons in contemporary Bandung who were expected to know these products, they are not given any in-text explanation). Joehana used real-life Bandung locations in his novels, and local figures prominent in the news (such as the pickpocket Salim) are mentioned in passing. There is also the possibility that the use of such names are a form of product placement, in which Joehana was paid to include the names of the products in his novels; this payment may not have been direct, but in the form of goods or services, or a donation to Sarekat Rakyat.

Joehana displayed a sense of humour that was well received by his contemporaries: for instance, the frog chaser Karnadi of Rasiah nu Goreng Patut describes his trips to the rice fields to catch frogs as "going to the office" and the stick with which he kills the frogs as his "pencil", whereas the Dutchman Van der Zwak of Tjarios Agan Permas uses the most polite register of Sundanese (Note: In Sundanese, there are different registers used for speaking. The most polite form is generally reserved for those of a higher social position.) while speaking to his dog. Some of these jokes have remained popular; Rosidi records one, about how to speak Dutch, as having survived into the 1980s. (Note: In Rasiah nu Goreng Patut, the uneducated Karnadi attempts to pass as a rich and well-educated contractor. In order to convince his prospective father-in-law, Karnadi relates that, to speak Dutch, one need only add de before a word and "ceh" at the end of a word. For instance, lamp would become de lamceh (Joehana & Soekria 2013, p. 45).)

== Themes ==
The dominant theme in Joehana's work is social criticism, particularly regarding socioeconomic conditions. In Rasiah nu Goreng Patut, he criticised those who sought material wealth above all other things through the Eulis Awang and her family, who are so enraptured by their greed that they do not realize that the man asking for Eulis Awang's hand in marriage is not who he claims to be. In Tjarios Eulis Atjih, the main characters Arsad and Eulis Atjih, while both exemplifying greed and its inevitable repercussions, further show that wealth is not eternal: both lose their wealth and societal positions, then must earn a living. In the novel, Johanna calls on the rich to support and defend the poor, not despise them. That both rich and poor should receive equal treatment is emphasised in Tjarios Agan Permas:

Of the minds of the poor or the commoners, there is no difference with those of the rich or the menak [noblemen], so long as they have the same chance to learn. Beware, never forget, one's mind should not only be used to make a living, but must also be used to meet the needs of the many. (Note: Original: "Pakeun uteuk si miskin atawa si menak asal pada-pada diajar nu sarua luhurna. Kada ulah poho, yen kapinteran teh lain ngan wungkul pakeun neangan kahirupan bae, tapi kudu bisa metakeun pakeun kaperluan sarerea.")

Another traditionally respected group which Joehana criticizes is the hajjis, those Muslims who have been on the Hajj pilgrimage to Mecca. The hajjis in Joehana's stories are generally greedy and lustful, without any interest in the good of humanity. In Tjarios Agan Permas, for instance, Hajji Serbanna displays his hypocrisy by damning usury as haraam (sinful) while charging high interest rates for a loan, and refuses to complete the mandatory prayers because he is waiting on a guest bearing large gifts. The hajji is portrayed as wearing so much make-up that, in the opinion of Kartini et al., it is as if he is deliberately dressing as a clown.

Although Joehana rejects forced marriage—a common practice among the Sundanese in the early 20th century—and promotes the idea of marriage for love, he also warns against the dangers of overly free interactions between men and women. Through Kalepatan Poetra Dosana Iboe Rama he condemns forced marriage by depicting the marriage of a young woman to a wealthy man who is old enough to be her father; this ultimately leaves the woman an outcast, reaping the "sins" of her parents. Both Moegiri and Neng Jaja, meanwhile, dealt with young women who were overly free in their interactions with men, and thus faced a sorrowful fate: divorce, abuse, and infidelity.

== Legacy ==
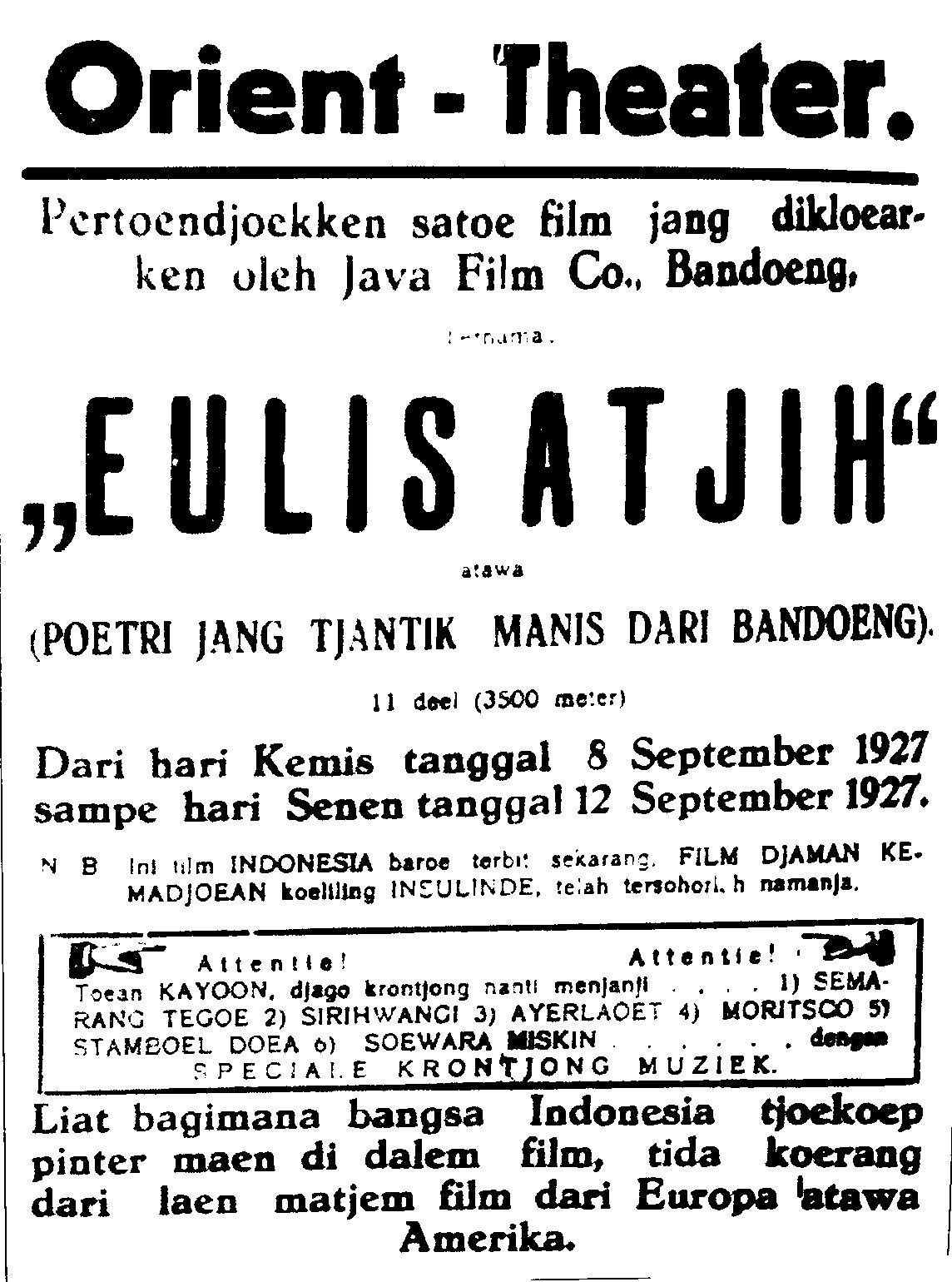
Newspaper advertisement for Eulis Atjih (1927), adapted from Joehana's novel

Joehana's works were commercially successful, and often adapted to the stage. His Rasiah nu Goreng Patut, for instance, was adapted into a variety of forms, including as a Malay-language lenong, and a stage performance of Tjarios Eulis Atjih is recorded in Ciamis. Three films have been adapted from novels by Joehana, two from Tjarios Eulis Atjih and one from Rasiah nu Goreng Patut. The first, Eulis Atjih, was directed and produced by George Krugers and released in 1927 to popular success. The second, generally referred to as Karnadi Anemer Bangkong, was adapted from Rasiah nu Goreng Patut by Krugers and released in the early 1930s; it is known to have been a commercial failure, reportedly raising controversy for depicting a Muslim man eating frog meat. The third adaptation of a Joehana novel, also titled Eulis Atjih, was completed by Rd Ariffien in 1954. Stage performances of Rasiah nu Goreng Patut continued as late as 1980, though by that time the work was considered by the general public as part of folklore.

Little academic discourse on Joehana was published until the 1960s; according to Kartini et al., this is attributable to Joehana's use of non-formal Sundanese. This renewal began with the republication of two of his works: Rasiah nu Goreng Patut in 1963 as a standalone book by Kiwari, and Moegiri as a serial beginning with the 15 October 1965 edition of Sunda magazine. (Note: The mid-1960s were a period of increased interest in Sundanese-language novels. Kiwari republished several books in this time-frame, including novels by Syarif Amin, Tini Kartini, and Tjaraka (Rosidi 2013a, p. 165).) (Note: Moegiri was republished as a standalone book in 1989 by Girimukti Pasaka (WorldCat, Mugiri).) Rosidi, that magazine's editor, included discussion of Joehana in his 1966 book Kesusastraan Sunda Dewasa Ini (Contemporary Sundanese Literature). Some more discussion, by authors such as Yus Rusyana and Rusman Sutiamarga, was published in magazines such as Wangsit or included in university lectures. Until 1979 Joehana's works had not been taught in Sundanese-language courses in schools.

Modern critical reception of Joehana's output has generally been negative. Sumardjo writes that his greatest weakness was a lack of in-depth exploration of characters' psyches, as well as a tendency to include an unclear social background. Kartini et al. note Joehana's productivity, but find a lack of characterisation in his works. They find that, at times, his attempt to convey a social message is so dominant that the works come across as propaganda. Rosidi gives a more positive view of Joehana's writing, noting that, although the use of non-formal Sundanese was contentious in the 1920s, it nonetheless meant the language in Joehana's works was more dynamic and "alive" than in works published by Balai Pustaka.

== Works cited ==
- Biran, Misbach Yusa (2009). Sejarah Film 1900-1950: Bikin Film di Jawa [History of Film 1900-1950: Making Films in Java] (in Indonesian). Komunitas Bamboo working with the Jakarta Art Council. ISBN 978-979-3731-58-2.
- "Eulis Atjih". Filmindonesia.or.id (in Indonesian). Konfiden Foundation. Archived from the original on 19 February 2014.
- Joehana; Soekria (2013) [1928]. Rasiah nu Goréng Patut [Secret of the Ugly One] (in Sundanese). Bandung: Kiblat. ISBN 978-979-8002-31-1.
- Kartini, Tini; Hadish, Yetty Kumsiyati; Sumadipura, Sutedja; Iskandarwassid (1979). Yuhana: Sastrawan Sunda [Yuhana: A Sundanese Man of Letters] (in Indonesian). Jakarta: Department of Education and Culture. OCLC 248300199.
- Mugiri. WorldCat. OCLC 65543007.
- Rosidi, Ajip (2013a) [1966]. Mengenal Kesusasteraan Sunda [Introduction to Sundanese Literature] (in Indonesian). Bandung: Pustaka Jaya. ISBN 978-979-419-413-3.
- Rosidi, Ajip (2013b) [1983]. "Rasiah nu Goréng Patut-na Joehana" [Joehana's Rasiah nu Goréng Patut]. Rasiah nu Goréng Patut [Secret of the Ugly One] (in Sundanese). Bandung: Kiblat. pp. 5–13. ISBN 978-979-8002-31-1.
- Sumardjo, Jakob (1989). "Joehana". Ensiklopedi Nasional Indonesia (in Indonesian). Vol. 7. Jakarta: Cipta Adi Pustaka. p. 461. OCLC 248133402.
- "Tjerita Eulis Atjih Djadi Rewel" [The Story of Eulis Atjih Becomes Complicated]. Pewarta Soerabaia (in Malay). 29 May 1928. p. n.p. (clipping accessed at Sinematek Indonesia)
