= Komedi Stambul =

Indonesian performing art

- Originating culture: Indonesia

Komedi Stambul (or simply Stambul), spelled Komedie Stamboel during the Dutch colonial era, is a form of trans-ethnic Indonesian folk theatre developed lately, from the 19th-century to the mid-20th century. The theatre originated in the Dutch East Indies (modern-day Indonesia).

Stambul drew inspiration from a variety of styles, including Malay, Western, and Chinese opera, as well as Middle Eastern music and operetta.

== See also ==
- Toneel
