= Bangsawan =

Indonesian and Malaysian traditional opera

- Bangsawan, a Malay opera in Penang, Straits Settlements, circa 1895.
- Native name: بڠساون
- Origin: Malaysia

Bangsawan (Jawi: بڠساون) is a type of traditional Malay opera or theatre performed by a troupe and accompanied by music and sometimes dances. The bangsawan theatrical performance encompasses music, dance, and drama. It is widely spread in the Malay cultural realm in Malaysia, Indonesia, Singapore, and Brunei. The artform is indigenous to the Malay Peninsula, Riau Islands, Sumatra, and coastal Borneo.

== Etymology ==
In the Malay language, bangsawan means "nobleman". Bangsa means "nation", "race", from the Sanskrit word vamsa, which means "family", "dynasty". The suffix -wan comes from the Sanskrit suffix -vant. A person is called bangsawan if he is descended from royal family (kings, princes, etc.). The theatre is called bangsawan because it is most often depicting the legends and stories of Malay nobles that took place in istana (Malay palaces and courts).

There was another category of noblemen in Indonesia, precisely in Java, called priyayi, who were not members of royal or princely families but formed a sort of nobles of the Robe, exerting administrative functions, including that of adipati (governor).

== Theme ==
The bangsawan theatre usually centered on istana or Malay palace. The main theme of bangsawan theatre is usually based upon the adventure, romance and conquest of Malay sultans, kings, heroes, nobles, princes and princesses, that took place in various Malay courts in the archipelago. The fertile local Malay legends and epics such as the "Sulalatus Salatin" provides storylines and theme for the story to develop. The Malay King such as Seri Tri Buana and the popular Malay heroes such as the adventure of Hang Tuah of Malacca are the popular bangsawan themes. Other themes such as the play "Seulas Nangka" tells about the history of Siak Sri Indrapura Sultanate. Popular folklore was also a theme, the play "Panglima Nayan" tells the story of a robin hood-like character active in late 19th-century central Kedah.

== Form ==
The bangsawan theatre is quite similar to western opera or drama, where the stories are presented through acting and singing, and certain characters are played during performance. The stories are drawn from diverse sources, such as local Malay, Indonesian, Indian, Arabic, Chinese and Western sources. Music, dance and costumes are used depending on the story being told. The performance is accompanied by music consists of gendang, rebana, drum and violin, playing Malay music and chanting dendang or Malay songs.

Acting was done on improvisation to suit audience reactions, and hence actors played without scripts.

== History ==
Bangsawan first developed in Penang, Malaysia, from the South Asian Parsi theatre performed by companies from the Bombay region; the first local troupe Pusi Indera Bangsawan of Penang was founded in 1885 and named after tycoon Mohamed Pusi who patroned the arts prior. The bangsawan theatre troupes reached their peak of popularity in the 19th to mid 20th century prior to the great war. In colonial Dutch East Indies the bangsawan theatre has inspired and influenced other form of theatrical performances, such as Komedie Stamboel and toneel. Prior to the development and the spread of radio and television entertainment in the region, travelling live theatres and drama such as bangsawan, was the main source of entertainment for local Malays in the villages and cities alike, and was held in high anticipation and excitement. In Lingga, Riau Islands, bangsawan show enjoyed its popularity among locals until around 1960s to 1970s. However, today in Indonesia, only a handful of bangsawan troupes survive. Nowadays, it is difficult, if not impossible to find any bangsawan troupes in Malaysia. A bangsawan troupe still operates in Singapore.

The advent of cinema into the Malay speaking world early 20th century attracted bangsawan actors to the media integrating the artform's conventions into a new audiovisual culture in the process: the 1933 film Laila Majnun boasted a cast of such thespians. The Shaw Brothers themselves gave financial support to bangsawan troupes in the 1930s, and a collective of bangsawan actors helmed many Shaw-made Malay films during 1940 and 1941. However as decades go on, the actors' flair for exaggerated dramatics became less appealing to newer and more seasoned audiences who saw them as "unnatural" and wanted its aesthetics to match those of Hollywood. Singaporean film composer Zubir Said spent his formative years outside Sumatra in a bangsawan troupe and derived his experience of its sonic influences into his film music repertoire.

== See also ==
- Mak yong
- Wayang
