= Lutung Kasarung =

Indonesian folktale

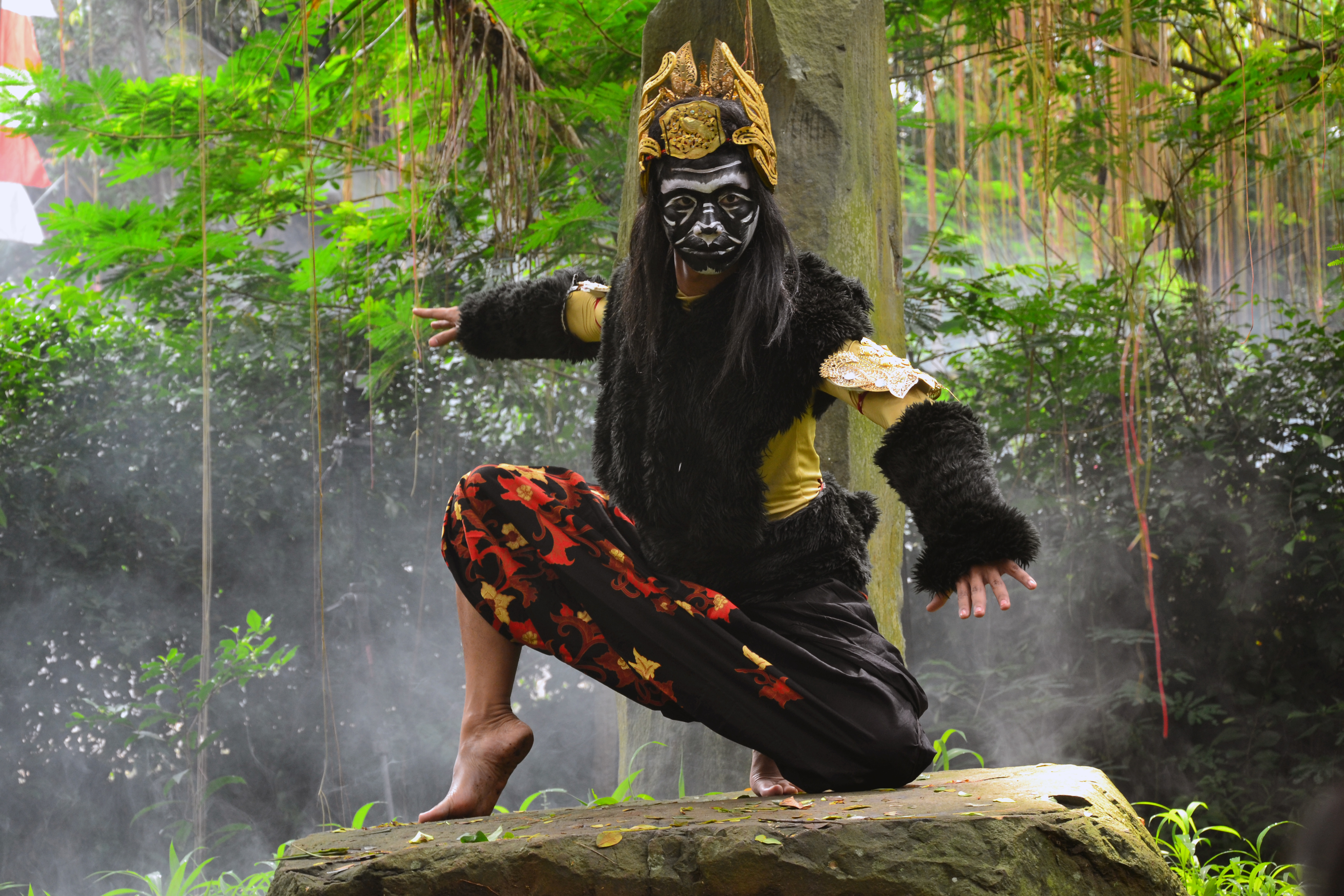
A depiction of Lutung Kasarung in traditional Sundanese sandiwara dance drama.

Lutung Kasarung (English: The Lost Ape, The Stray Ape) is a Sundanese folktale from Indonesia. Set in the Pasir Batang Kingdom, it tells the tale of a magical lutung (a type of black monkey) who helped a beautiful princess, Purbasari Ayuwangi, when her older sister attempted to rob her of her status as crown princess. The story is from an old Sundanese pantun.

The theme and moral of the legend are similar to those of the European folktale "Beauty and the Beast" (Indonesian: Si Cantik dan Si Buruk Rupa).

== Sources ==
Before it was put in written form, this legend was transmitted via Pantun Sunda, a traditional Sundanese oral performance. It was later written down by Sundanese writers, in both the Sundanese and Indonesian languages.

== Summary ==
In the heaven called Svargaloka, there lived a handsome and powerful god named Batara Guruminda Kahyangan. He had almost become the highest god in heaven; but in his pride, he defied Batari Sunan Ambu, the highest mother goddess in Sundanese mythology. As punishment, he was cursed and banished from heaven and incarnated upon earth as a black lutung monkey, in which body he was condemned to live until he could learn humility and earn the sincere love of a woman.

Meanwhile, on earth, Prabu Tapa Agung, the aging king of Pasir Batang, had two daughters: Purbararang and Purbasari. Purbasari was kind and good-hearted, while her older sister Purbararang was wicked. Because of this, the king wanted Purbasari to succeed him when he retired.

=== Purbasari's exile ===
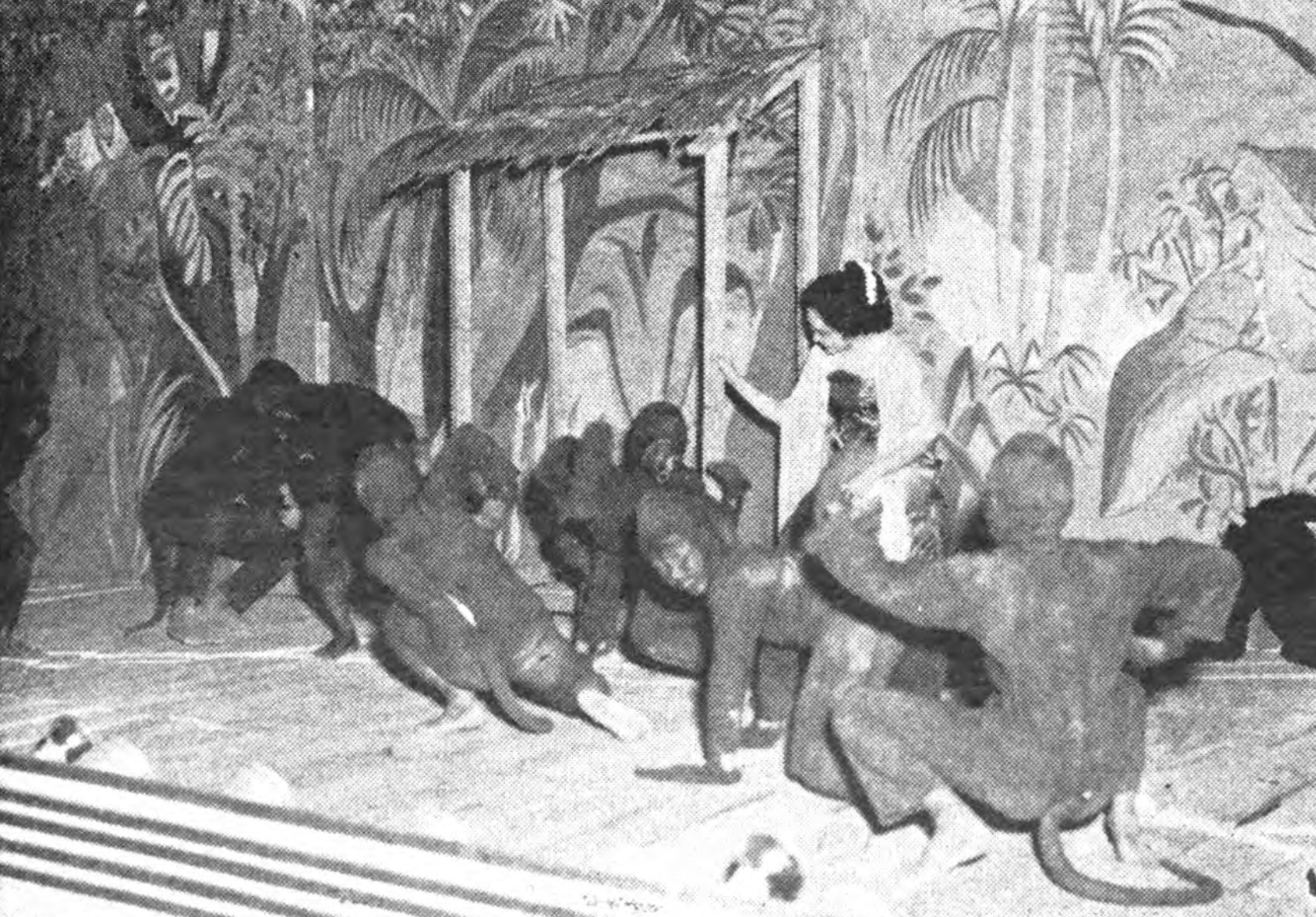
Purbasari seeking shelter among the apes in a 1953 production

This angered Purbararang, the elder daughter. With her fiancé Indrajaya, she went to a witch and asked her to cast a magical spell and potion upon Purbasari. The witch prepared a dangerous lulur (traditional body lotion) and Purbararang tricked Purbasari into using the lotion. The lulur left Purbasari with a rash all over her body. This illness was regarded as a curse from the gods, so Purbasari was exiled from the palace and driven to live in a shack in the jungle.

In the jungle, Purbasari's only companions were the animals. One of these was a black monkey named Lutung Kasarung, who was the cursed god Guruminda, and who had magical powers and could talk with humans. To help Purbasari, Lutung Kasarung took her to a lake and told her to bathe in it. He then took some sinom (young tamarind leaves) from the tree, gave it to Purbasari, and told her to rub her body with it. This magically cured the skin condition caused by the witch's spell and restored her beauty.

One morning, Purbasari awoke and was surprised to find herself in a beautiful palace—Lutung Kasarung had transformed her humble shack into a palace overnight. The news of the palace that had magically appeared in the jungle attracted people from all around. When they learned that a kind, generous, and beautiful princess lived there, many stayed, creating a lively new town where there was jungle. The news of the new town reached Purbararang; when she discovered that her younger sister ruled the town, she was consumed with envy.

Purbararang decided to bring Purbasari down by giving her impossible tasks to do. One day, a banteng bull ran amok and began wreaking havoc in the capital city. No man was able to stop it as it destroyed the square and the marketplace. Purbararang sent a messenger to Purbarsari, ordering her to catch the raging bull. Purbasari was distressed, but Lutung Kasarung told her to take a lock of her hair and put it around the bull's neck. Purbarsari did so, and the bull was instantly tamed.

Purbararang then ordered Purbasari to make a dam and dry up the Lubuk Sipatahunan wetlands, so that she could catch the fish in them. Lutung Kasarung again saved the day, magically drying up the wetlands. While the people were catching fish, a mysterious handsome man appeared and presented some fish to the princesses. Purbararang was smitten with the handsome man and instantly forgot about her fiancé Indrajaya. The man, who was Lutung Kasarung temporarily transformed back into his form as Guruminda, gave his fish to Purbasari, and then vanished. This only made Purbararang more jealous of her sister.

=== Purbasari's return ===
After this, Purbararang summoned Purbasari to the palace in the capital city. When Purbasari arrived, she had her thrown in jail. Lutung Kasarung waited for Purbasari to come home to her palace; but when, after several days, there was no news about her, Lutung Kasarung grew alarmed. He stormed the palace to rescue Purbasari from captivity. The two of them found themselves surrounded by palace guards, with Lutung fighting bravely to protect Purbasari. In the middle of the chaotic fight, Prabu Tapa Agung returned to the palace from the hermitage where he had been living as an ascetic and discovered his daughters fighting for the throne.

Purbararang asked Prabu Tapa Agung to select the princess with the longer hair as his successor. The king agreed to do so; then, when he measured his daughters' hair, he found that Purbasari's was longer.

Undaunted, Purbararang made a new demand to Prabu Tapa Agung: that he choose as his successor the daughter who had the most handsome fiancé. This was a competition that she was confident she could win since she had the handsome Indrajaya and Purbasari had no man to support her—only an ugly black monkey. However, Purbasari saw beyond Lutung Kasarung's appearance and recognized his good heart, loyalty, and devotion to her. She reached out to him and chose him as her fiancé. The people ridiculed her decision; but at that moment, the curse was broken since he finally earned the sincere love of Purbasari, and Lutung Kasarung resumed his form as Guruminda. Since he was much more handsome than Indrajaya, Prabu Tapa Agung chose Purbasari to be his successor. In one last effort, Purbararang asked Indrajaya to fight Guruminda in a pencak silat martial art combat. The fight was quickly won by the powerful Guruminda.

Purbasari benevolently forgave Pubararang and Indrajaya for all their wrongdoing and allowed them to remain in the palace. She and Guruminda were married and lived happily ever after.

== Adaptations ==
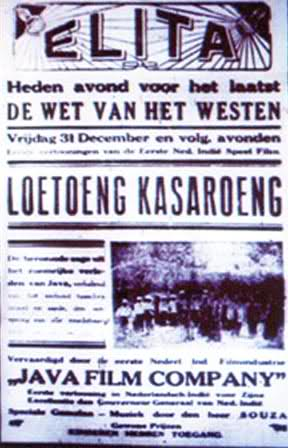
A promotional poster of Loetoeng Kasaroeng (1926) film, an adaptation of the Lutung Kasarung folklore.

It was first brought to the public in 1921 by Bandung regent RA Wiranatakusumah in the form of gending karesmen; a drama using traditional music. Five years later, NV Java Film Company produced a silent film, titled Loetoeng Kasaroeng, the first ever movie in the country. It was made during the Dutch colonial era, under the direction of L. Heuveldorp. It was filmed in Bandung in 1926 and released there by the NV Java Film Company. It played from 31 December 1926 to 6 January 1927 at the Elite and Oriental Bioscoop (Majestic) theatres.

A version of the legend was written in Indonesian by the Dutch artist Tilly Dalton in 1950. A copy of the book was donated to KITLV in Leiden, Holland.

The tale of Lutung Kasarung is often adapted into the play of sandiwara, a traditional Sundanese drama, such as the one performed by Miss Tjitjih Sundanese sandiwara drama troupe. The story often appeared in children's storybooks and comic books in Indonesia, and its adaptation often appeared in Indonesian TV sinetrons.

The Lutung Kasarung Musical was staged in Indonesian theaters in Bandung (2011) and Jakarta (2012) in Teater Jakarta, Taman Ismail Marzuki. The musical presents a modern performance that combines dance, drama, and music genres spanning from traditional to pop, rock, dangdut, and traditional Sundanese string and percussion music.

== See also ==
- Animal as Bridegroom
- King Iguana
- Pantun Sunda
- Sunda Kingdom
- West Java
