= Loetoeng Kasaroeng =

1926 film by G. Kruger, L. Heuveldorp

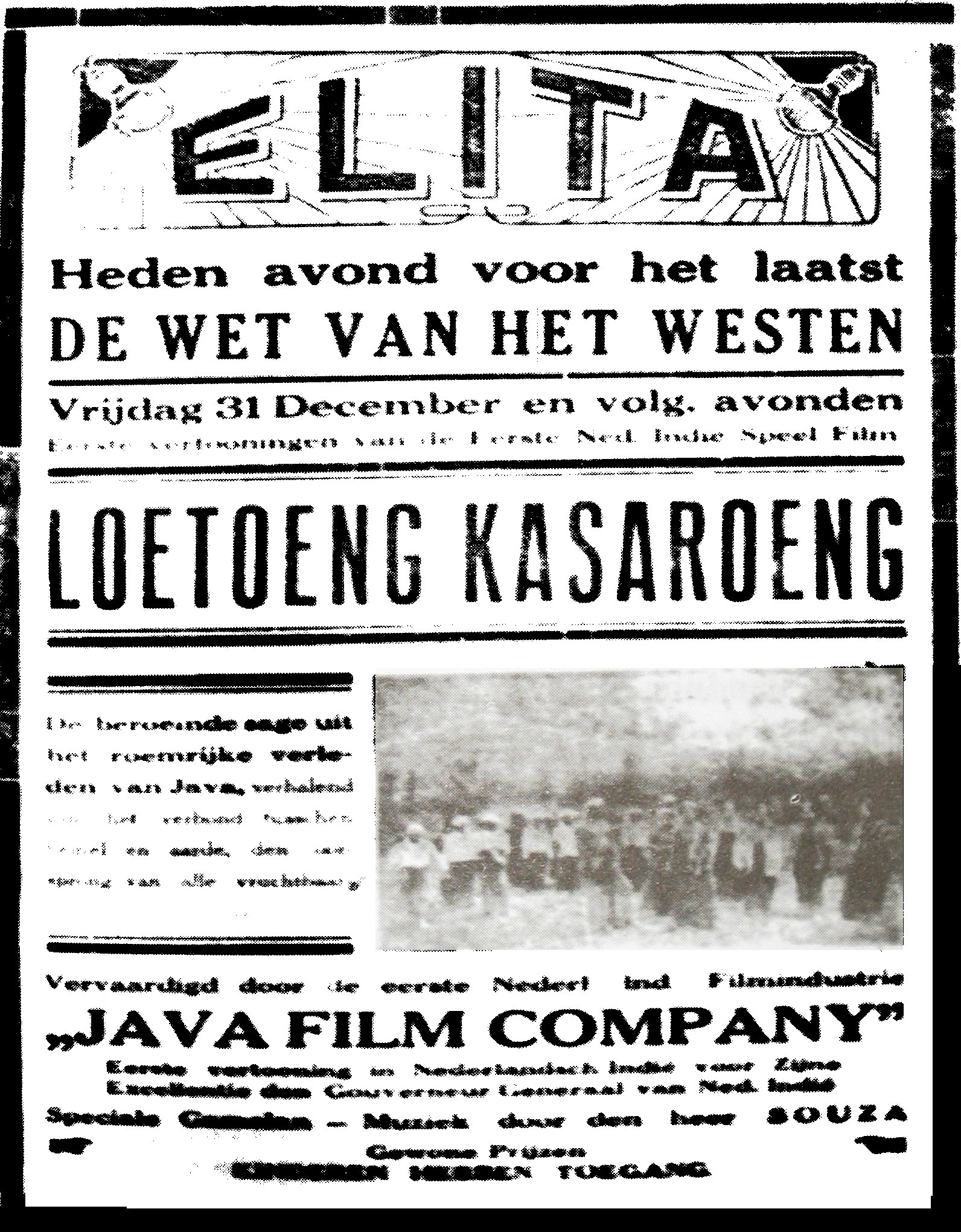
- Directed by: L. Heuveldorp
- Cinematography: George Krugers
- Production company: Java Film
- Release date: 31 December 1926
- Running time: 60 minutes
- Country: Dutch East Indies
- Language: Silent film

Loetoeng Kasaroeng is a 1926 fantasy film from the Dutch East Indies (modern-day Indonesia) which was directed and produced by L. Heuveldorp. An adaptation of the Sundanese folktale Lutung Kasarung (The Lost Lutung), the film tells of a young girl who falls in love with a magical lutung and stars the children of noblemen. Details on its performance are unavailable, although it is known to have been of poor technical quality and thought to have performed poorly. It was the first film produced in the country and the first to feature a native-Indonesian cast. It is likely a lost film.

== Plot ==
Purbasari and Purbararang are sisters and in competition. Purbararang, the elder sister, teases Purbasari about the latter's lover, a lutung named Guru Minang; Purbarang's boyfriend, Indrajaya, is a handsome human. However, the girls discover that Guru Minang is a god who is more handsome than Indrajaya.

== Production ==
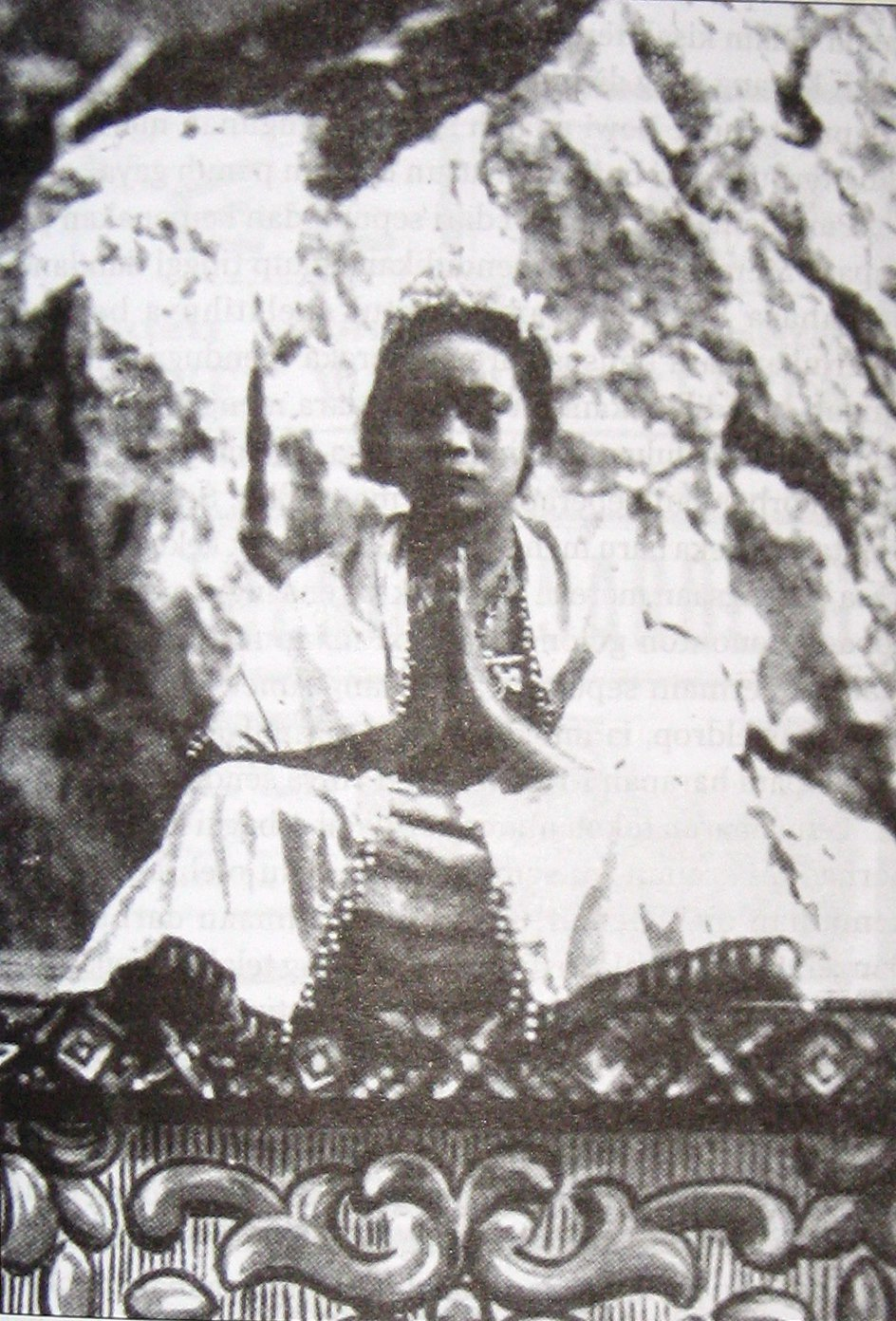
A promotional still showing one of the cast members, in costume

The first showing of films in the Dutch East Indies was in 1900, and over the next twenty years foreign productions – generally from the United States – were imported and shown throughout the country. Domestic production of documentaries had begun in 1911 but were unable to compete with imported works. By 1923 a local feature film production spearheaded by the Middle East Film Co. was announced, but the work was not completed.

Under pressure from imported works, in 1926 N.V. Java Film, a production house based in Batavia (modern-day Jakarta) which had previously produced a single documentary, Inlanders op de Krokodillenjacht (Native Crocodile Hunters), chose to make a feature film based on the Sundanese folktale Lutung Kasarung. The company's owner, L. Heuveldorp served as director and producer, while its laboratory head George Krugers handled cinematography and processing. Little biographical information is available regarding the background of both men, although it was reported that Heuveldorp had previous experience working in the United States.

The cast was drawn entirely from the priyayi (noble) class, under the coordination of school headmaster Raden Kartabrata. Among the cast were children of Wiranatakusumah V, the regent of Bandung; he had agreed to help fund the film to promote Sundanese culture, and had previously brought the story to the stage. Further subsidies had come from the Ministry of Defence, which donated trucks to ease filming.

Filming had begun by August 1926, when several scenes were shot in a cave that had been excavated for the production on Karang Hill. Heuveldorp, unable to force the actors to play their roles seriously, shot several scenes with them acting as they wished before showing them the results; upon realising that their acting had been disappointing, the cast began to listen to stage directions. Afterward, they began rehearsing each scene at least twice, with Kartabrata standing behind the cinematographer and giving directions.

== Release and reception ==
The film was screened on 31 December 1926 at the Oriental and Elita Theatres in Bandung, making it the first domestically-produced feature film and the first with a native cast. The advertisements were in both Dutch- and Malay-language publications. The film was screened for only a week, with live Sundanese gamelan performances providing music, after which Loetoeng Kasaroeng was replaced with Hollywood films. From 14 to 17 February 1927, the film was screened in the Mignon cinema in Cheribon. Although its box office performance is not recorded, it is thought to have been poor.

A review by "Bandoenger" in Panorama magazine considered the film of poor technical quality compared to imported films, suggesting that the production was underfunded; the review states that some actors were not paid for their work. Reporting on a private screening of the film for Governor General Andries Cornelis Dirk de Graeff, the Buitenzorg correspondent of the Java-Bode wrote: "The shots were out of focus and the entire film made a murky and dark impression. The directing was clumsy, and the sets and costumes paltry. Of the many participants, not one drew attention by acting well." The Indonesian film historian Misbach Yusa Biran wrote that Loetoeng Kasaroeng would have been poorly received outside of West Java, owing to Sundanese culture and dance not being considered interesting to other ethnic groups, particularly the Javanese. William van der Heide, a lecturer on film studies at the University of Newcastle in Australia, notes that the tendency of European filmmakers to depict natives as primitives may also have influenced the poor ticket sales.

== Legacy ==
Although Heuveldorp is not recorded as being involved in any more fiction film productions, Krugers went on to direct several films, including the area's first talkie, Karnadi Anemer Bangkong (1931), before leaving the country in 1936. At least one of the cast members, Oemar, is recorded as continuing to act. Lutung Kasarung was adapted to film twice further, in 1952 and 1983.

After Loetoeng Kasaroeng was released, numerous domestic films were made. The second domestic production, Eulis Atjih (1927), was directed by Krugers and received a wider release. With the release of Lily van Java (Lily of Java) in 1928, ethnic Chinese became involved in the industry; by 1940 native directors had become common. However, the first truly Indonesian film is considered to be Usmar Ismail's Darah dan Doa (The Long March) in 1950, released after the Dutch recognised Indonesia's independence in 1949.

Loetoeng Kasaroeng is likely a lost film. The American visual anthropologist Karl G. Heider wrote that all Indonesian films from before 1950 are lost. However, JB Kristanto's Katalog Film Indonesia (Indonesian Film Catalogue) records several as having survived at Sinematek Indonesia's archives, and Biran writes that several Japanese propaganda films have survived at the Netherlands Government Information Service.

== See also ==
- List of films of the Dutch East Indies
- List of lost films
