= George Krugers =

Dutch East Indies filmmaker (1890–1964)

- Krugers in 1928
- Born: George Edward Albert Krugers; 24 November 1890; Banda Neira, Dutch East Indies
- Died: 10 August 1964 (aged 73); The Hague, Netherlands
- Occupation: Filmmaker
- Years active: 1924–1933

George Edward Albert Krugers (24 November 1890 – 10 August 1964) was a filmmaker active in the Dutch East Indies (modern Indonesia) during the early 20th century. Born in Banda Neira, he migrated to Java in the 1920s and spent time in Surabaya before moving to Bandung. There, he worked with L. Heuveldorp on the colony's first feature film, Loetoeng Kasaroeng (The Mystical Monkey), before making his directorial debut in 1927 with Eulis Atjih. The following year, he established the Krugers Film Company; under this banner, he joined the Hajj in 1928 to produce Het Groote Mekka-Feest (The Great Mecca Feast), considered the first documentary film about the pilgrimage.

In 1930, Krugers began producing sound films, with his Karnadi Anemer Bangkong (Karnadi the Frog Contractor, 1930) thought to have been the first domestic sound film in the Indies. After this failed commercially, he began working for Tan's Film, with whom he made two films. During the Great Depression, Krugers moved to Hong Kong, hoping to find work, but was unsuccessful. He spent the remainder of his life in the Netherlands, frequently experiencing financial difficulties. Aside from Het Groote Mekka-Feest, all of his films are believed lost.

== Biography ==
=== Early life and career ===
George Edward Albert Krugers was born on Banda Neira, an island in the Dutch East Indies (now Indonesia), on 24 November 1890. The son of Johan Krugers, a Dutch-born schoolmaster, and Aline Burgemeestre, whose family had lived in the Indies since the 1700s, Krugers was raised within the island's large Christian community. Little is recorded about his childhood. He showed an early interest in technology, and is known to have studied architecture while also familiarizing himself with photography, film, and sound recording. Imported films had been introduced to the Indies as early as 1896, and from 1911 documentary films were produced in the archipelago.

Krugers migrated to Surabaya in eastern Java, where he spent time as a water engineer. He moved to Bandung in western Java around 1925, where he married Elisabeth Schut, the daughter of a shipping dynasty. He also led the laboratory at N.V. Java Film. According to the scholar of postcolonialism A. Budi Susanto, Krugers was one of its founders, together with the Dutchman L. Heuveldorp. The company exclusively produced documentaries until 1926, when Heuveldorp directed the colony's first feature film, Loetoeng Kasaroeng (The Mystical Monkey). Krugers served as a cameraman for the film, which was based on a Sundanese folktale, and also processed the film in his laboratory. Although the work was criticized for its technical quality, it received a private screening for Governor General Andries Cornelis Dirk de Graeff.

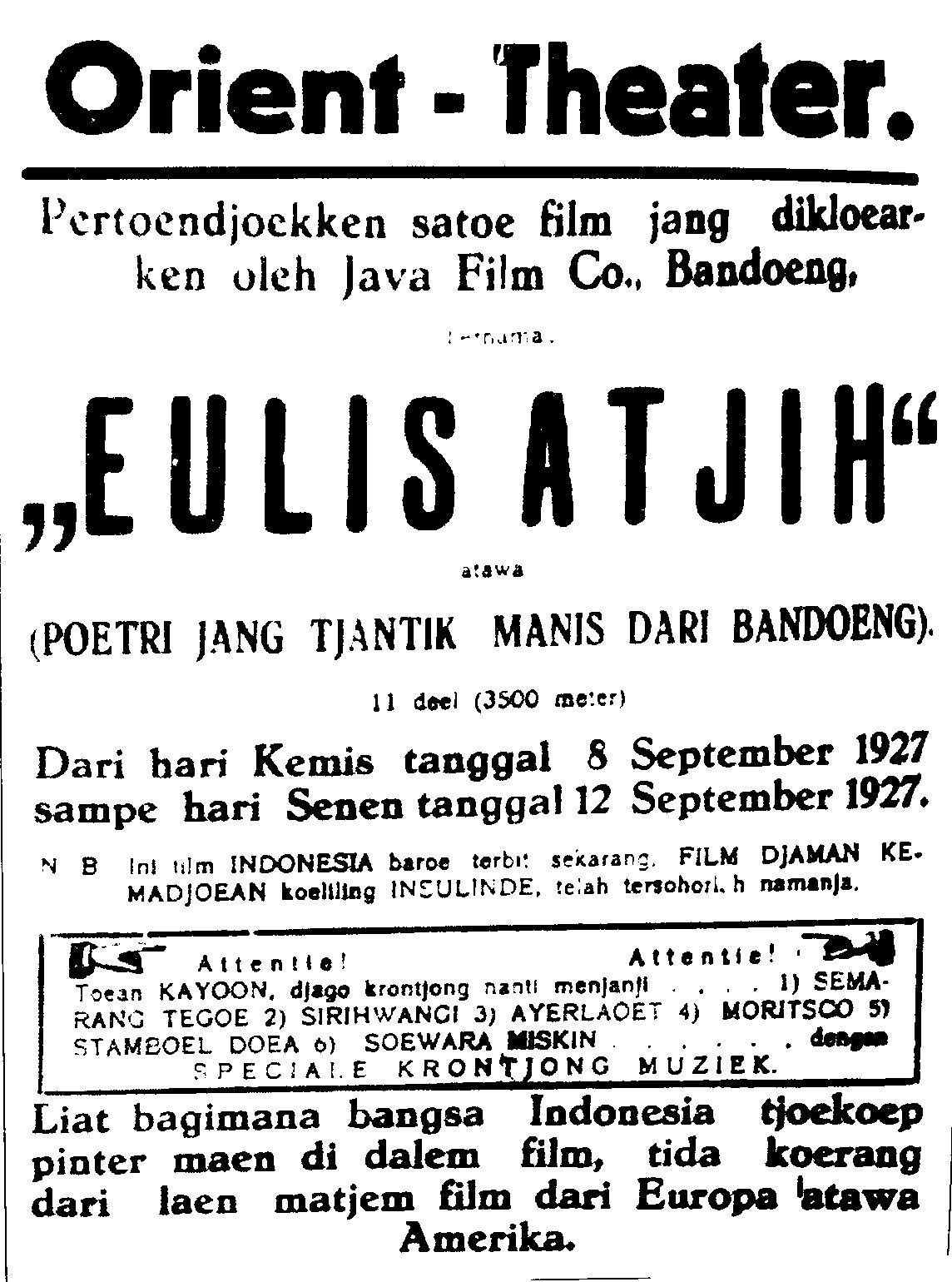
Advertisement for Eulis Atjih (1927), Krugers's directorial debut

The following year, Krugers directed his own film, Eulis Atjih, for which he also served as scriptwriter and cinematographer. Based on the novel by Joehana, the film followed a woman named Eulis Atjih who falls into poverty after being left by her husband. Produced with a limited budget and using amateur actors, the film was commercially successful in its domestic screenings. International screenings, which emphasised the film's ethnographic aspects, were less successful. For his work on the film, Krugers was complimented by the Dutch film pioneer Willy Mullens, which the historian Rukayyah Reichling cites as Krugers's motivation for leaving Java Film.

Krugers established his own company, Krugers Filmbedrijf (Krugers Film Company), in 1928. He reportedly worked on film adaptations of the folktales Roro Mendut and Prono Tjitro, although it is not known if he finished them. He completed a documentary entitled Het Groote Mekka-Feest (The Great Mecca Feast), which followed Hajj pilgrims from the Indies during their trip to Mecca. Krugers performed the pilgrimage himself, probably receiving support from the Islamic scholar Agus Salim as well as the Dutch passenger lines that handled the Hajj. After screening in the Indies, the film premiered in Leiden, the Netherlands, on 8 November 1928. This showing was attended by numerous Dutch socialites, including Princess Juliana, and introduced by the Dutch Orientalist Christiaan Snouck Hurgronje.

=== Sound films and later life ===
The first sound films shown in the Indies, Fox Movietone Follies of 1929 and The Rainbow Man, came from the United States and were screened in late 1929. The arrival of imported sound films encouraged Krugers to make Karnadi Anemer Bangkong (Karnadi the Frog Contractor), (Note: This title is based on the recollection of the journalist M. Enoh, writing in 1976 (Filmindonesia.or.id, Karnadi). Based on contemporary reporting, the Canadian film historian Christopher Woodrich writes that the release title was Roesia Gadis Priangan (Secret of the Girl from Priangan) (Woodrich 2017). This title is also paired with Een Moderne Indonesische Don Juan in contemporary advertising (De Indische Courant 1930, Centraal-Theater).) also known as Een Moderne Indonesische Don Juan (A Modern Indonesian Don Juan) in Dutch, in 1930. A comedy adapted from the novel Rasiah nu Goreng Patut (Secret of the Ugly One) by Joehana and Sukria, (Note: It is unclear who Sukria was, or if this was not one of Joehana's pen names. The original publication states that Soekria wrote the story, and Joehana served only as an editor. The Indonesian scholar of Sundanese literature Ajip Rosidi writes that the language in the book is clearly that of Joehana, and if someone named Soekria did come up with Rasiah nu Goreng Patut, it was only the core plot elements. However, he questions whether Soekria existed: the name had previously been used for the son of Eulis Atjih in Tjarios Eulis Atjih (The Story of Eulis Atjih) (Rosidi 2013, p. 12).) this film was made with a single-system camera that Krugers had obtained with the help of his Society of Motion Picture and Television Engineers membership. It is generally considered the first locally produced sound film released in the Indies. (Note: The Singapore-based Sinologist Leo Suryadinata writes that The Teng Chun's 1931 production Boenga Roos dari Tjikembang was first (Suryadinata 1995, p. 43), while the Indonesian film historian Misbach Yusa Biran suggests that The's film was released after the Wong brothers' Indonesia Malaise, and therefore after Karnadi Anemer Bangkong (Biran 2009, p. 137).) Criticized for having poor technical quality, the film was also controversial for its plot; the contemporary director Joshua Wong suggested that this poor reception was partly owing to the main character eating a frog, something which is forbidden for Muslims.

Following this failure, Krugers made the documentary Atma de Vischer (1931), which followed Queen Wilhelmina and Prince Hendrik on a trip through The Hague. He then signed with Tan's Film, with whom he made two films. First he directed and produced Huwen op Bevel (Forced to Marry; 1931), (Note: The film was also advertised with the Malay-language title Terpaksa Menika (Forced to Marry) (De Indische Courant 1931, Centraal-Theater).) which was advertised as featuring songs and comedy but was a commercial failure. He was later tasked with cinematography on Bachtiar Effendi's 1932 sound film Njai Dasima, an adaptation of G. Francis's 1896 novel Tjerita Njai Dasima (Story of Njai Dasima). Tan's Film closed after the release because of rising production costs. Krugers is recorded as planning a further two films, De Nona (Of Ladies) and Raonah, but neither was made.

During 1934 and early 1935, all feature films released in the Dutch East Indies had been produced by The Teng Chun. The Great Depression had led to the Dutch East Indies government collecting higher taxes, advertisers asking for more money, and cinemas selling tickets at lower prices; this ensured that there was a very low profit margin for local films. During this period cinemas in the country mainly showed Hollywood productions. Amidst these economic pressures, which had led him to declare bankruptcy on 12 October 1932, Krugers faced criticism for the poor quality of his sound films. Krugers also experienced legal trouble, being charged with subverting the film censorship bureau by reinserting excised scenes into Karnadi Anemer Bangkong, though he was ultimately acquitted.

In 1935, Krugers left the Indies with his family. He travelled to Hong Kong, where he entered negotiations to join a local film production company. His prospective business partner died during the dinner at which they were to sign the contract. Facing financial hardship, Krugers and his family quickly left for the Netherlands aboard a Nippon Yusen steamer, using the remainder of their savings to ensure passage. In the Netherlands, Krugers operated his own construction and contracting agency, but continued to experience financial difficulties, again declaring bankruptcy in 1945. He died in The Hague on 10 August 1964.

== Legacy ==
The Life and Times of G. Krugers (2017), a film by Krugers's son Jan

All but one of Krugers's films are lost. (Note: Such loss of films is common for films produced in the Indies. These works were recorded on highly flammable nitrate film, and after a fire destroyed much of Produksi Film Negara's warehouse in 1952, old films shot on nitrate were deliberately destroyed (Biran 2012, p. 291). As such, the American visual anthropologist Karl G. Heider wrote that all Indonesian films from before 1950 are lost (Heider 1991, p. 14). However, JB Kristanto's Katalog Film Indonesia (Indonesian Film Catalogue) records several as having survived at Sinematek Indonesia's archives, and Biran (2009, p. 351) writes that several Japanese propaganda films have survived at the Netherlands Government Information Service.) Owing to the rapid change in circumstances that resulted in his family leaving Hong Kong, the materials he had brought from the Indies were abandoned. However, Het Groote Mekka-Feest survived. Krugers had kept a copy of the film in Amsterdam, intending to give it to the future queen Juliana. In 1988, Elisabeth donated this copy to the EYE Film Institute. The Krugers family archive is held by the Leiden University Library.

Discussion of Krugers in academia has been sparse. Krugers was recorded in Indonesian history books as early as 1986. The information provided was inconsistent, with the film archivist Misbach Yusa Biran recording two distinct names and cataloguist J. B. Kristanto providing Hong Kong as Krugers's place of birth. In western academia, Krugers's work has received little scholarly attention. It gained increased prominence in 2015, following a screening of Het Groote Mekka-Feest at Leiden University; the film has been identified as the first cinematic documentation of the Hajj.

== Filmography ==
Key
†	Indicates film is extant

The films of George Krugers
Film	Year	Role(s)	Ref.
Loetoeng Kasaroeng (The Mystical Monkey)	1926	Cinematographer	
Eulis Atjih	1927	Director	
† Het Groote Mekka-Feest (The Great Mecca Feast)	1928	Director	
Karnadi Anemer Bangkong (Karnadi the Frog Contractor)	1930	Director and producer	
Atma de Vischer	1931	Producer, sound director, and cinematographer	
Huwen op Bevel (Forced to Marry)	1931	Director, producer, sound director, and cinematographer	
Njai Dasima	1932	Sound director and cinematographer	

== Works cited ==
- Biran, Misbach Yusa (2009). Sejarah Film 1900–1950: Bikin Film di Jawa [History of Film 1900–1950: Making Films in Java] (in Indonesian). Jakarta: Komunitas Bamboo working with the Jakarta Art Council. ISBN 978-979-3731-58-2.
- Biran, Misbach Yusa (2012). "Film di Masa Kolonial" [Film in the Colonial Period]. Indonesia dalam Arus Sejarah: Masa Pergerakan Kebangsaan [Indonesia in the Flow of Time: The Nationalist Movement] (in Indonesian). Vol. V. Jakarta: Ministry of Education and Culture. pp. 268–93. ISBN 978-979-9226-97-6.
- "Bioscoopnieuws: Cinema Palace" [Cinema News: Cinema Palace]. Bataviaasch Nieuwsblad (in Dutch). Batavia. 14 July 1927. p. 2.
- "Centraal-Theater" [Central Theatre]. De Indische Courant (in Dutch). Surabaya. 15 October 1930. p. 11.
- "Centraal-Theater" [Central Theatre]. De Indische Courant (in Dutch). Surabaya. 17 October 1930. p. 3.
- "Een Indisch Filmspel" [An Indies Film]. De Indische Courant (in Dutch). Surabaya. 5 January 1927. p. 2.
- "Eulis Atjih". filmindonesia.or.id (in Indonesian). Jakarta: Konfiden Foundation. Archived from the original on 2 December 2013.
- "Faillissementen" [Bankruptcy Declarations]. Nederlandsche Staatscourant (in Dutch). The Hague. 25 April 1945. p. 4.
- "Filmnieuws: De Bedevaart naar Mekka en het Mekkaansche Feest" [Film News: The Pilgrimage to Mecca and the Meccan Festival]. Het Vaderland (in Dutch). The Hague. 9 November 1928. p. C2.
- "Filmografi G. Krugers" [Filmography for G. Krugers]. filmindonesia.or.id (in Indonesian). Jakarta: Konfiden Foundation. Archived from the original on 19 March 2026.
- "G. Krugers". filmindonesia.or.id (in Indonesian). Jakarta: Konfiden Foundation. Archived from the original on 19 March 2026.
- Heider, Karl G (1991). Indonesian Cinema: National Culture on Screen. Honolulu: University of Hawaii Press. ISBN 978-0-8248-1367-3.
- "Karnadi Anemer Bangkong". filmindonesia.or.id (in Indonesian). Jakarta: Konfiden Foundation. Archived from the original on 2 December 2013.
- "Krügers Vrijgesproken!" [Krügers is Released!]. Bataviaasch Nieuwsblad (in Dutch). Batavia. 30 March 1933. p. 5.
- "Kostelooze Plaatsing Wegens Overmogen" [Placement Free of Charge Due to Incapacity]. Vereenigde Katholieke Pers (in Dutch). Amsterdam. 7 June 1945. p. 2.
- Krugers, Jan (2017). Life and Times of G. Krugers. Jan Krugers.
- "Ontduiking van Film-Censuur. De Zaak tegen den Film-Fabrikant Kreuger" [Working Around the Censors: The Case against the Film Producer Kreuger]. Het Nieuws van den dag voor Nederlandsch-Indië (in Dutch). Vol. 21. Batavia. 25 January 1933. p. 5.
- Ray, Sandeep (2023). "What Did the Haji Jawa See in Mecca? A Film from 1928 as a Primary Source". Historical Journal of Film, Radio & Television. 43 (4): 1023–1049. doi:10.1080/01439685.2023.2193044.
- Reichling, Rukayyah (2022). "A Colonial Gaze on Mecca: Networks Surrounding the First Documentary about the Hajj". Journal of Material Cultures in the Muslim World. 3 (2): 343–366. doi:10.1163/26666286-12340033.
- Rosidi, Ajip (2013) [1983]. "Rasiah nu Goréng Patut-na Joehana" [Joehana's Rasiah nu Goréng Patut]. Rasiah nu Goréng Patut [Secret of the Ugly One] (in Sundanese). Bandung: Kiblat. pp. 5–13. ISBN 978-979-8002-31-1.
- "Scala Bio" [Scala Theatre]. Sumatra Bode (in Dutch). Padang. 30 December 1930. p. 3.
- Suryadinata, Leo (1995). Prominent Indonesian Chinese: Biographical Sketches. Singapore: Institute of Southeast Asian Studies. ISBN 978-981-3055-03-2.
- Susanto, A. Budi (2003). Identitas dan Postkolonialitas di Indonesia [Identity and Postcolonialism in Indonesia]. Yogyakarta: Kanisius. ISBN 978-979-21-0851-4.
- "Tan's Film". Encyclopedia of Jakarta (in Indonesian). Jakarta City Government. Archived from the original on 21 September 2010.
- Woodrich, Christopher (23 November 2017). "Power and Adaptation: Film Adaptations from Novels in 1950s Indonesia". Cinema Poetica. Jakarta. Archived from the original on 19 November 2025.
- Woodrich, Christopher (2018). Ekranisasi Awal: Bringing Novels to The Silver Screen in The Dutch East Indies. Yogyakarta: Gadjah Mada University Press. ISBN 978-602-386-262-7.
