= Eulis Atjih =

1927 film directed by George Krugers

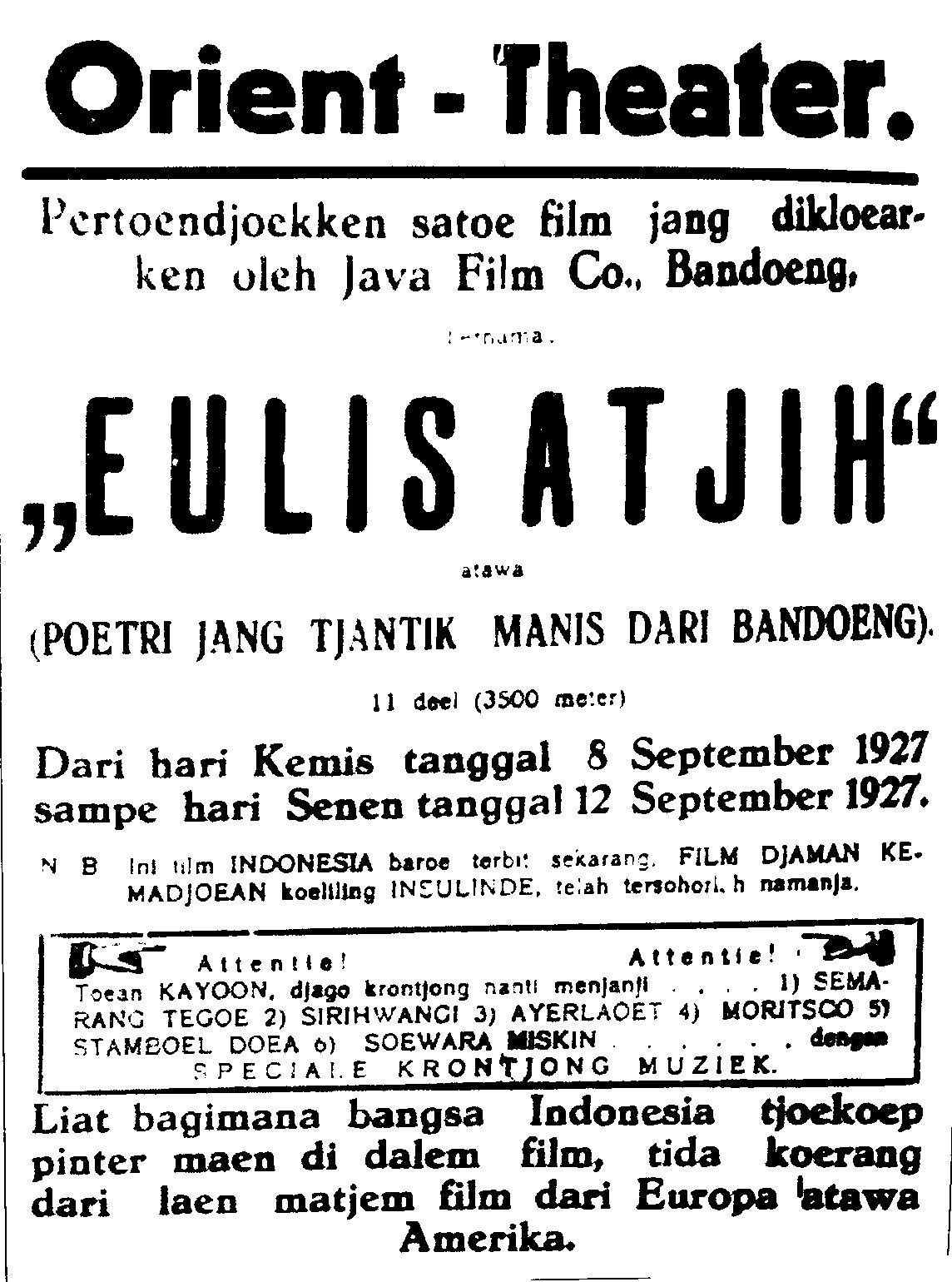
- Newspaper advertisement
- Directed by: George Krugers
- Written by: Joehana
- Starring: Arsad; Soekria
- Production company: Java Film Co.
- Release date: 1927 (Dutch East Indies)
- Country: Dutch East Indies

Eulis Atjih is a 1927 film from the Dutch East Indies (modern-day Indonesia); it was the second feature film produced in the country, after Loetoeng Kasaroeng in 1926. The silent film follows the lives of a native Indonesian family sent into poverty by the husband's splurging. Eulis Atjih was a commercial success in the Indies, but failed in international markets.

== Premise ==
A native Indonesian man leaves his beautiful young wife Eulis Atjih and their child to lead a life of partying. She falls into poverty and, when he returns several years later, he is also poor.

== Production ==
Eulis Atjih was produced by Java Film Co., which had made the first film in the Dutch East Indies, Loetoeng Kasaroeng, in 1926. The earlier film had left Java Film Coy in a poor financial after it underperformed; as such, for Eulis Atjih the company had to find financial backers. The film was directed by George Krugers and based on the novel by Joehana. The film featured native Indonesian actors, including Arsad and Soekria. It was a black and white, silent film.

Eulis Atjih was the second film to include native Indonesians in its cast, and the second feature film produced in the country. The native role was emphasised in the film's promotion; a poster for a screening at the Orient Theatre in Surabaya, for example, wrote that the film's native cast was equal to any American or European one. Of note is the film's use of the word "Indonesia", which was not to be formalised as a preferred term for the archipelago until the Youth Pledge in 1928.

== Themes ==
The Indonesian film historian Misbach Yusa Biran writes that the film educated Dutchmen through its depiction of native Indonesian rites, including funerals and marriage, as well as sent a message to native audiences that splurging would only result in poverty.

== Release and reception ==
Eulis Atjih was released in 1927, being screened in Bandung in August and in Surabaya in September. It was a critical and commercial success in the country, especially among the ethnic Chinese community; the newspaper Pewarta Soerabaja wrote that the actress who played Eulis was "beautiful when her life was carefree, but looked like a villager when she fell poor." (Note: Original: "Pembawa peranan 'Eulis Atjih' terlihat tjanti' saat masih hidoep senang dan air moekanja beroebah seperti orang desa sesoedah djatoeh miskin.") In Surabaya, the film was accompanied by music from the keroncong group under Tuan Kayoon.

For international release, the Java Film Co. and Krugers emphasised the ethnographic aspects of the film. It was shown in Singapore, but was a commercial failure.

== See also ==
- List of films of the Dutch East Indies
