= Indonesian art =

Indonesian art

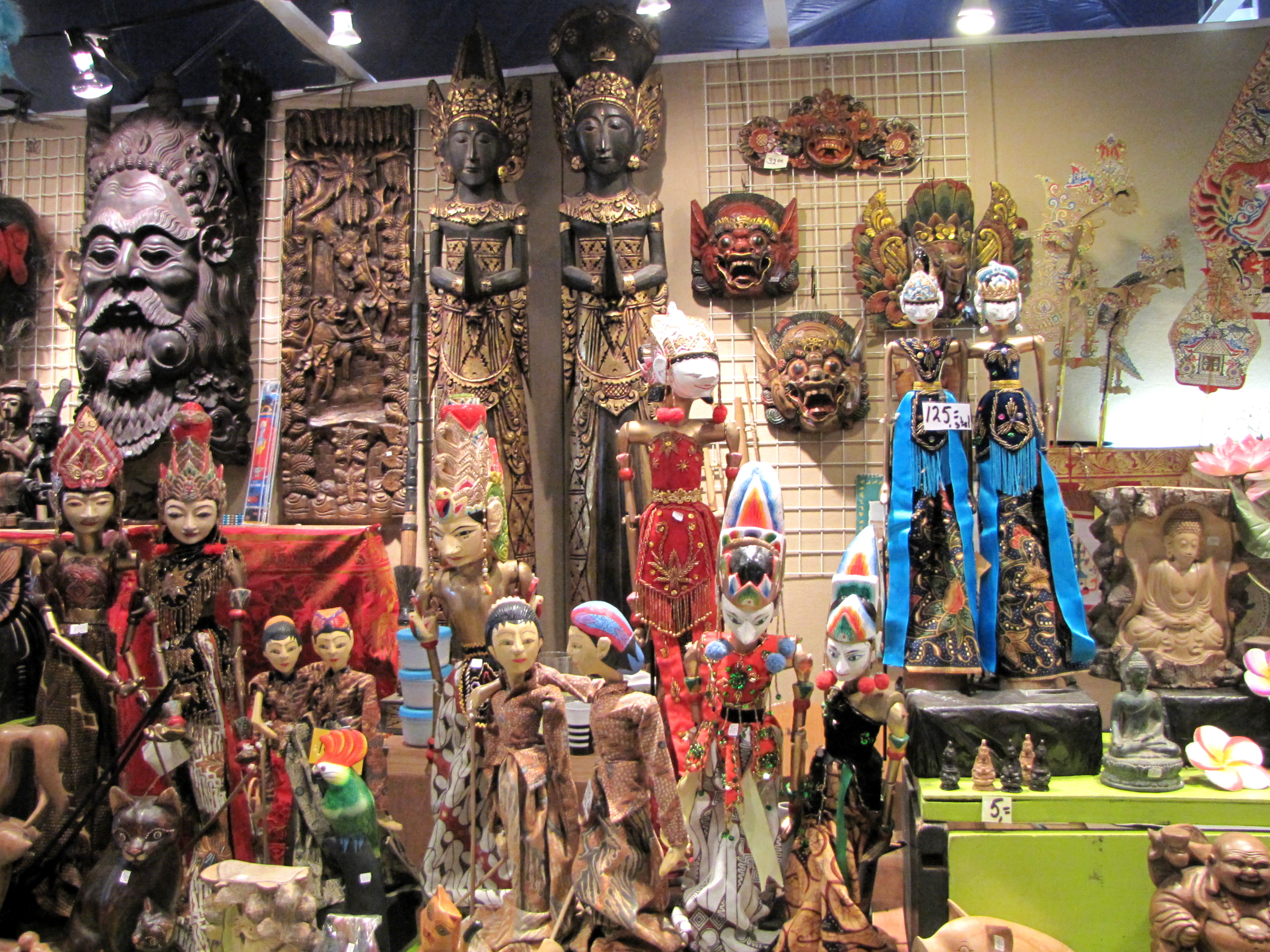
Wood carvings from various parts of Indonesia on display, most notably wayang golek from West Java and Balinese masks and woodcarvings.

Indonesian art takes many forms and is hard to define, as Indonesia is a sprawling archipelago nation of 17,000 islands with a long history that goes back to prehistoric times and is populated by over 600 ethnic groups who speak over 700 languages.

Each period in the history of Indonesia has produced distinctive art, from prehistoric cave paintings and megalithic structures, tribal wooden carving of the Toraja and Asmat people, Hindu-Buddhist art of classical Javanese civilization, Balinese paintings and the Islamic arts of Aceh, to the art of contemporary Indonesian artists.

== Visual art ==
=== Painting ===
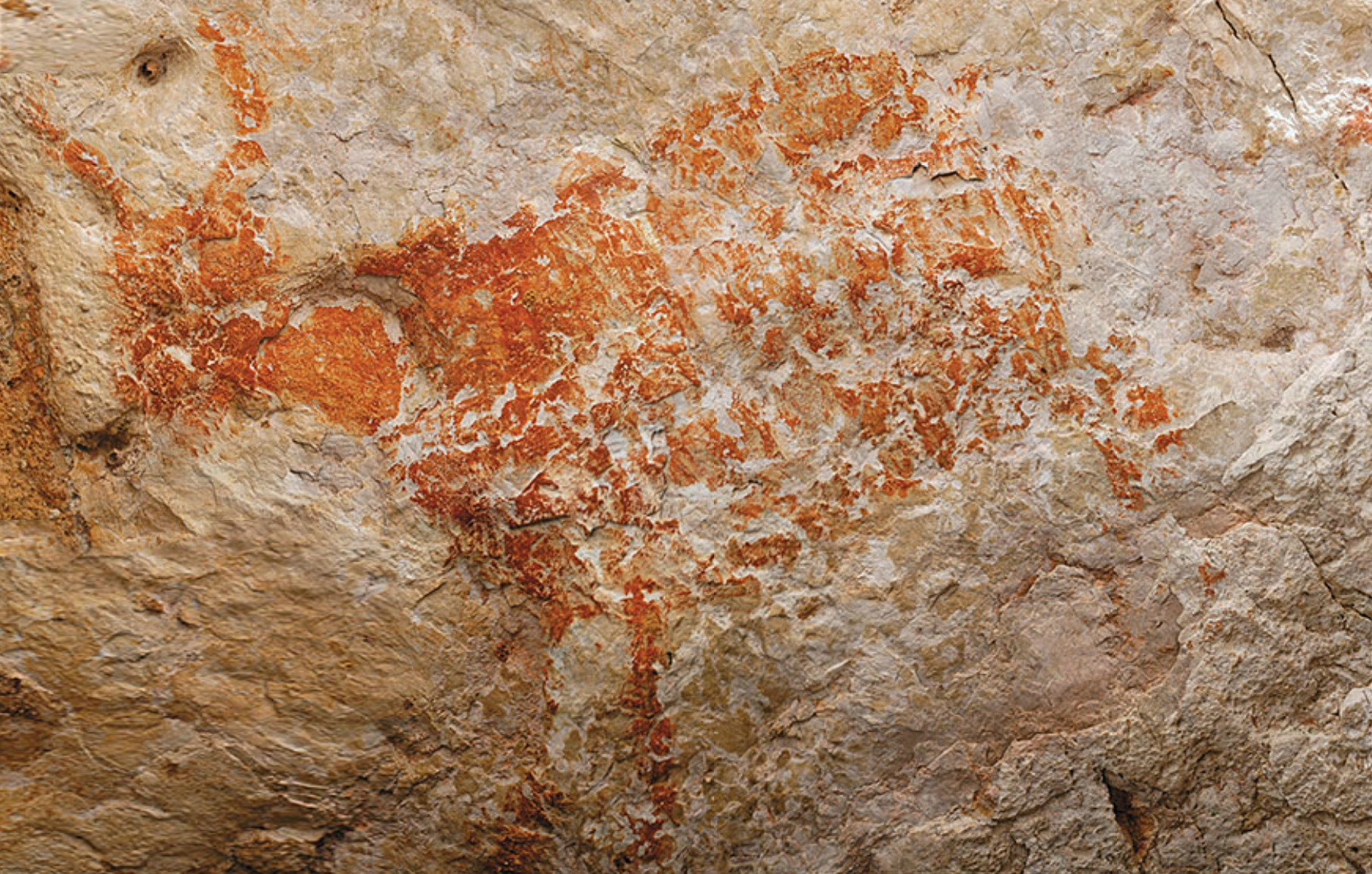
Lubang Jeriji Saléh cave, one of the oldest known figurative paintings in the world, a depiction of a bull, has been dated to be 40,000 years old.

Prehistoric cave paintings were discovered in several sites around Indonesia including the caves of Maros Regency in South Sulawesi, the Sangkulirang-Mengkalihat karst formation in East Kutai and Berau Regency in East Kalimantan. They were estimated to be about 40,000 years old.

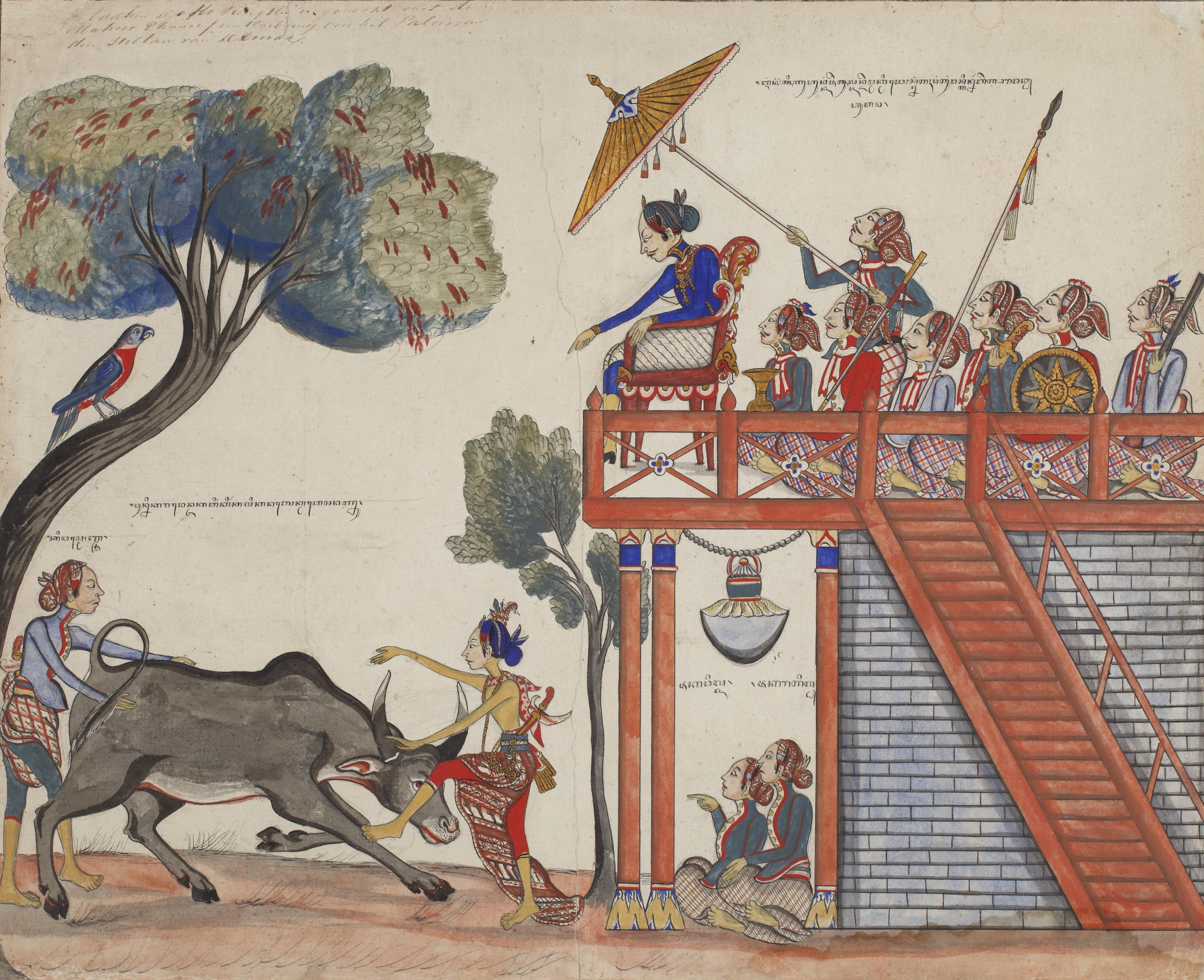
Javanese classical painting, Jaka Tingkir killing a buffalo under watch of the Sultan of Demak (probably Sultan Trenggana), Anonymous Javanese artist

The art of painting is quite well-developed in Bali, whose people are famed for their artistry. The Balinese art paintings tradition started as classical Kamasan or Wayang style visual narrative, derived from East Javanese visual art discovered on East Javanese candi bas reliefs. Balinese painting tradition is notable for its highly vigorous yet refined intricate art which resembles baroque folk art with tropical themes. Ubud and Butuan in Bali are well known for their paintings. Numbers of painter artists have settled in Bali, which in turn developed the island into a world's artists enclave. Balinese painting is also a sought-after collection or souvenir for visitors in Bali.

Modern Indonesian paintings were pioneered by Raden Saleh, a 19th-century Arab-Javanese painter renowned for his romantic-naturalistic work during Dutch East Indies period in Indonesia. A popular genre developed during colonial Dutch East Indies is called Mooi Indië (Dutch for "Beautiful Indies"), which mostly capture the romantic scenes of colonial Indies.

Prominent Indonesian painters in 20th century includes Basuki Abdullah, Lee Man Fong, Willem Jan Pieter van der Does, Ida Bagus Made, Dullah, Affandi, Misbach Tamrin, and Amrus.

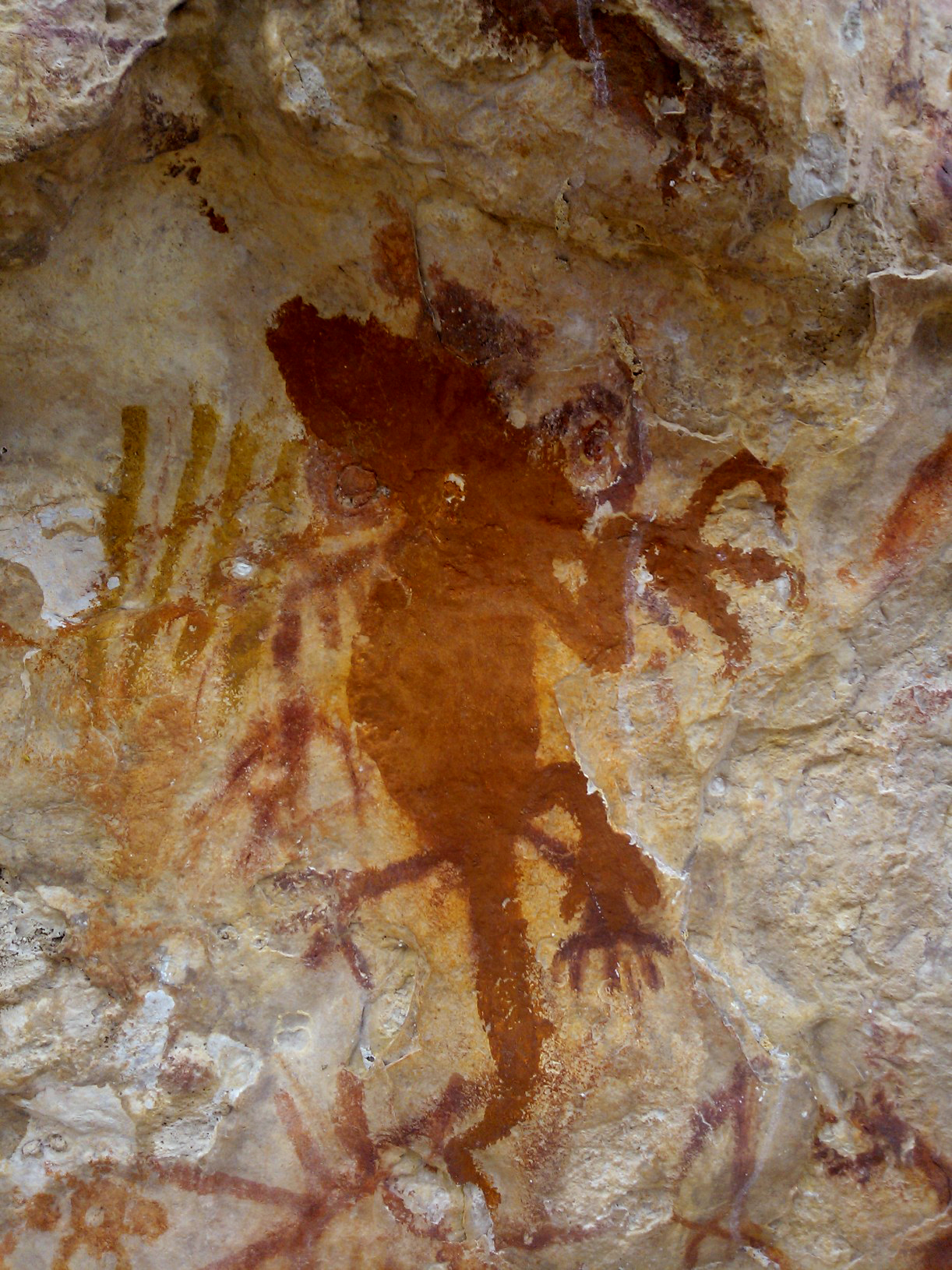
Ancient painting of lizard, one of the oldest cave paintings in Papua, Indonesia

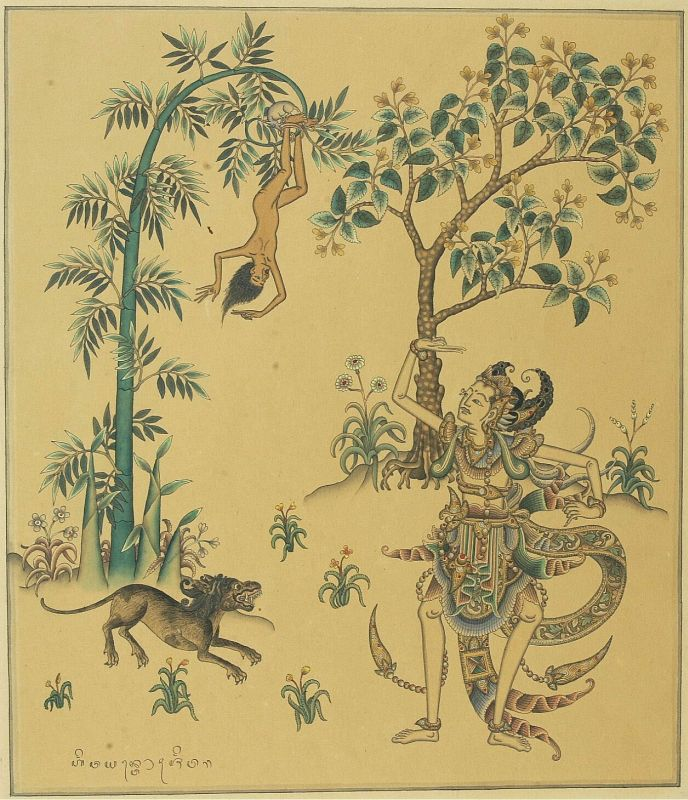
Classic painting, depicting the story of Jaratku

Pre-1920 Kamasan Palindon Painting detail, an example of Kamasan-style classical painting

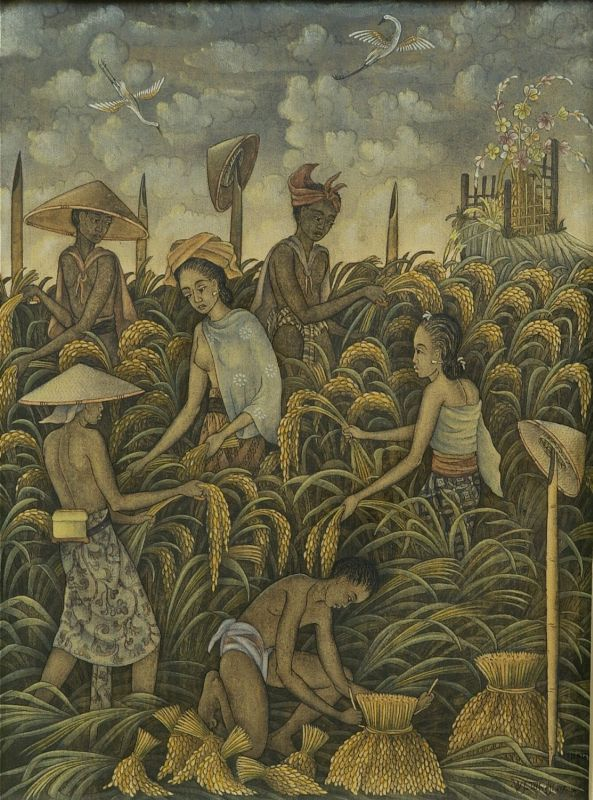
Indonesian women planting rice in Java, W.J. Tohdjiwa

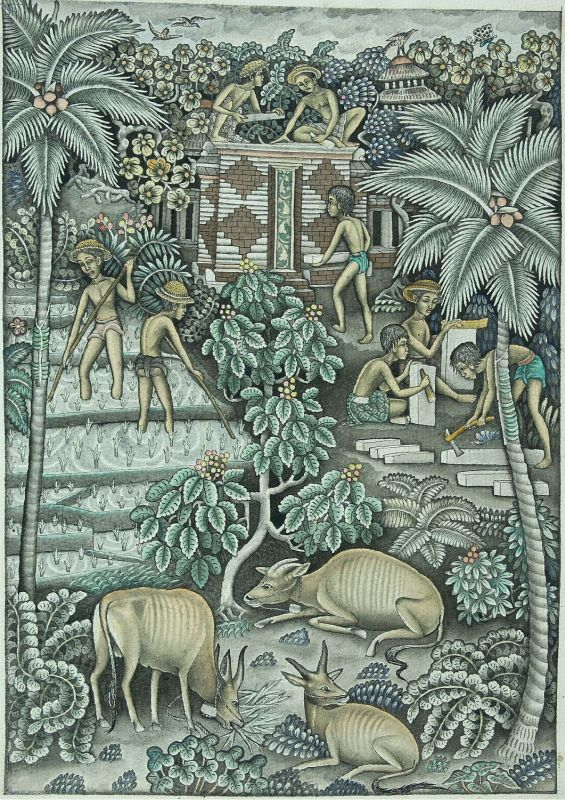
landscape painting of rice fields and buffalo, I. Tomblos

Mask Dancer, A.A. Gde Anom Sukawati, Acrylic on canvas

=== Sculpture ===
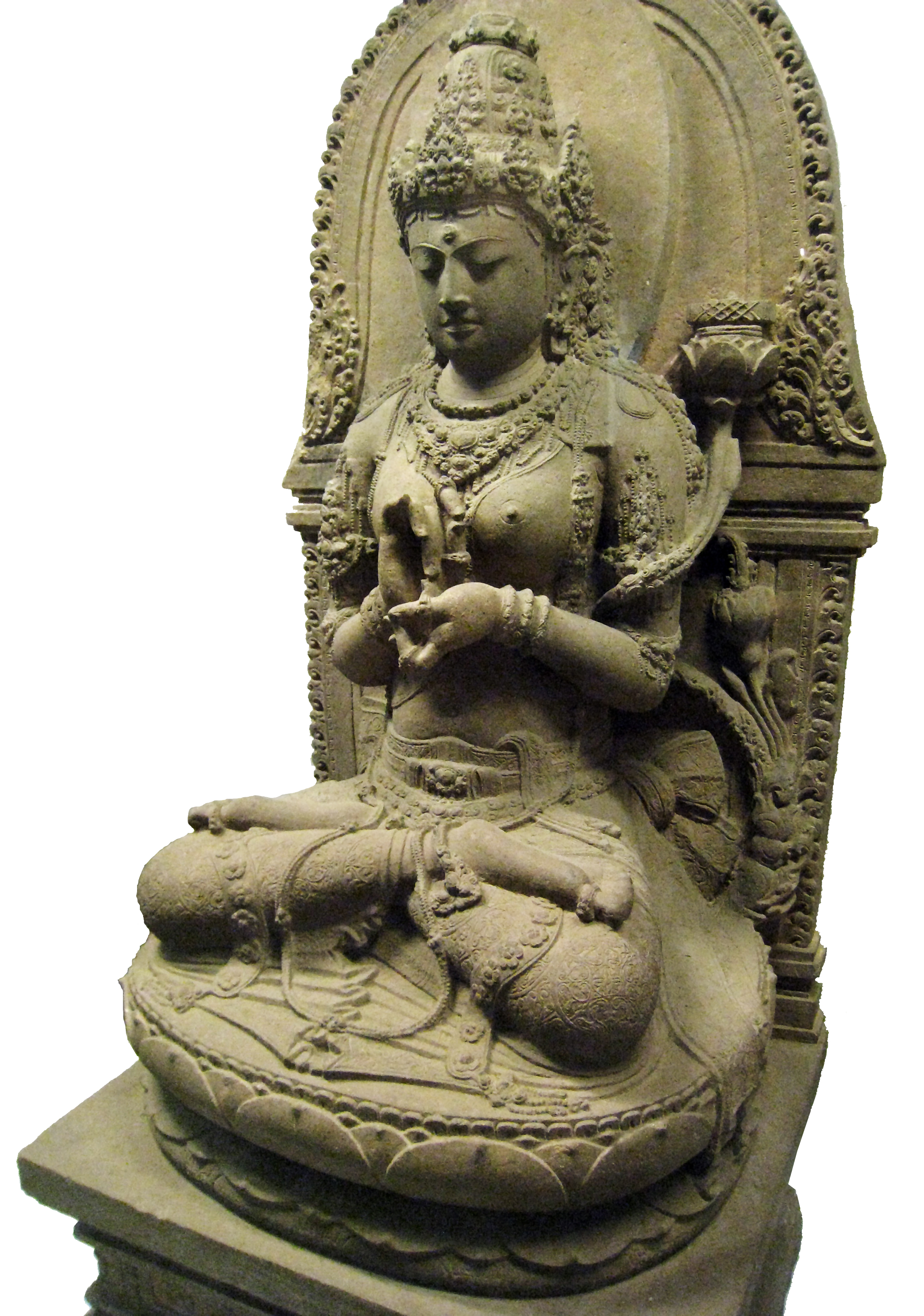
Prajnaparamita of Java statue from East Java

Megalithic sculptures have been discovered in several sites in Indonesia. Subsequently, tribal art has flourished within the culture of Nias, Batak, Asmat, Dayak and Toraja. Wood and stone are common materials used as the media for sculpting among these tribes.

Between the 8th to 15th century, Javanese civilization has developed a refined stone sculpting art and architecture which was influenced by Hindu-Buddhist Dharmic civilization. The celebrated example is the temples of Borobudur and Prambanan. The Shailendra reign of Kingdom of Mataram has also produced multiple temples with its refined sculpture of Hindu and Buddhist deities. A fine example is the Buddhas image of Borobudur with its serene expression, Vairocana flanked by Padmapani and Vajrapani in Mendut temple, also Hindu pantheon of Shiva Mahadewa, Brahma, Vishnu, Ganesha, Durga, Agastya and Nandi in Prambanan temple compound. The Prajnaparamita of Java is a masterpiece of Javanese classical Hindu-Buddhist art, created in 13th century Singhasari in East Java.

The art of wood carving is quite well-developed in Indonesia. Other than tribal art woodcarvings of Asmat, Dayak, Nias, and Toraja area is well known for its refined wood carving culture; they are Jepara in Central Java, and Bali. Mas village near Ubud in Bali is renowned for their wood carving art. Balinese woodcarving today has a sustained tourist market in Bali.

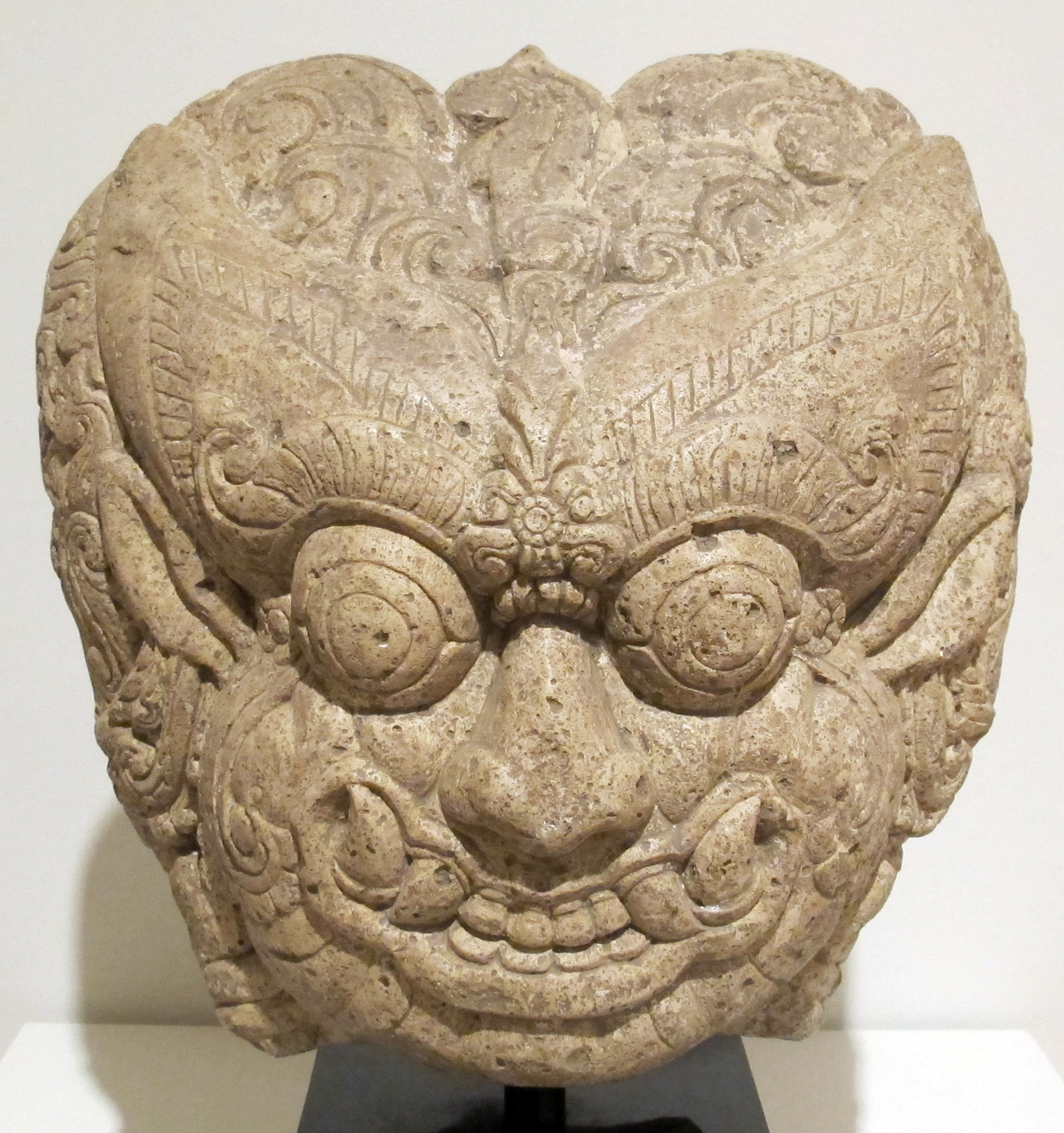
Architectural fragment with a demon's head; 13th-14th century; Philadelphia Museum of Art (USA)

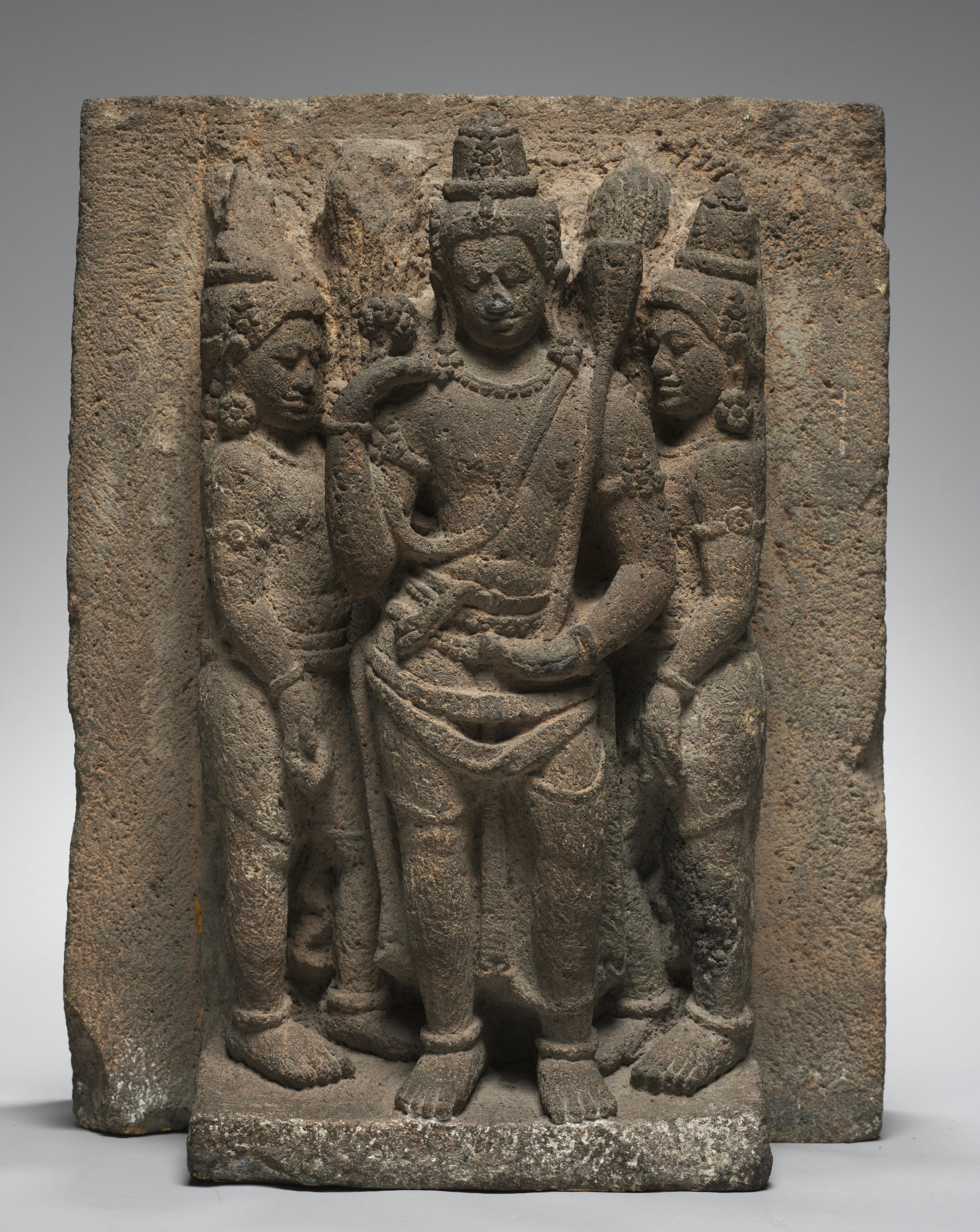
Triad statue taken from Prambanan Hindu temple complex; 10th century from Java, Indonesia; South East Asian Art.

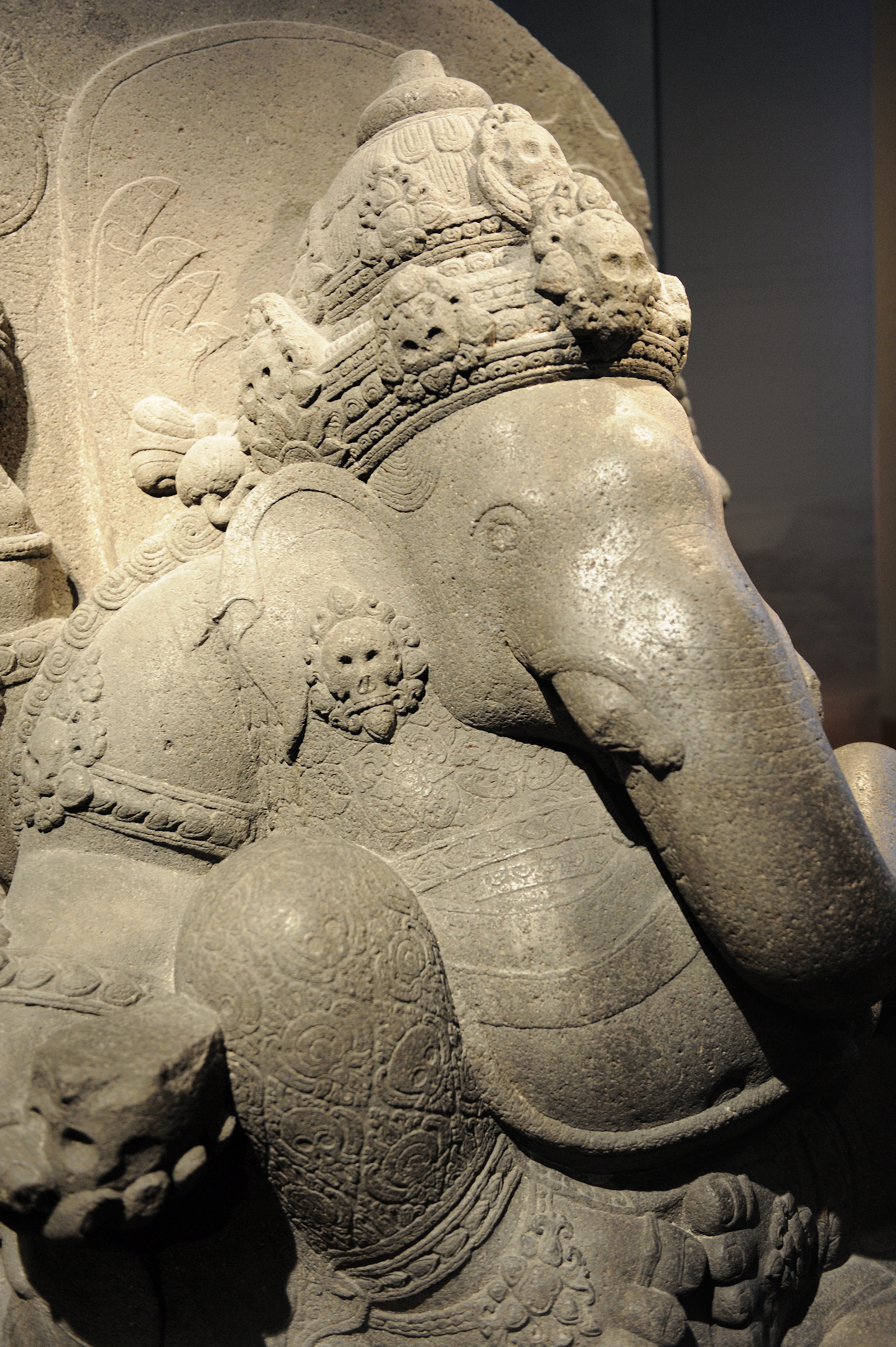
Statue of Ganesha, a Hindu deity; 1275-1300; Museum Volkenkunde, Leiden

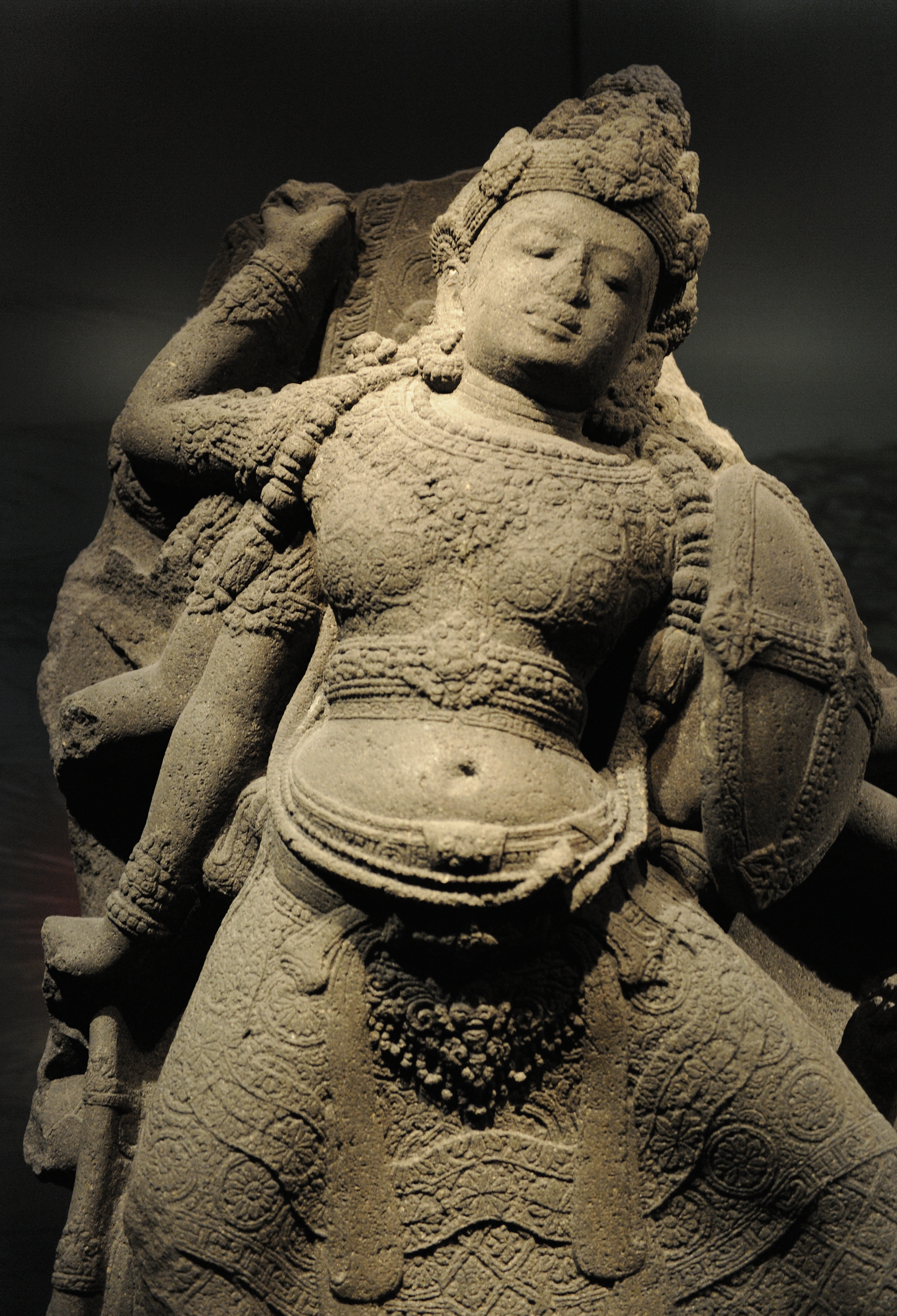
Statue of Durga Mahishasuramardini; 1275-1300; Museum Volkenkunde, Leiden.

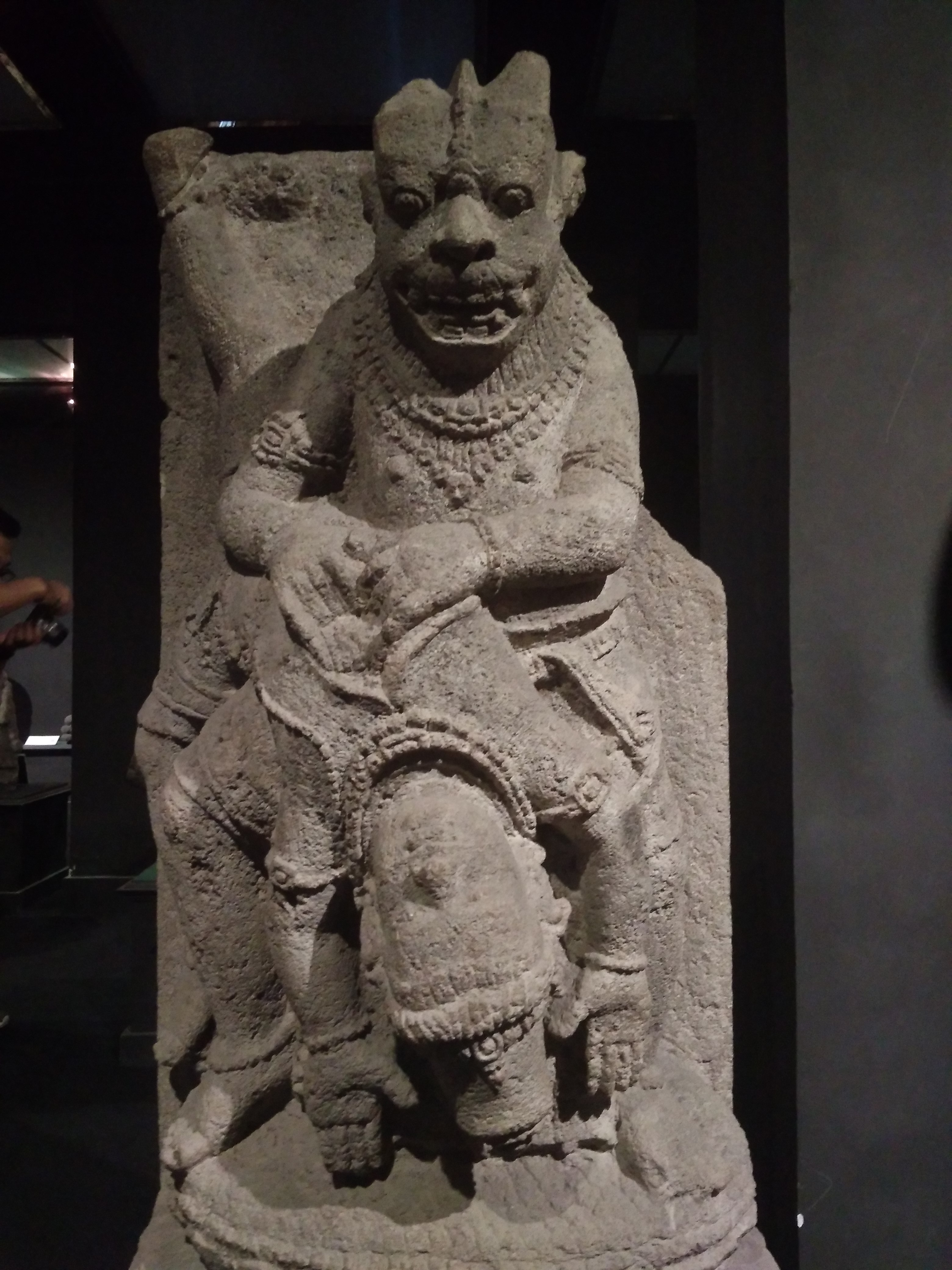
Narasimha statue; 12th century from Java, Indonesia; Institute for Preservation of Cultural Heritage.

=== Cinema ===
The first film produced in Indonesia was the 1926 Dutch East Indies film Loetoeng Kasaroeng, a silent film which was an adaptation of the Sundanese legend of the same name. The Indonesian film industry reached its peak in the 1980s before suffering a significant decline in both quality and quantity in the 1990s. In the 2000s, Indonesian film began to be revived, and in the 2010s, it became a growing industry again: In 2005 the Indonesian film industry produced 33 films, whereas in 2014 it had increased to 99 films per year. In recent years, Indonesian films, especially the genre of silat action movies, have gained worldwide attention, particularly with the popularity of The Raid series.

== Functional art ==
Functional art refers to objects that mainly serve practical purposes. Functional art includes objects related to a human's essential needs and necessities, such as clothing, dwelling, tools and other useful objects, which are often decorated and embellished in ways that do not necessarily serve the functional purpose of the object itself. The main example of daily functional objects that developed into works of art includes textiles and weavings; wicker objects made from plants fibres; and tools and containers, such as bamboo and rattan weaving. One of the most elaborate examples of functional art is the traditional dwelling structures in Indonesian vernacular architecture.

=== Wicker ===
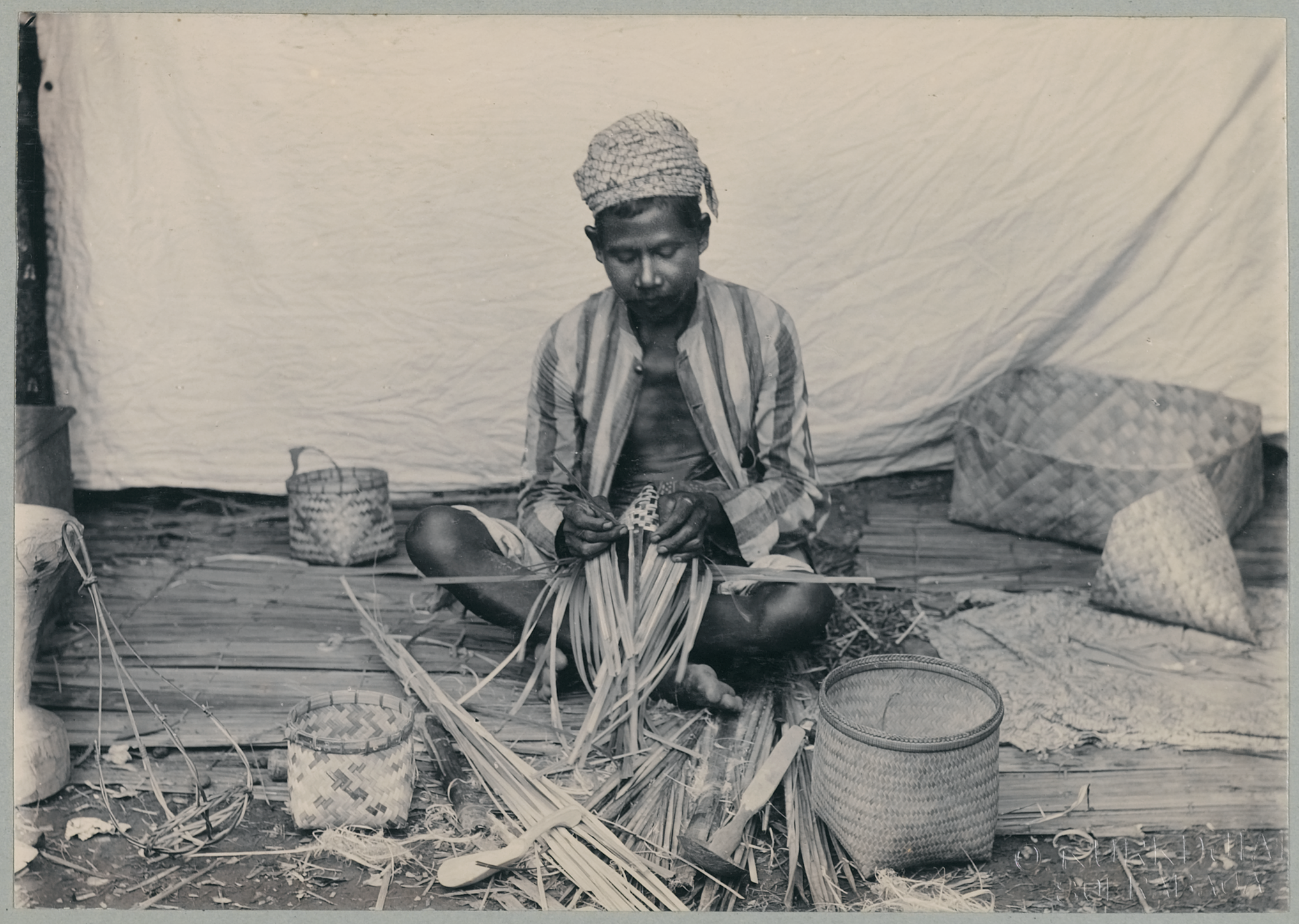
Bamboo weaving, Surabaya c.1906

The need for functional tools and useful things led to creations of various wicker handicrafts; such as containers, bags, hats, to cooking and eating utensils. Wooden materials, coconut shell and plants fibres; such as reed, bamboo and rattan has long been used in traditional weavings in Indonesian traditional society to create tools or containers. Examples include woven noken bag created by native Papuans, Sundanese weaved bamboo containers and cooking utensils, to Dayak and Torajan wicker weaved hats.

As the world's main producer of rattan, Indonesia has quite a well-developed rattan wicker industry and local artistry has been encouraged, producing numbers of wicker rattan furniture. Indonesia is also a leading exporter of rattan wicker furniture products.

=== Textile ===
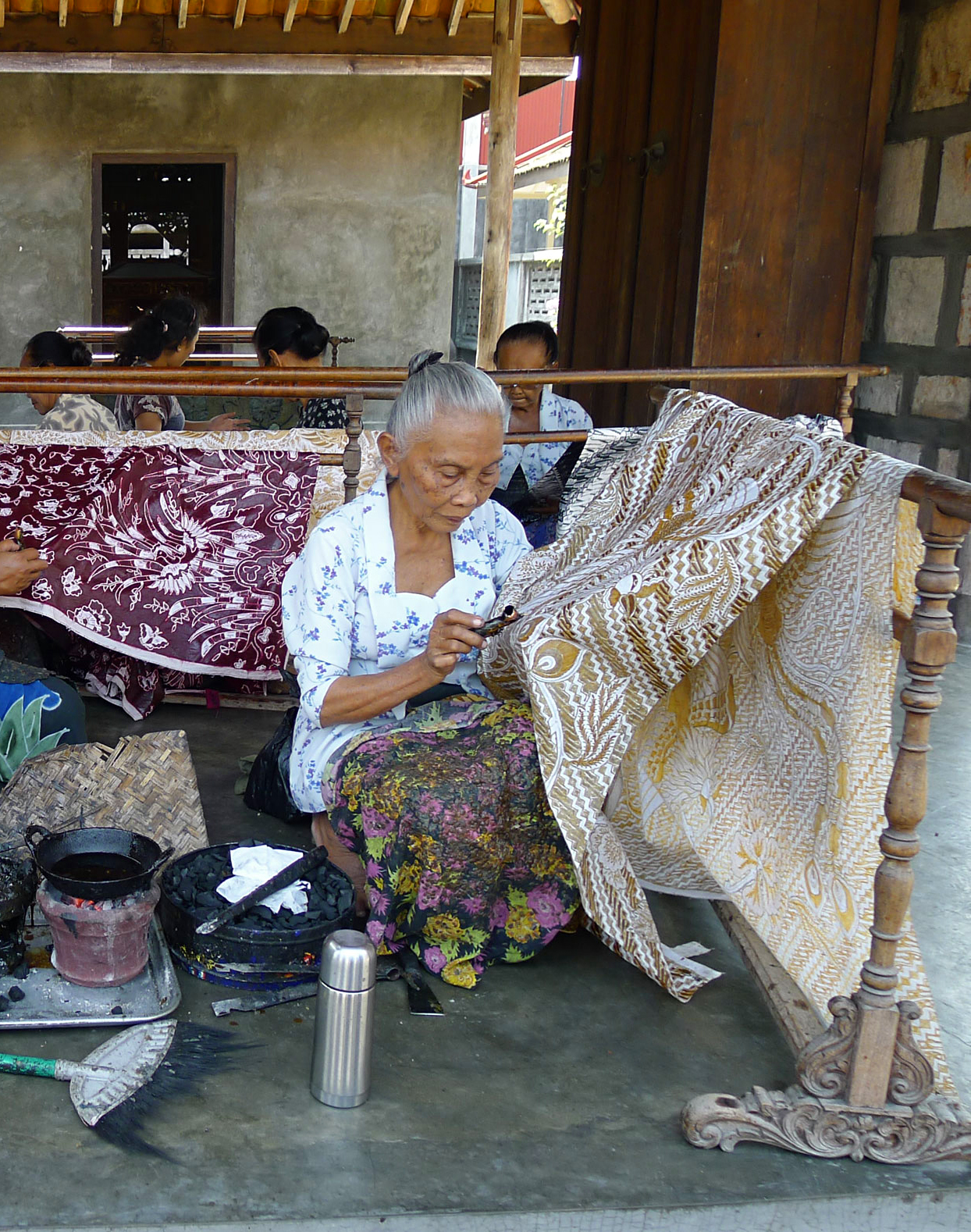
Intricate work of Batik-making in Java

The textiles of Indonesia is diverse; from bark-cloth of Eastern Indonesia to intricately woven tenun fabrics from Sumba. Examples of Indonesian textiles includes batik from Java, to songket and ikat developed in many parts of the archipelago.

Batik, which is an art of wax-resist dyeing which creates intricate motifs, was elevated as a national art form—a national costume of Indonesia, which transcends Indonesian ethnic groups. Numbers of patterns and motifs have been developed, especially in Java, which contains symbolic meanings and significance. Batik cloth and shirts have been worn as formal attire, also often proudly worn as uniforms. In October 2009, UNESCO designated Indonesian batik as a Masterpiece of Oral and Intangible Heritage of Humanity.

=== Weaponry ===
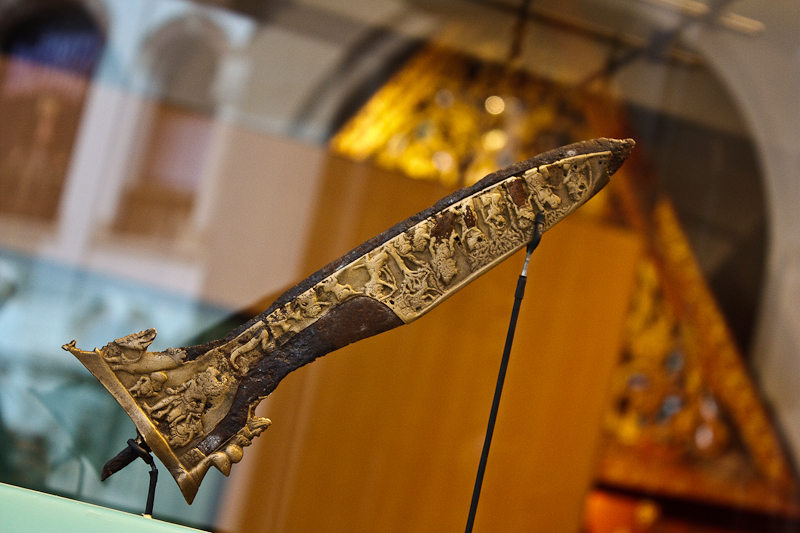
The Kris of Knaud (1342) from Majapahit period.

The kris is an Indonesian asymmetrical dagger with distinctive blade-patterning achieved through alternating laminations of iron and nickelous iron (pamor). The kris is famous for its distinctive wavy blade, although many have straight blades as well. Traditionally worn as a status symbol and carried by warriors for when they lost their main weapon in battle, today it is the main weapon of many martial art styles in Indonesia. Kris is a symbol of power and of ethnic pride in most communities in Indonesian archipelago. Both a weapon and spiritual object, kris are often considered to have an essence or presence, considered to possess magical powers, with some blades possessing good luck and others possessing bad. Kris are used for display, as talismans with magical powers, weapons, a sanctified heirloom (pusaka), auxiliary equipment for court soldiers, an accessory for ceremonial dress, an indicator of social status, a symbol of heroism, etc. Legendary kris that possess supernatural power and extraordinary ability were mentioned in traditional folktales.

Other weapons from Indonesia include the parang, golok, kerambit, mandau, rencong, celurit, klewang, kujang, and badik.

=== Pottery ===
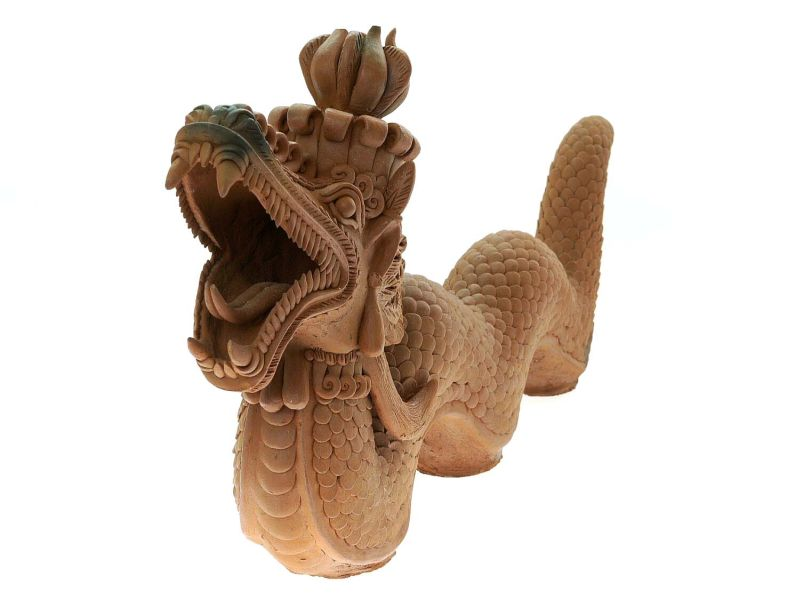
Javanese Naga (dragon), Kasongan terracotta art, Yogyakarta

Pottery was developed in Indonesia as early as 400 BCE in Buni culture in coastal West Java, which produced peculiar pottery with incised, geometrical decorations. It was the first Indian rouletted wares recorded from Southeast Asia. Clay potteries were later developed with evidence found in Anyer to Cirebon. Artefacts such as food and drink containers, dated from 400 BC to AD 100 have been found, mostly as burial gifts.

Circa 13th to 15th century, the Majapahit kingdom developed its terracotta art. Numerous clay and terracotta artefacts have been discovered, especially from Trowulan, Majapahit's former royal capital. Artefacts include figurines, heads figures including male head figure which speculated was the portrayal of Gajah Mada, animal figures, among others, are the famous Majapahit piggy bank, various containers, kendi water containers with peculiar breast-like spout, bas reliefs, floor and roof tiles, to pipe and architectural ornaments. So far no kiln has been found, which suggests that most of the objects are relatively low fired.

The Majapahit terracotta art probably influenced and was preserved in the Kasongan terracotta art, found in Bantul Regency near Yogyakarta and the one in Bali. Kasongan terracotta is well known for its earthenwares, vases and jars, earthen cooking wares, teapot and cups set, human and animal figurines, such as horses and elephants, also rooster piggy bank. Similar earthenware terracotta art also developed in Plered area, near Purwakarta in West Java.

=== Architecture ===
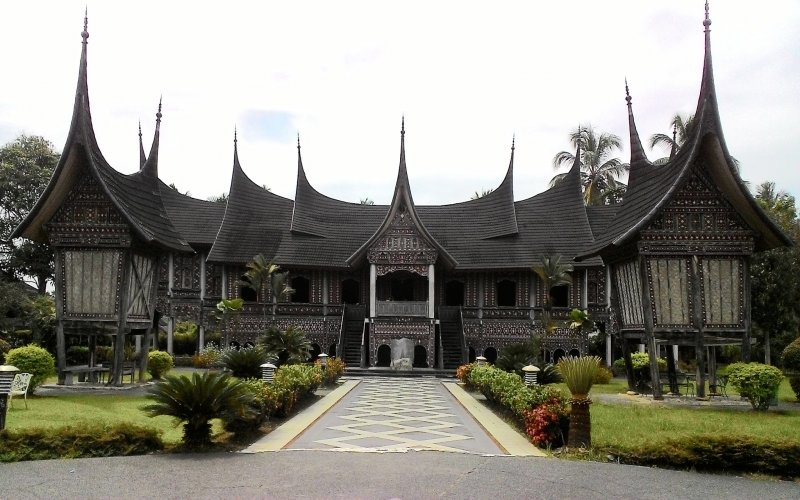
Rumah gadang, a Minangkabau vernacular house with curved horn-shaped roof

The vernacular architecture of Indonesia is diverse and developed according to the traditions, history and influences exposure experienced by each culture or society. They are ranged from simple reeds structure of native Papuan, stilted wooden structure with a prominent roof of Tongkonan and Rumah Gadang, to elaborately carved palace of Java and temple compound of Bali.

== Performing art ==
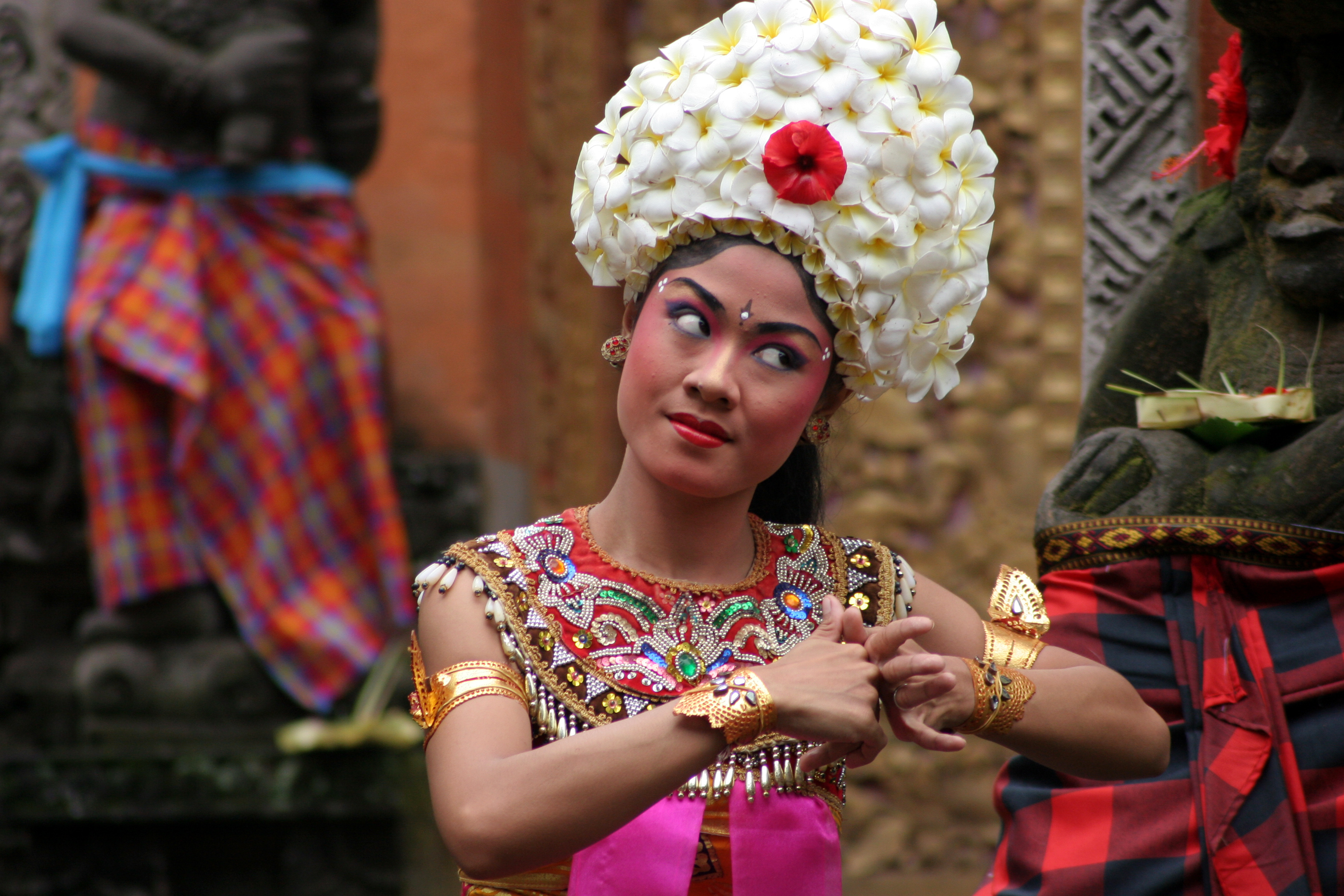
Indonesia has diverse dance traditions, the famous one is Balinese dance that includes body, hands and eyes movements.

Performing arts in Indonesia has its root in rituals and also serves as folks' entertainment. Notable Indonesian performing arts includes ritual dances, dance drama that retelling the ancient epics, legends and stories; also wayang, traditional shadow puppet show.

=== Dance ===
Indonesian dances are tremendously diverse, as each ethnic group has their own dances. This makes total dances in Indonesia are more than 3,000 Indonesian original dances. The old traditions of dance and drama are being preserved in the many dance schools which flourish not only in the courts but also in the modern, government-run or supervised art academies.

For classification purpose, the dances of Indonesia can be divided according to several aspects. In historical aspect it can be divided into three eras; the prehistoric-tribal era, the Hindu-Buddhist era and the era of Islam. According to its patrons, it can be divided into two genres; court dance and folk dance. In its tradition, Indonesian dances can be divided into two types; traditional dance and contemporary dance. Notable Indonesian dances includes Aceh saman; Balinese pendet, legong, barong and kecak; Sundanese jaipongan also Javanese kuda lumping, ronggeng and reog.

=== Drama ===
Dance, drama and traditional music in Indonesia are usually merged as a whole complete of performing artform. The traditional Indonesian dance drama artforms includes; Malay bangsawan; Minangkabau randai; Balinese gambuh, sanghyang and topeng; Javanese wayang wong, ketoprak and ludruk; Betawi lenong; Sundanese sandiwara; also colonial toneel and komedi stambul.

=== Wayang ===
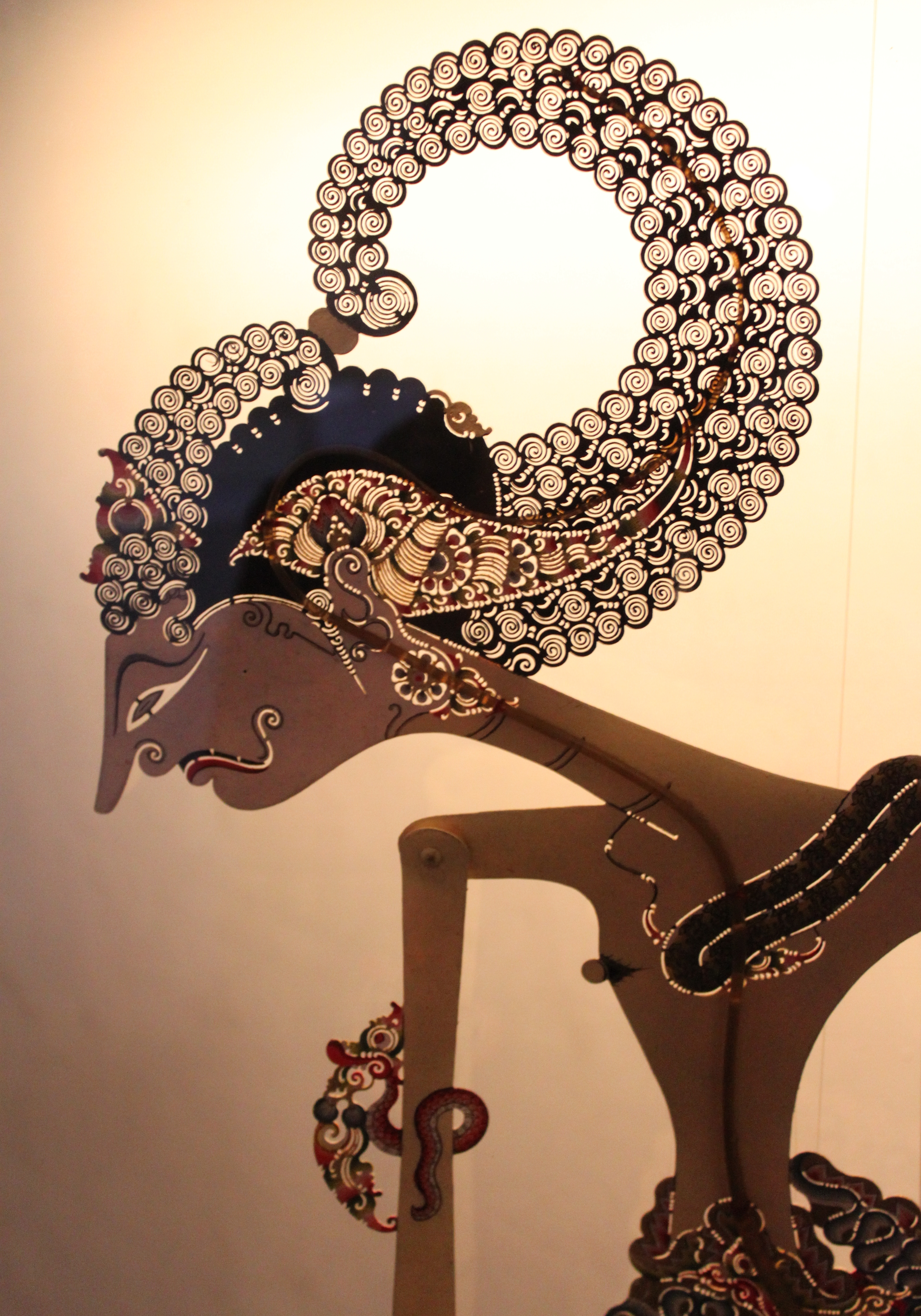
Indonesian Javanese wayang kulit shadow puppet.

Wayang refer to a theatrical performance with puppets or human dancers. When the term is used to refer to kinds of puppet theatre, sometimes the puppet itself is referred to as wayang. Performances of shadow puppet theatre is known as wayang kulit, are accompanied by a gamelan orchestra in Java, and by gender wayang in Bali. It has been developed into a complete and refined art form, especially in Java and Bali. On 7 November 2003, UNESCO designated Indonesian wayang kulit as a Masterpiece of Oral and Intangible Heritage of Humanity. Other wayang artform includes wayang golek and wayang klitik.

== Musical art ==
Indonesian music is also diverse which uses different musical instruments. A well-developed, refined, mainly metalophones traditional orchestra can be discovered in Java and Bali as elaborate gamelan orchestra. Other distinctive musics includes Sundanese angklung and kacapi suling, Minahasan kolintang, Minangkabau talempong, Papuan tifa drum, to East Nusa Tenggara sasando. Indonesian musical genre includes dangdut, campursari, tembang sunda, gambus, to Indonesian rock and pop

== Martial art ==
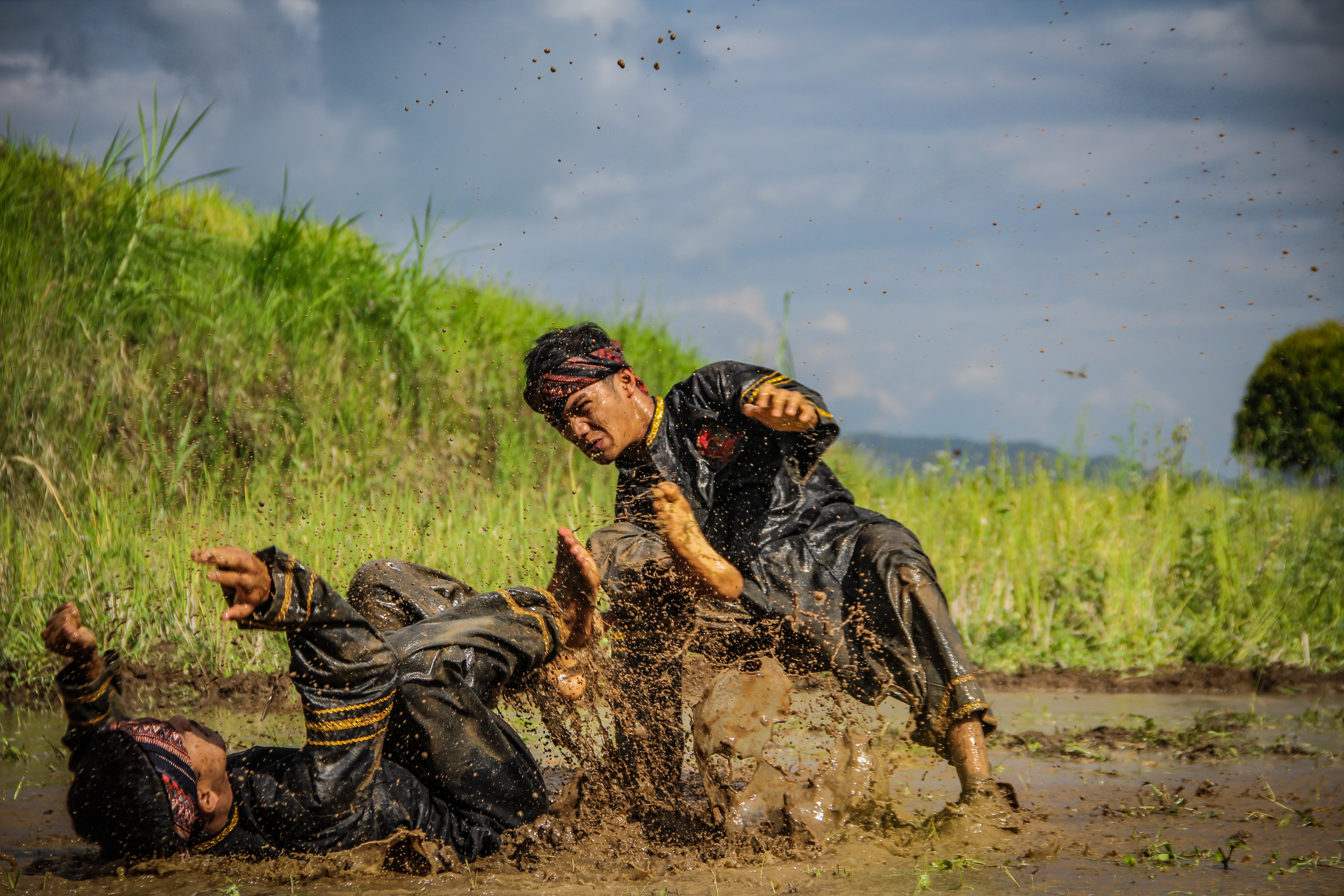
A pencak silat duel

Indonesian martial arts include the variety of fighting systems native to or developed in the Indonesian archipelago, both the age-old traditional arts and the more recently developed hybrid combative. Other than physical training, they often include spiritual aspects to cultivate inner strength, inner peace and higher psychological ends. Indonesian martial arts are synonymous with pencak silat. Nevertheless, a number of fighting arts in Indonesia are not included within the category of silat. Pencak silat styles and movements are as diverse as the Indonesian archipelago itself. Individual disciplines can be offensive as in Aceh, evasive as in Bali, or somewhere in between. They may focus on strikes (pukulan), kicks (tendangan), locks (kuncian), weapons (senjata), or even on spiritual development rather than physical fighting techniques. Many of Indonesian natives have developed unique martial arts of their own.

== Culinary art ==
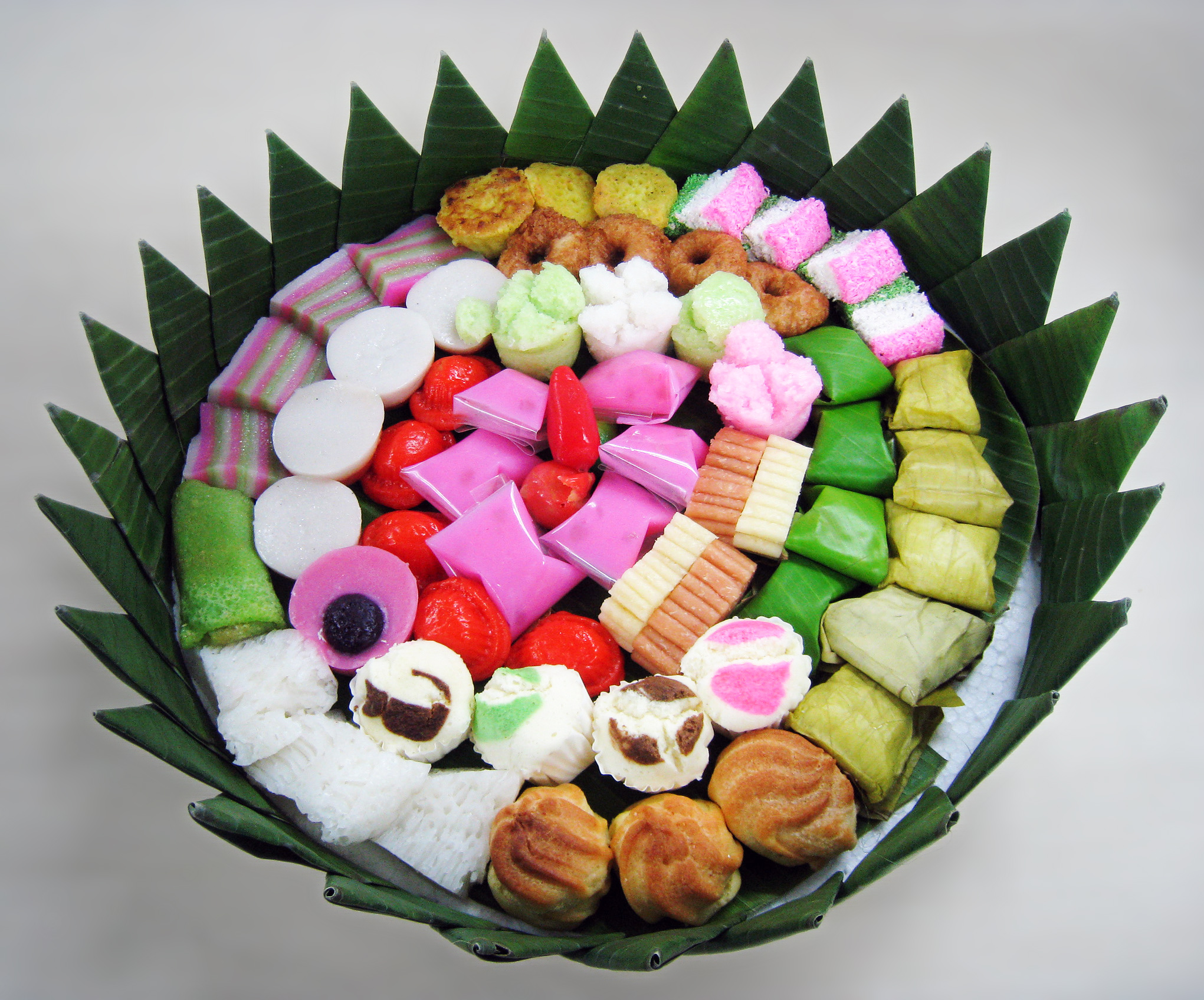
A colourful display of Indonesian kue snacks.

Indonesian cuisine is often described as vibrant, full of intense flavour. Indonesian cuisine varies greatly by region and has many different influences. Acquired from certain ingredients and bumbu spices mixture. Indonesian dishes have rich flavours; most often described as savory, hot and spicy, and also combination of basic tastes such as sweet, salty, sour and bitter. Sumatran cuisine, for example, often has Middle Eastern and Indian influences, featuring curried meat and vegetables such as gulai and kari, while Javanese cuisine is mostly indigenous, with some hint of Chinese influence. The cuisines of Eastern Indonesia are similar to Polynesian and Melanesian cuisine. Elements of Chinese cuisine can be seen in Indonesian cuisine: foods such as bakmi (noodles), bakso (meat or fish balls), and lumpia (spring rolls) have been completely assimilated.

Some popular Indonesian dishes such as nasi goreng, gado-gado, sate, rendang and soto are ubiquitous in the country and considered as national dishes. The official national dish of Indonesia however, is tumpeng, chosen in 2014 by Indonesian Ministry of Tourism and Creative Economy as the dish that binds the diversity of Indonesia's various culinary traditions.

== Gallery ==
Indonesian art

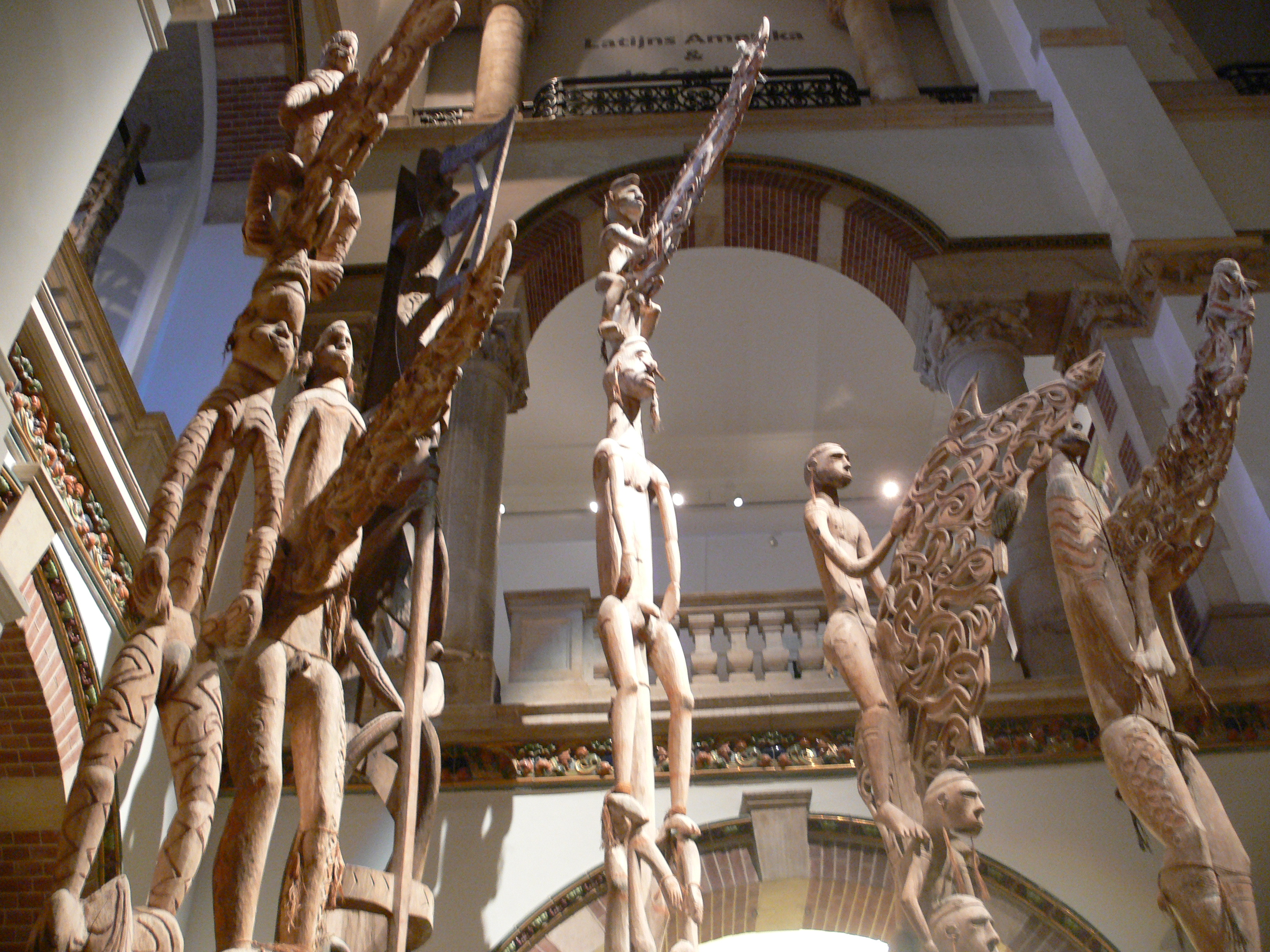
Asmat totem-like bisj poles

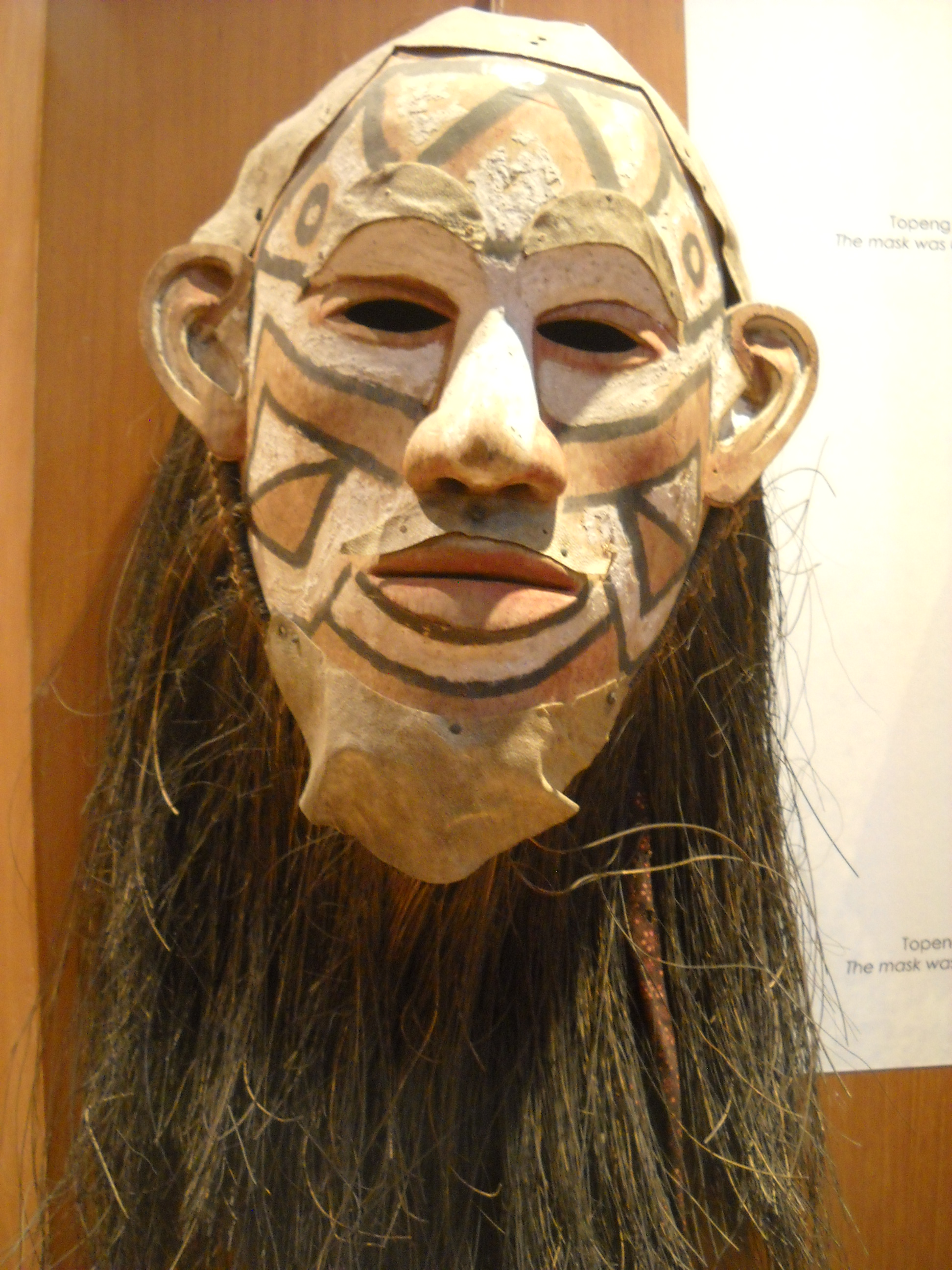
Batak tribal mask

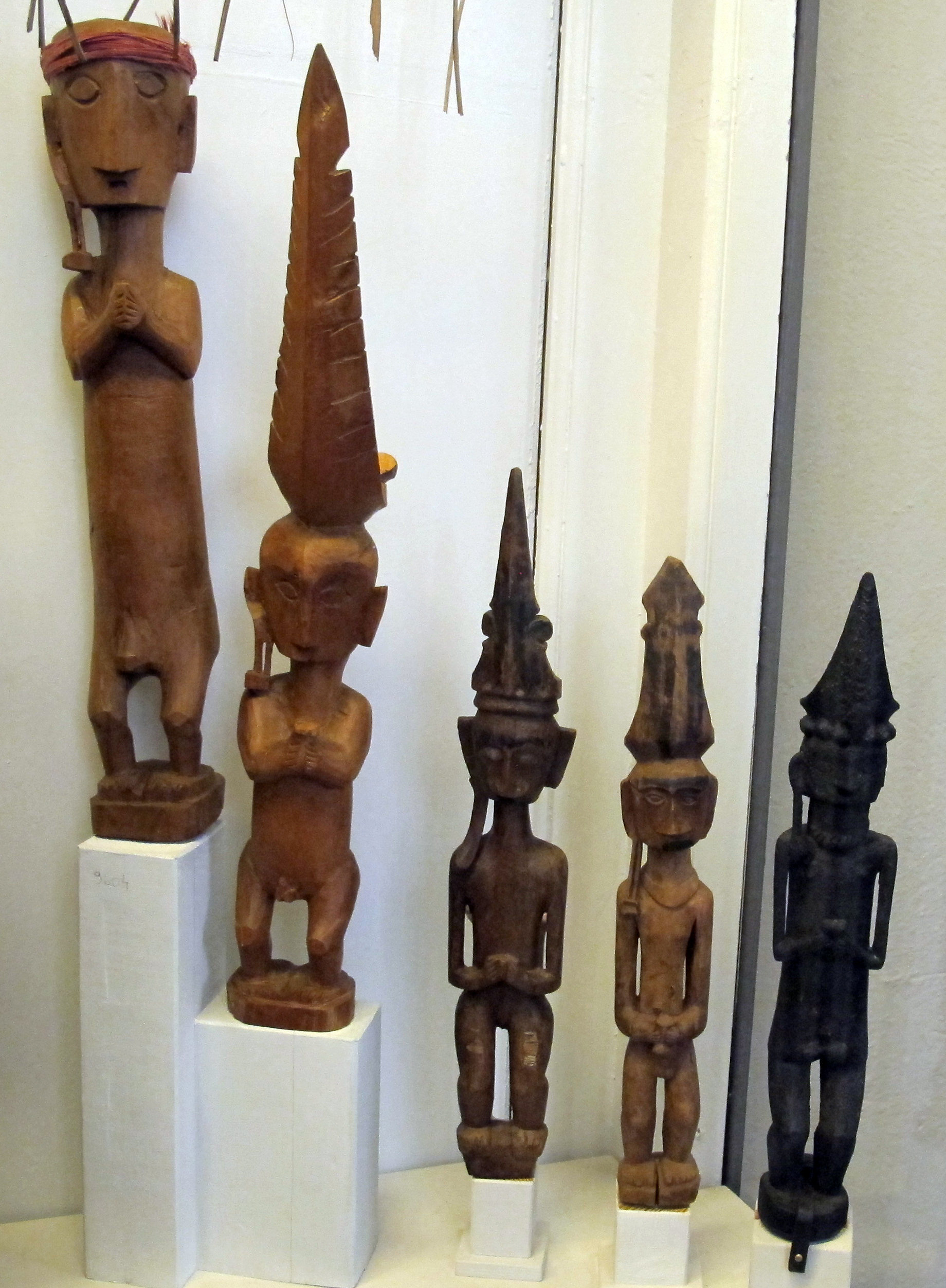
Nias tribal art statues

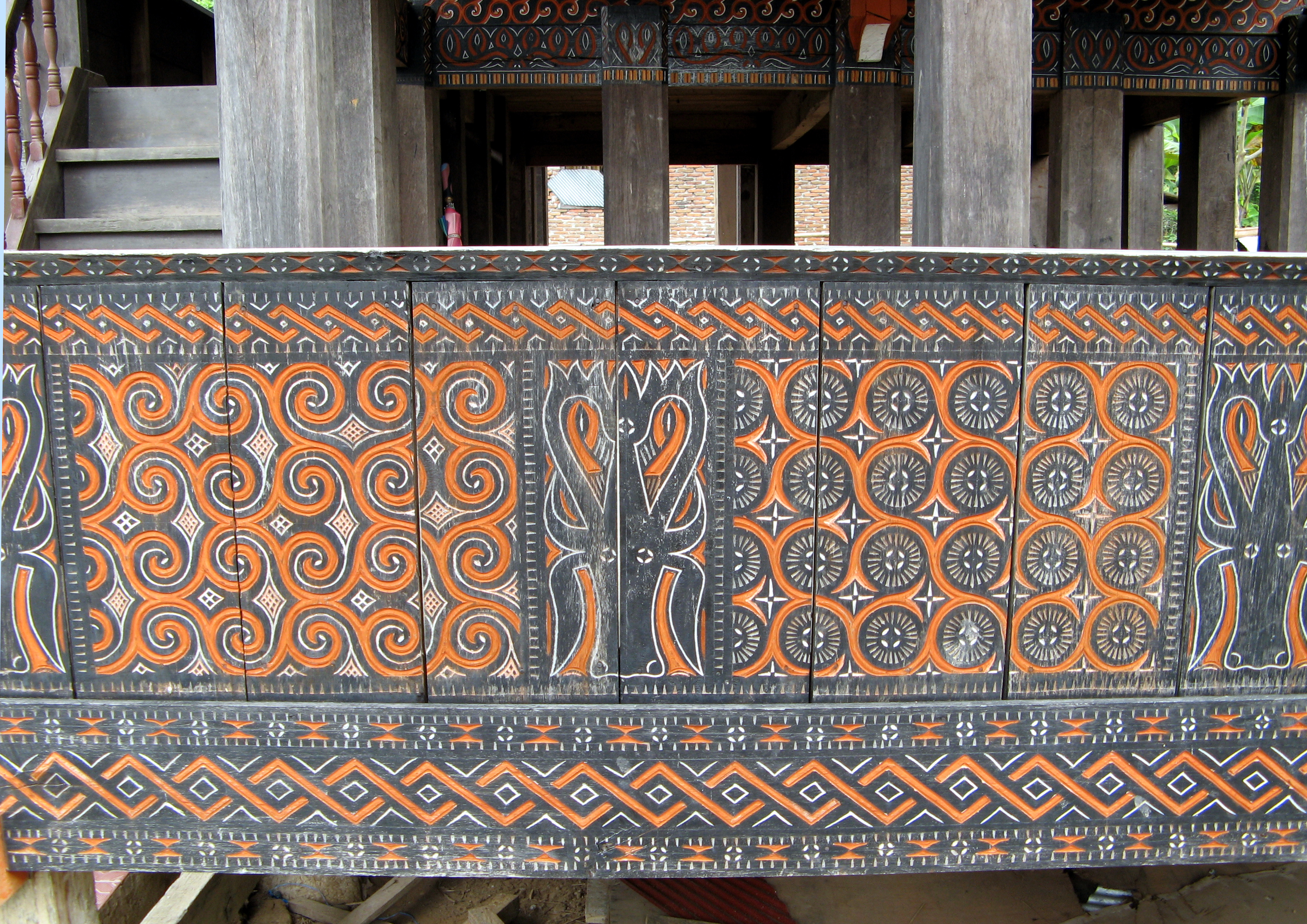
Toraja wood carving

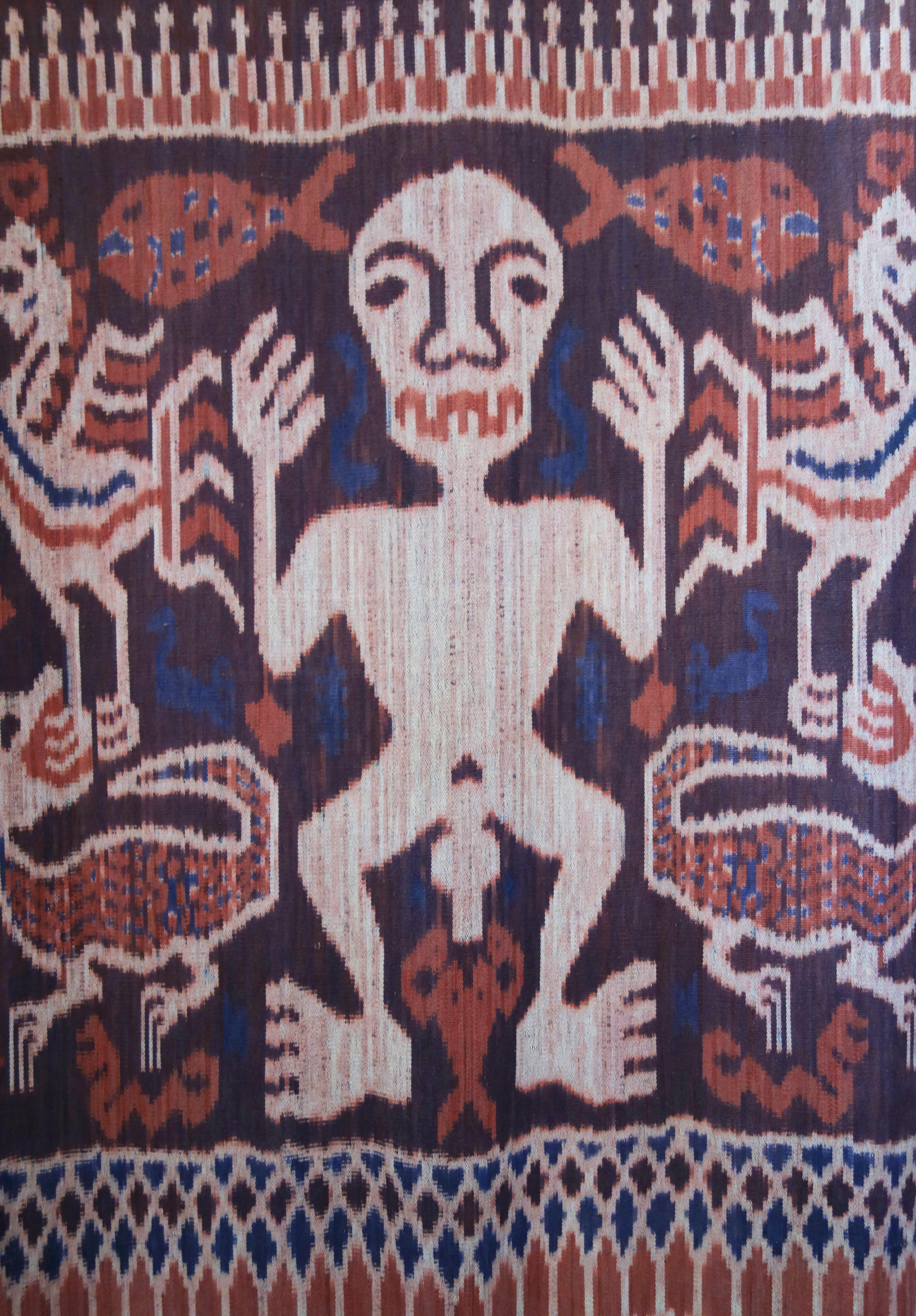
Sumba ikat weaving

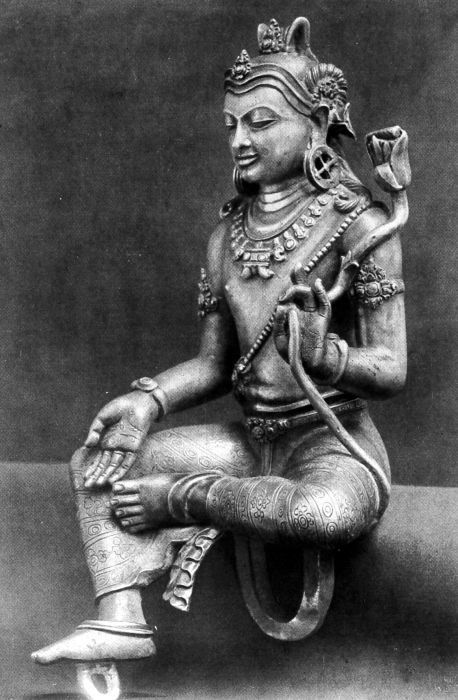
Silver Manjushri, Java art, c. 9th century

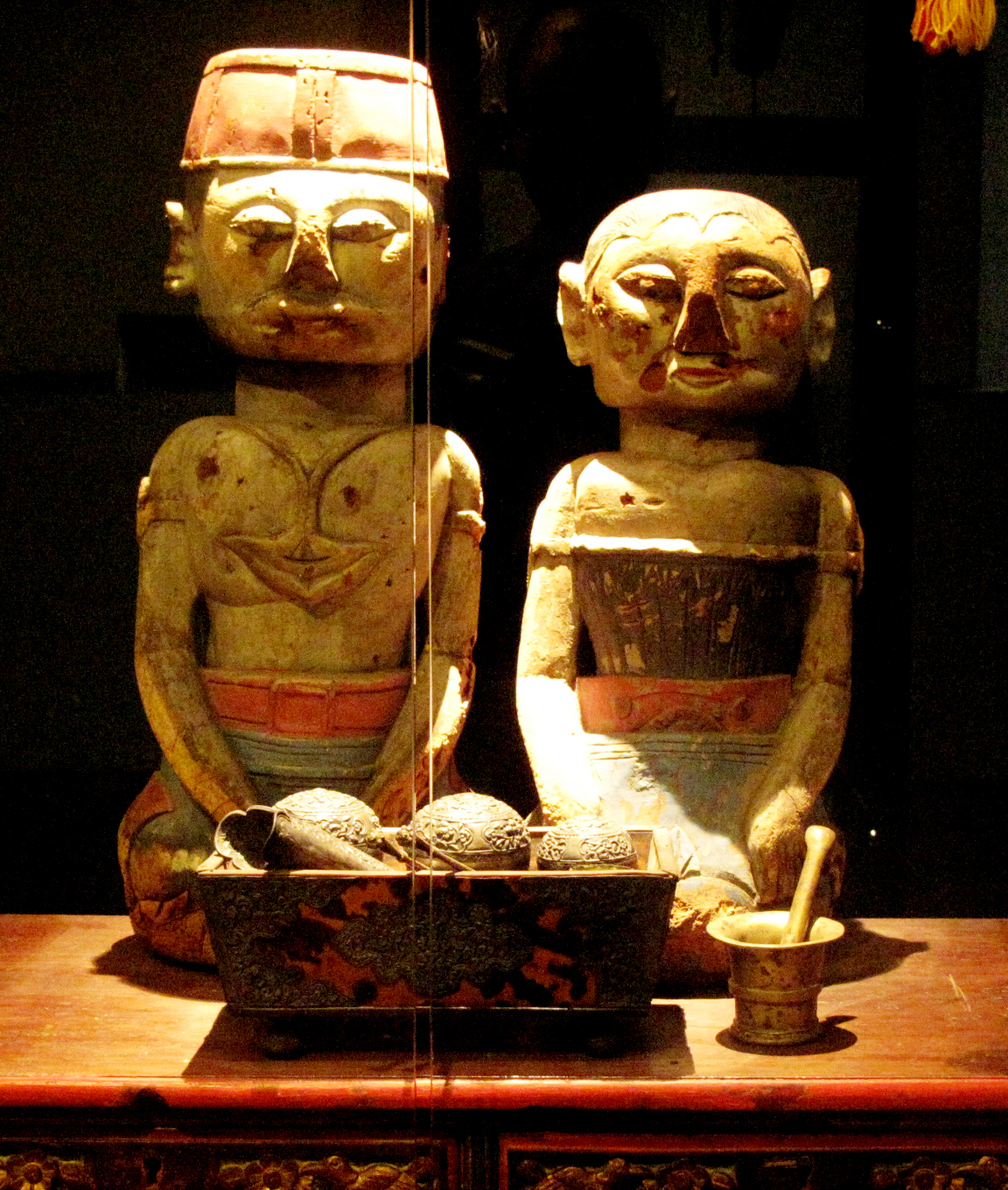
A Pair of Loro Blonyo

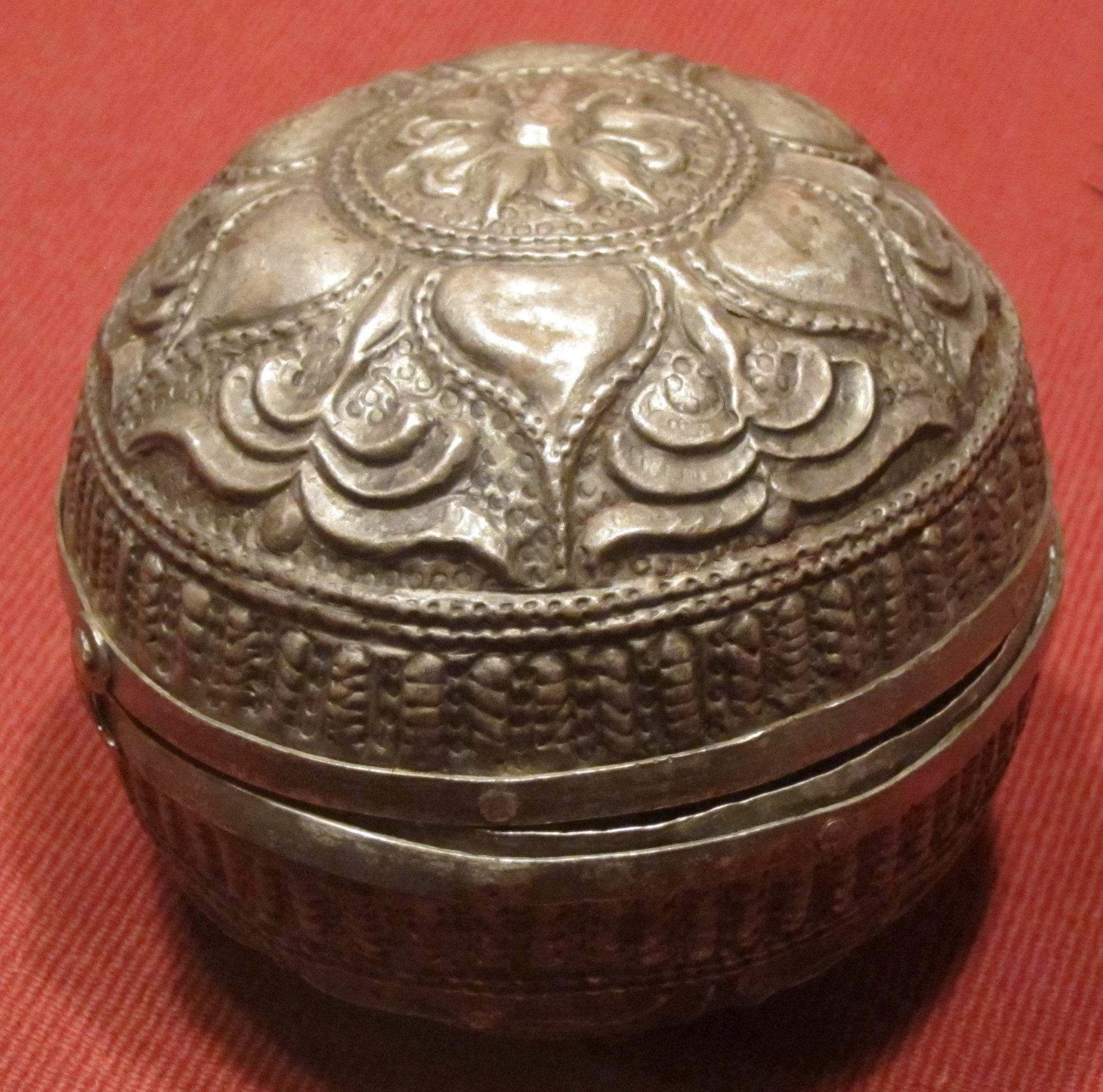
Javanese silverware

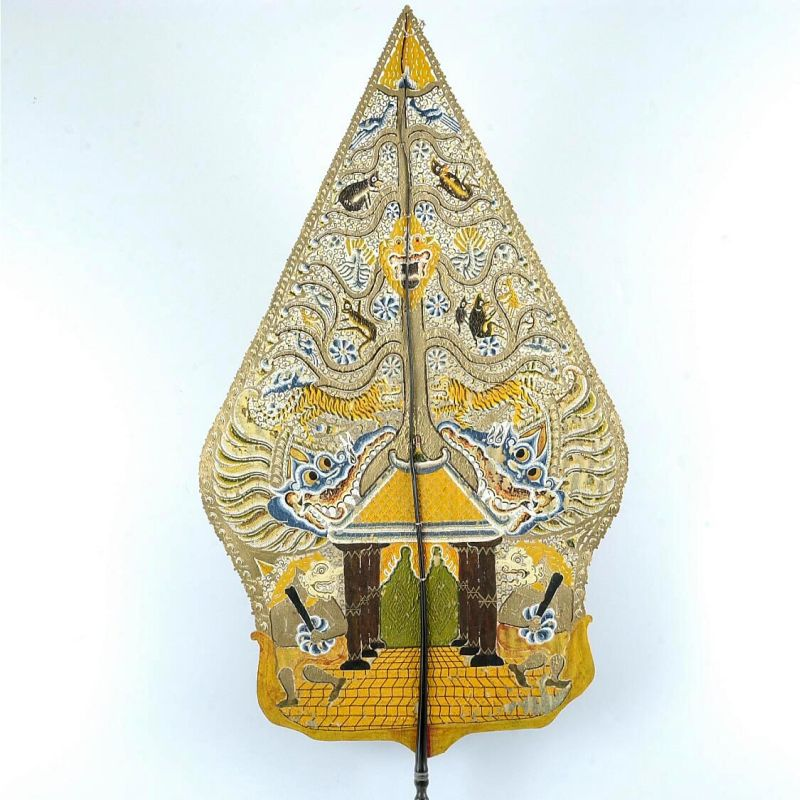
Javanese Gunungan

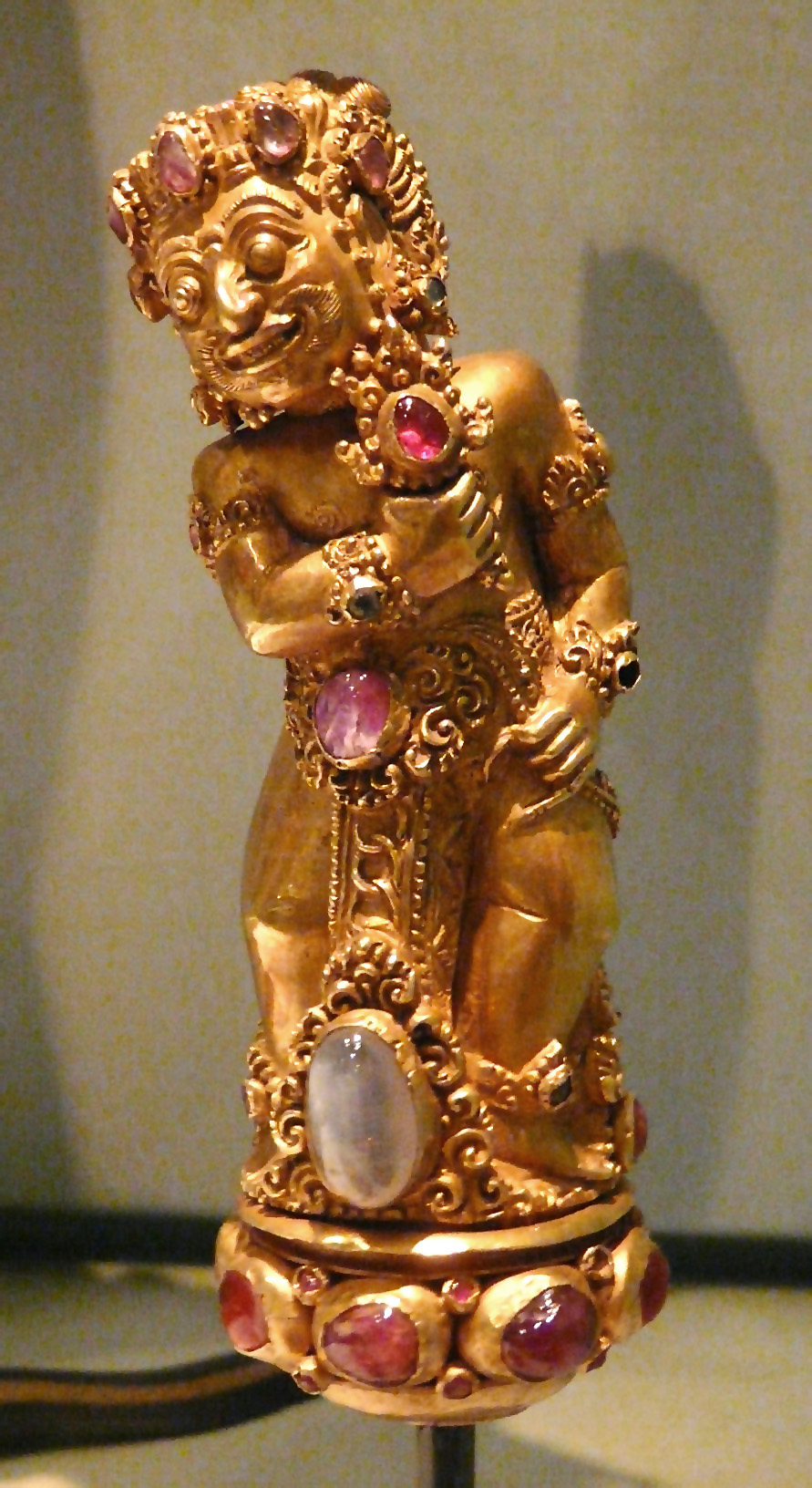
Balinese golden kris hilt, with gems

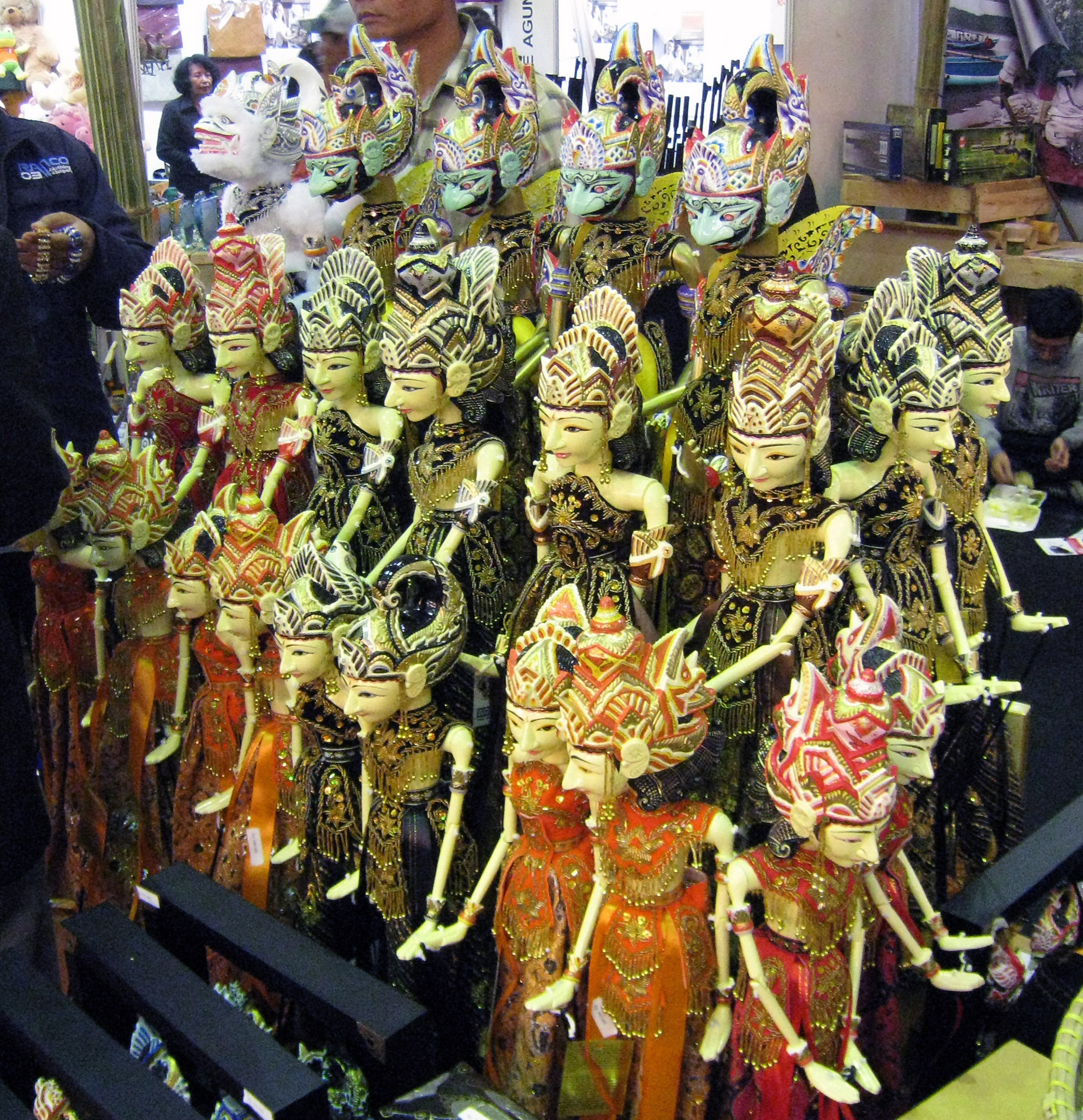
Sundanese wayang golek

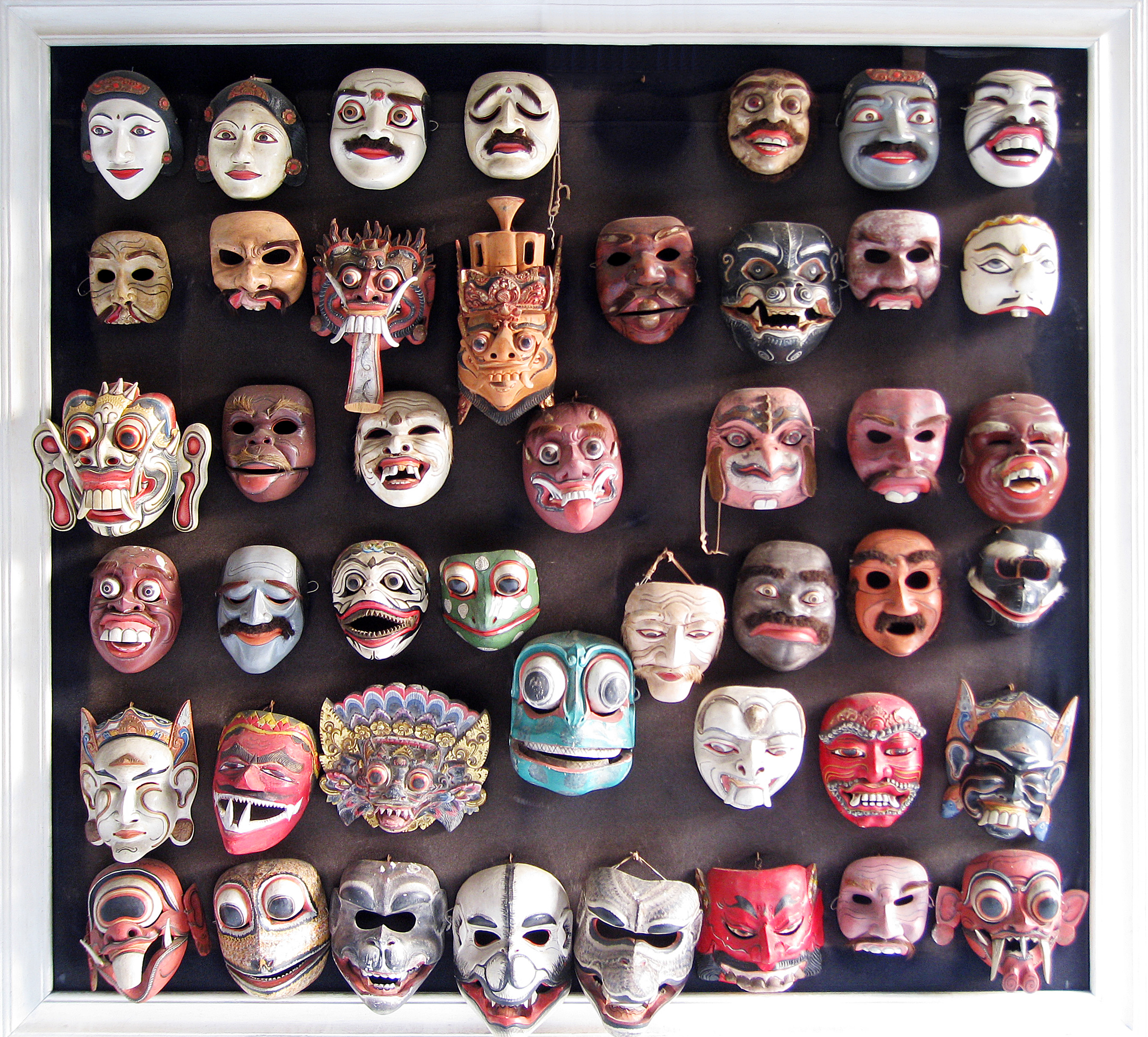
Balinese topeng (masks)

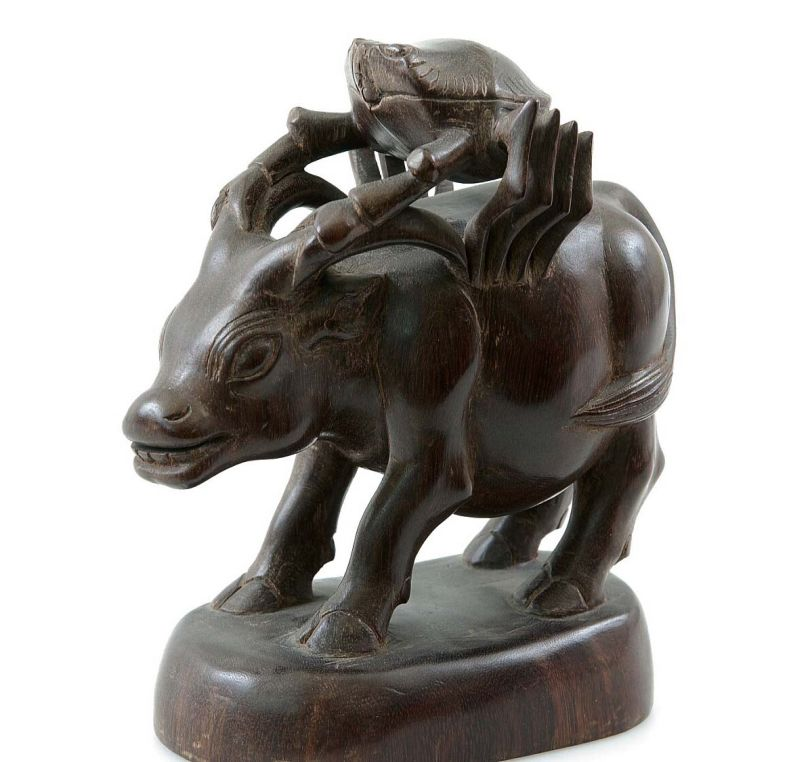
Contemporary Balinese wooden sculpture

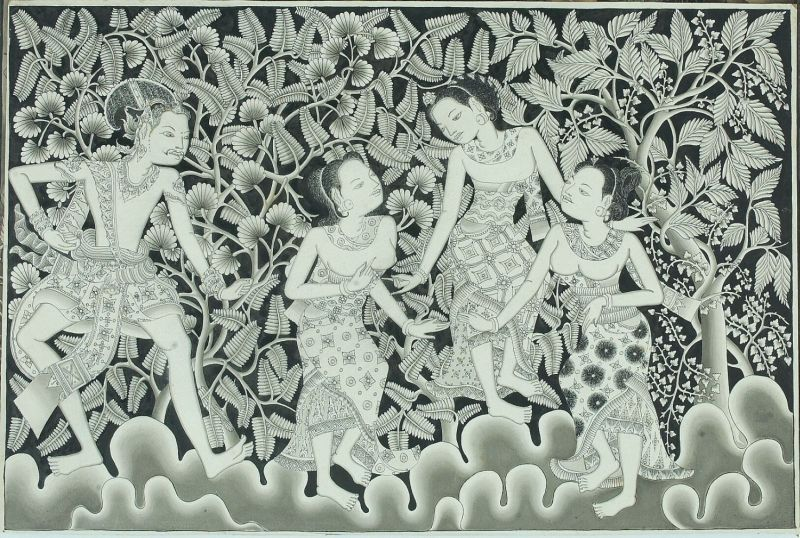
Classic Balinese painting

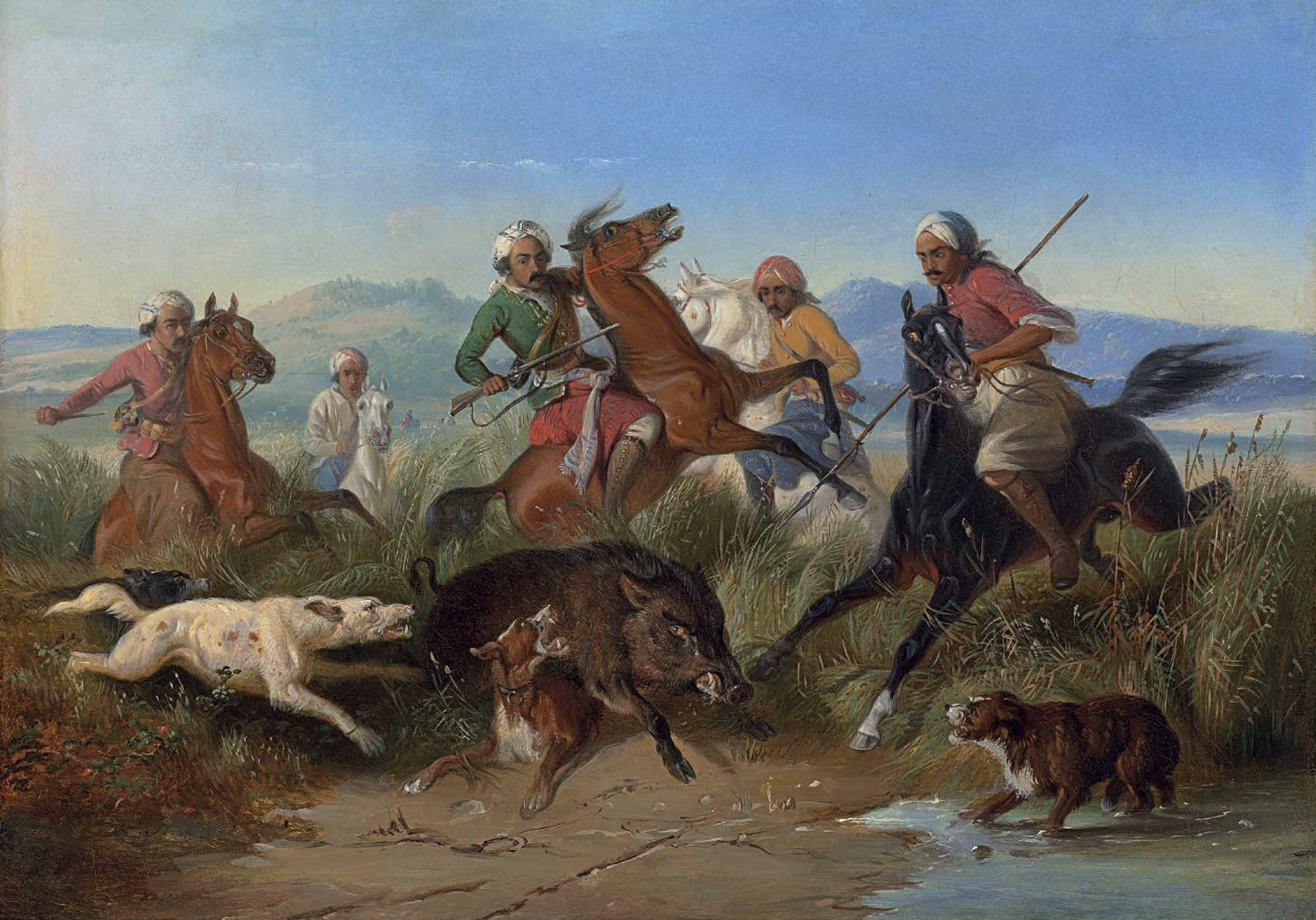
Raden Saleh's romantic depiction of boar hunting

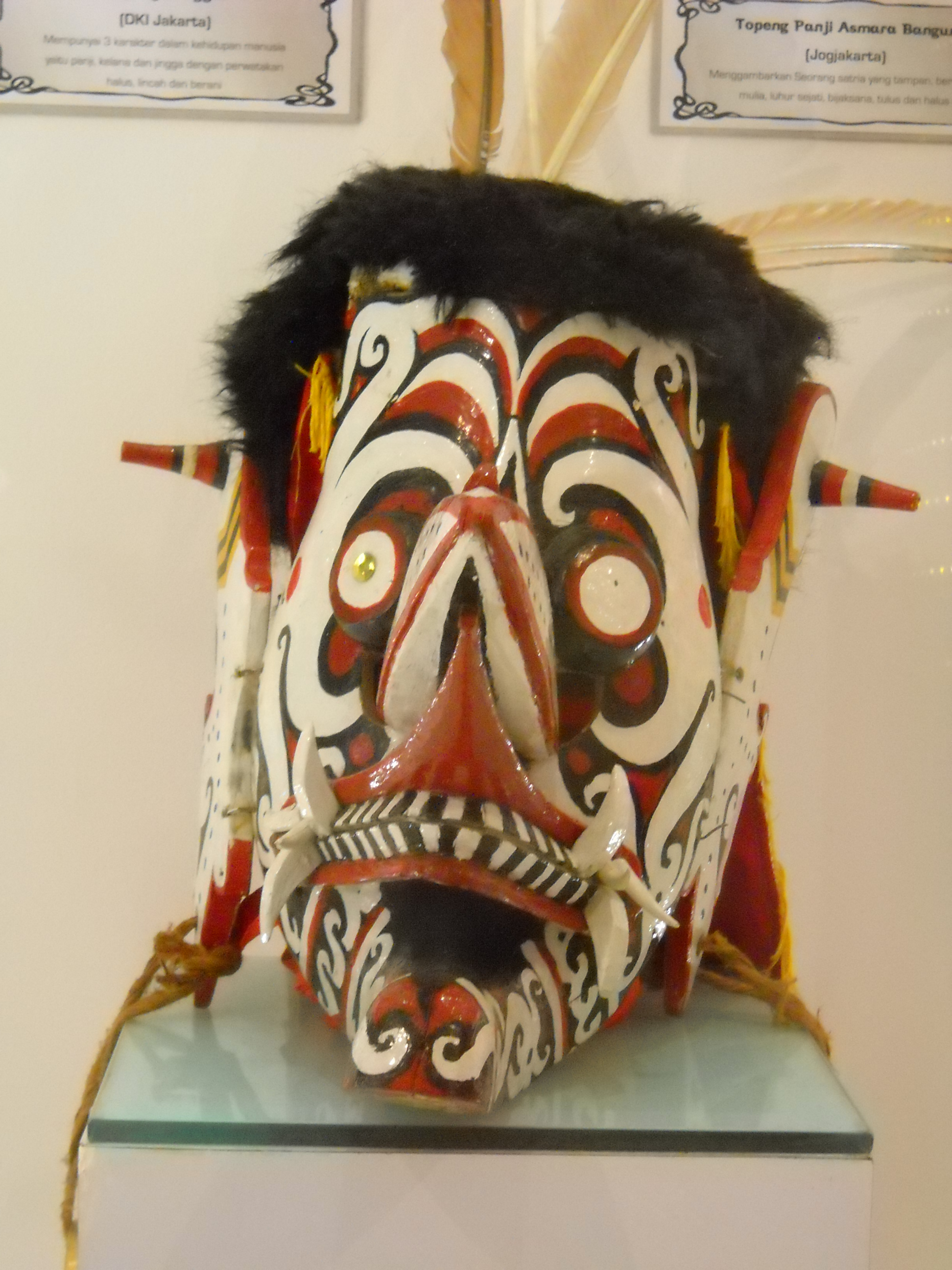
Hudoq Mask of the Dayak People

== See also ==
- Culture of Indonesia
