= Willem van der Does =

Dutch painter (1889–1966)

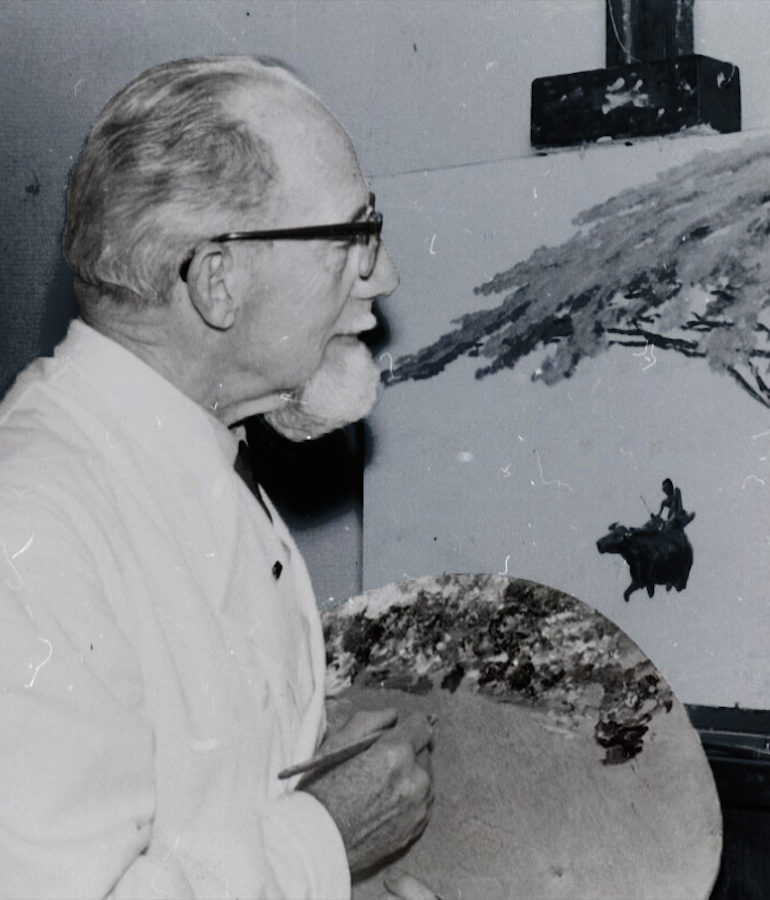
- Born: Willem Jan Pieter van der Does; 20 April 1889; Rotterdam, Netherlands
- Died: 3 February 1966 (aged 76); Zeist, Netherlands
- Education: Rotterdam Academy of Art
- Known for: Painting, illustration
- Movement: East Indies impressionist

Willem Jan Pieter van der Does (20 April 1889 – 3 February 1966) was a Dutch painter, art illustrator, draftsman, and water-colorist associated with the East Indies impressionist movement.

== Biography ==
Willem van der Does was born on 20 April 1889 in Rotterdam, Netherlands. He was the son of an expat (probably a sea commander) working in the Dutch East Indies. Since his childhood, he had always been taught to become an artist by his family, in his youthful years he studied in de Rotterdam Academie van Kunst (now the Willem de Kooning Academy) and then continued his study privately. He came to the Dutch East Indies around the year c.1918, and growing up there until he became a civil servant to survey the country. In this function he traveled all over the archipelago such as Surabaya, Batavia, Medan, Malang and Bandung.

He participated in several group and solo exhibition in the Netherlands and Indonesia. He was also the first ever known Dutchmen to have traveled to Antarctica. During his travel to Antarctica in 1923–1924, he made around 144 sketches for his book Storm, Ijs, en Walvisschen which describes his expedition and journey in exploring Antarctica.

In 1936 van der Does participated in the 1936 Olympics event in Berlin. In this event he submitted a painting that he had created in the Dutch Indies titled "Towards the Unknown" (the subject are two explorers struggling against an Antarctic storm), the painting was exhibited in the Kaiserdamm hall, along with other submitted paintings. He received a bronze participation medal from the Olympics Committee.

Van der Does was also a teacher. One of his students was the Indonesian painter Koempoel Sujatno (1912–1987). Van der Does collaborated with the impressionist painter Gerard Pieter Adolfs in the East Indies. Together, the pair created one of the first impressionist movements in East Indies (who brought and applied the Amsterdam impressionist movement). Works by the two sometimes have technical similarities.

Van der Does's works once had been presented to King Leopold III of Belgium and Queen Astrid of Sweden, and on the occasion of Queen Wilhelmina of the Netherlands's 50th birthday, the government of the Dutch East Indies presented her with a work by him. Many of his works had also been given to various government officials and other important people. These are the reasons why van der Does was often called by the East Indies government "the royal painter from the Indies".

Van der Does's illustrations were widely used throughout the 1930s in Java and in 1950s in Holland. They illustrated some of the most important printed books, that are usually a series of a translated and research book. An example is the Dutch translation of Richard Henry Dana Jr.'s 1840 work Two Years Before the Mast. This book was translated into Dutch by the Holland-America Line ship's commodore, Captain Pieter Verhoog, a close friend of van der Does. (Note: According to the widow of Captain Verhoog and Mr. Van der Elst (a good friend of the widow), Verhoog and van der Does shared the same interest and love in traveling.) Van der Does was also a newspaper illustrator and editor in the East Indies and after he went back to the Netherlands he did many journalistic works for the local newspaper.

Van der Does went back to the Netherlands in 1946. His return was caused by the early Indonesian revolution era, when many foreign people were forced to leave the country. He continued his career as a painter in Holland, and often depicted daily life in the East Indies through his memory and sketches. In Holland he often painted scenes depicting Surabaya and Malang. He stayed in Schiedam; and in 1957, he and his family moved to his retirement house in Zeist. He died on 3 February 1966 in Zeist, Netherlands.

Van der Does told a Dutch journalist who interviewed him in his retirement apartment in Zeist the main reason why he would not go back to the East Indies. In a subtle and saddened old man voice he said,

If I close my eyes and think about the Indies, I always taught that it is the Indies I will never go back to, and can never go back, because the Indies that I know no longer exists.

Van der Does's legacy is as a patronage for the East Indies impressionist movement. His works have been collected by Kings and Queens, and also by many other named collectors, museums, institutes, and galleries around the world including countries like the Netherlands, Indonesia, United States, Singapore, Germany, United Kingdom, France, Austria, Malaysia, and Hong Kong.

== Select works ==
=== Zeilen Door De Grote Storm ===
Zeilen Door De Grote Storm (English: "Sailing Through the Great Storm") is a 1920s seascape painting by van der Does. It is signed in the lower right corner, and measures around 15 x 26.8 in. Painted with an impressionistic style, this painting shows a very detailed and abstract impressionistic brushwork. This painting was exhibited in the 1920s exhibition of East Indies impressionist movement, in the G. Kolff & Company (largest books manufacturer in colonial East Indies at that time), in Weltevreden, Batavia.

This is the only known (in 2020) surviving black and white painting done by van der Does. All others known were lost to the fire that took place in an exhibition hall in Schiedam.

== Exhibitions ==
- Bandung, Vereenigingslokaal, October 1918
- Batavia, Boekhandel Visser, August 1930
- Batavia, Fa. F. van Eelde, December 1934
- Berlin, 1936 Summer Olympics, Kaiserdamm exhibition area hall VI 1936
- Batavia, Hotel des Indies, September 1938

== Public collections ==
- Nederlands Scheepvaartmuseum
- Tropenmuseum
- Maritime Museum Rotterdam
- Yale-NUS College

== Reception of Storms, Ice, and Whales ==
Van der Does is without doubt a fine author. I sat on the edge of my chair while reading his translated book in manuscript form. It really made me wonder whether I was reading a ship's journal, a tantalising autobiographical novel, or -if at all possible- a combination of the two!

— Joost C. A. Schokkenbroek (curator of Nederlands Scheepvaartmuseum & New Bedford Whaling Museum)

Willem van der Does's story of storm, ice, and whales lures readers to want more while also warning them to stay safely at home. The leviathan lives, we discover, and we thankfully grip our remove from the cold and the danger as we excitedly read on.

— William F. Buckley Jr.

== Art market ==
- On 24 January 2015, an oil painting by van der Does titled "Women Carrying the Goods" was sold for S$19,520.

- On 14 July 2013, an oil painting by van der Does titled "Kalimas, Surabaya" was sold for S$12,200.
