= Ludruk =

Indonesian folk theatre in East Java

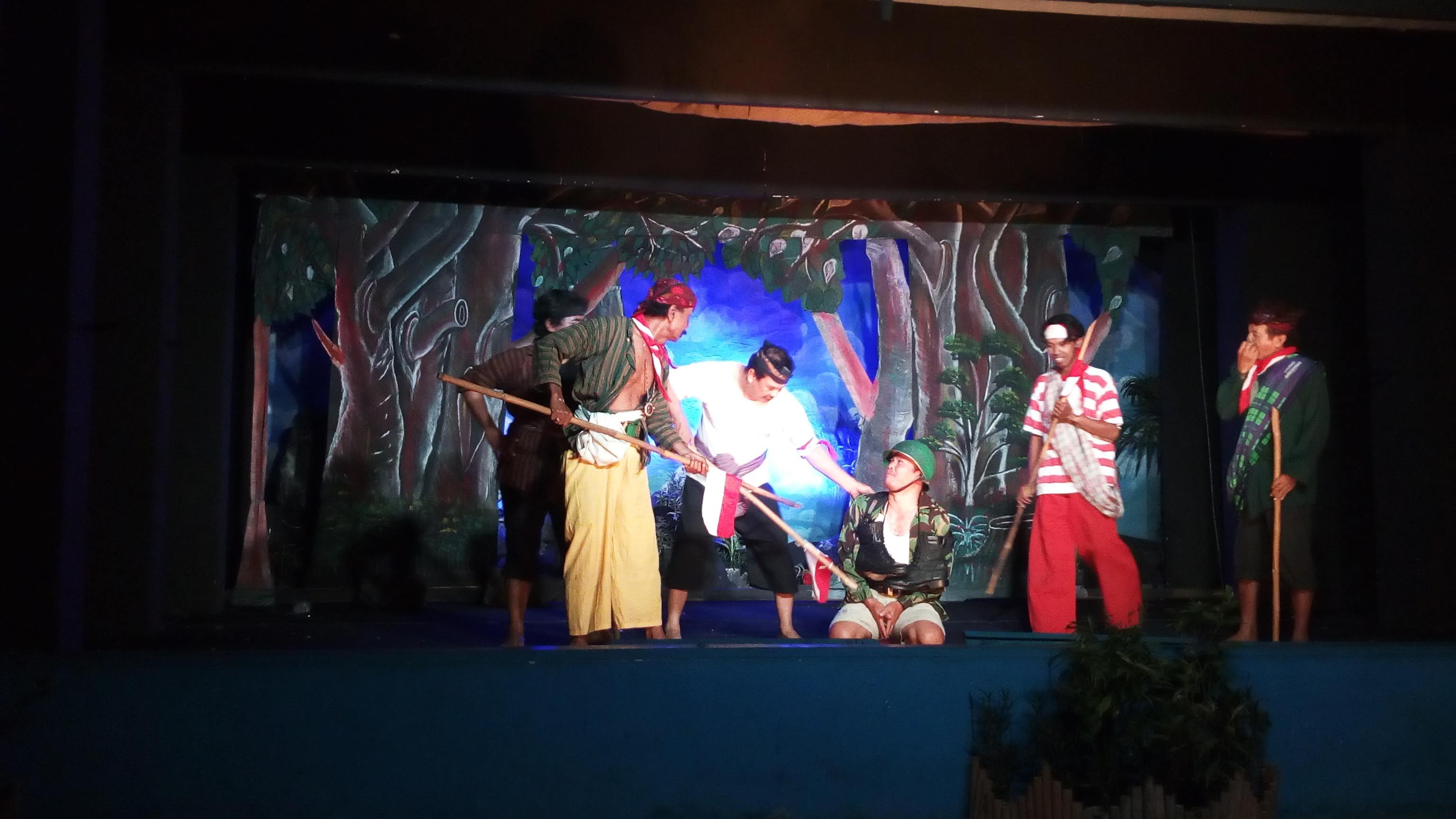
- Ludruk performance
- Types: Theatre
- Originating culture: Indonesia

Ludruk is one of the theatrical genres in East Java. It is a form of traditional performance presented by a troupe of actors (or comedians) on a stage, re-telling the life stories of everyday people and their struggles. Its origin is unclear, but it is believed to be dated as far back as the 13th century.

The dialogue or monologue in ludruk is mostly comedic. The actors would almost always use the Surabaya dialect of Javanese language, although sometimes there can be occasional guest stars from other areas, such as Jombang, Malang, Madura, and Madiun, each of whom would use their own dialect. Despite the fact that many different dialects are employed in one performance, as a whole, ludruk is a simple and straightforward comedy, making ludruk easily understood by everyone. It is occasionally interspersed with jokes and accompanied by gamelan to form a musical performance.

A typical ludruk performance begins with a performance of Remo dance and followed by a portrayal Pak Sakera, a legendary 19th century Madurese hero.

Ludruk differs from ketoprak from Central Java, in that the plot in ketoprak is often drawn from Javanese history and legends. Both genres focus on delivering a particular moral message, but ludruk tells stories about everyday life, and mostly that of the underprivileged. It is a popular form of entertainment for the working-class audience.

== See also ==
- Ketoprak
- Wayang
