= Ketoprak =

Indonesian performing art

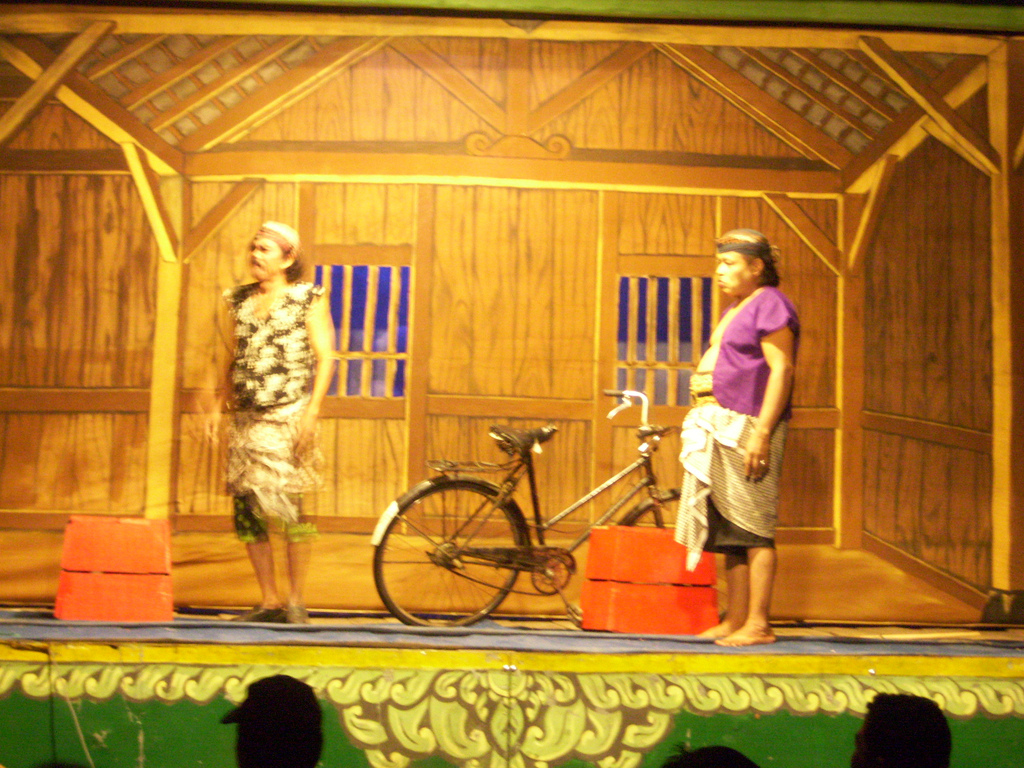
- Ketoprak performance
- Types: Traditional theatre
- Ancestor arts: Javanese
- Originating culture: Indonesia

Ketoprak (Javanese: ꧋ꦏꦺꦛꦺꦴꦥꦿꦏ꧀, romanized: Kethoprak) is a theatrical genre of Java featuring actors who may also sing to the accompaniment of the gamelan. It draws its stories from Javanese history and romances and in this differs from wayang wong, which shares with wayang kulit a repertoire drawn from the Hindu epics Mahabharata and Ramayana, as well as from ludruk which uses contemporary settings and the three-walled srimulat, which specializes in vampire stories. According to Clifford Geertz it was invented as recently as 1923.

Ketoprak troupes might own or rent a performance building, such as Ketoprak Srimulat that used to be performed in a theatre both in Jakarta and Surabaya back in the 1980s, or troupes might travel through villages. The travelling ketoprak troupe is called Kethoprak Tobong, also known as Ketoprak Tonil. It might be considered as common people theatrical tradition in Java. The show were performed in certain period in an empty plain near a village and moved from one place to another, in fashion similar to western travelling circus. In this traveling troupe, the performers and staffs also brought show properties; such as costumes, stage decorations, chairs, gamelan, sound system, diesel electric generator, all were contained in a portable building that also used as set or stage called "tobong". During their journey, the troupe members also living in this tobong.

Recently ketoprak has been adopted into television show, the "Ketoprak Humor" show was aired in Indonesian national television. It is a comedy and action performance, often took place in modern settings or in historical ancient Javanese kingdoms. The ketoprak that took the story of ancient Java is quite similar to Wayang wong performance, however ketoprak performance is more free for improvisations, jokes and adoption of popular languages, while Wayang wong are traditionally highly stylized with precise and structurized dance drama discipline.

== See also ==
- Ludruk
- Wayang wong
