= Si Tjonat =

1929 film by Nelson Wong

- Directed by: Nelson Wong
- Based on: Tjerita Si Tjonat by F.D.J. Pangemanann
- Produced by: Nelson Wong; Jo Eng Sek
- Starring: Ku Fung May; Herman Sim
- Production company: Batavia Motion Picture
- Release date: 1929 (Dutch East Indies)
- Country: Dutch East Indies
- Language: Silent

Si Tjonat (Perfected Spelling: Si Conat) is a likely lost 1929 bandit film from the Dutch East Indies (now Indonesia) directed by Nelson Wong and produced by Wong and Jo Eng Sek. Based on the novel by F.D.J. Pangemanann, the silent film followed an indigenous man who, having killed his fellow villager, flees to Batavia (today Jakarta) and becomes a bandit. After kidnapping an ethnic Chinese woman, he is defeated and brought to justice.

A commercially oriented work aimed at ethnic Chinese audiences, Si Tjonat received mixed reviews; box office proceeds are unclear. Although intended as a serial, no sequel was ever made; the production house, Batavia Motion Picture, closed soon afterwards. Several works in the same genre were released soon afterwards, including Si Pitoeng, which used the same director and star.

== Plot ==
Tjonat, a Sundanese youth, kills his friend and escapes to Batavia (now Jakarta), the capital of the Dutch East Indies, where he finds work with a Dutch man. Tjonat soon robs the man of his wealth and seduces his mistress (njai), then leaves the household to live the life of a bandit. When he asks Lie Gouw Nio (Ku Fung May), the daughter of a peranakan Chinese farmer named Lie A Tjip, to be his lover, she refuses. Enraged, Tjonat kidnaps her, but Lie is rescued by her fiancé, Thio Sing Sang (Herman Sim), who is well-trained in martial arts.

== Production ==
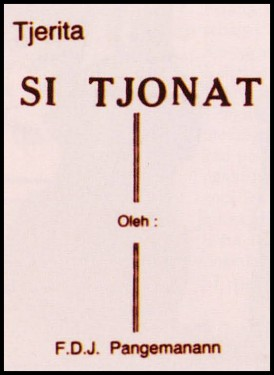
Si Tjonat was based on Tjerita Si Tjonat (1900).

Si Tjonat was directed by Nelson Wong, who produced the film in conjunction with his business partner Jo Eng Sek. The two had established Batavia Motion Picture in 1929. Wong had previously directed a single fiction film, the commercial flop Lily van Java (1928), with funding from a high-ranking General Motors employee in Batavia named David Wong. (Note: No relation) Jo Eng Sek, a shop owner, had never produced a film.

The story for Si Tjonat was based on the novel Tjerita Si Tjonat, written by reporter F.D.J. Pangemanann and first published in 1900. The story had proved popular with ethnic Chinese readers. It was often adapted to the stage by Betawi stage troupes as a lenong stage performance. (Note: It remained popular until after Indonesia's independence in 1945 (Toer 1982, pp. 28–29).) The story was selected by Jo Eng Sek. Several changes were introduced to the story. For instance, in the novel Lie A Tjip was a poor farmer, whereas in the film he was wealthy. Lie Gouw Nio, meanwhile, was not depicted as a poor Chinese woman, but the "a modern girl, dressed in a skirt, shoes, socks, and bobbed hair". (Note: Original: "... gadis modern jang berpakean rok, spatoe, kous, dan ramboet di-bob.")

The silent film was shot in black-and-white and starred Ku Fung May and Herman Sim. Sim, of peranakan Chinese descent, had previously acted in Shanghai, while Ku Fung May had no film experience. The martial arts sequences used in the film were inspired by Hollywood Westerns, then popular in the Indies.

== Release and reception ==
Si Tjonat was released in 1929. Although a work of fiction, it was advertised as based on a true story; this had been common in works of Malay literature at the turn of the 20th century, including Tjerita Si Tjonat. The film was one in a line of domestic productions targeted primarily at ethnic Chinese audiences, following Lily van Java and Setangan Berloemoer Darah (both 1928); film historian Misbach Yusa Biran writes that this was evident from the predominantly Chinese production team and cast. (Note: The Chinese and native ethnic groups were divided both legally and culturally. The Dutch colonial government enacted legislation which stratified the Indies population at three levels, with the Chinese as middlemen between the higher-class Dutch and lower-class natives. Culturally, peranakan Chinese tended to orient themselves with mainland China and not the various native cultures, such as the Sundanese or Javanese. Although the Chinese were a small minority in the Indies, they maintained a higher standard of living than natives (Sukma 1999, pp. 171–172).) Native audiences also enjoyed the film, particularly its action sequences. Indonesian film critic Salim Said writes that it was of distinctly commercial orientation, meant only to turn a profit.

Sales figures are unclear. Said writes that it was a commercial success, while Biran – noting that Batavia Motion Picture was dissolved not long after Si Tjonat's release – suggests that returns were poor. Reviews were mixed. In general the press criticised the emphasis on murder and crime, while in Panorama magazine, Kwee Tek Hoay wrote that the film had been "fairly well produced", (Note: Original: "... atoerannja loemajan djoega".) emphasising Sim's acting – particularly his martial arts skills. Kwee concluded that what few mistakes were found in the film were, ultimately, insignificant.

Although Si Tjonat was initially intended to be a serial, production of the second instalment halted after the closure of Batavia Motion Picture. Jo Eng Sek left the industry completely, only returning in 1935 to produce Poei Sie Giok Pa Loei Tay. Wong, meanwhile, remained active in the cinema together with his brothers Joshua and Othniel. Using the banner Halimoen Film they later cast Sim in their 1931 film Si Pitoeng. Ku Fung May did not act in another film. Several films centred on bandits, including Lie Tek Swie's Si Ronda (1930) and the Wongs' Rampok Preanger (1929) and Si Pitoeng (1931), followed soon after Si Tjonat.

Si Tjonat is likely a lost film. The American visual anthropologist Karl G. Heider writes that all Indonesian films from before 1950 are lost. However, J.B. Kristanto's Katalog Film Indonesia (Indonesian Film Catalogue) records several as having survived at Sinematek Indonesia's archives, and Biran writes that several Japanese propaganda films have survived at the Netherlands Government Information Service.

== Works cited ==
- Biran, Misbach Yusa (2009). Sejarah Film 1900–1950: Bikin Film di Jawa [History of Film 1900–1950: Making Films in Java] (in Indonesian). Jakarta: Komunitas Bamboo working with the Jakarta Art Council. ISBN 978-979-3731-58-2.
- Heider, Karl G (1991). Indonesian Cinema: National Culture on Screen. Honolulu: University of Hawaii Press. ISBN 978-0-8248-1367-3.
- "Ku Fung May". filmindonesia.or.id. Jakarta: Konfiden Foundation. Archived from the original on 7 March 2016.
- Kwee, Tek Hoay (20 May 1930). "Film Si Tjonat: Kaloearan Pertama dari Batavia Motion Picture Company" [The Film Si Tjonat: The First Production of Batavia Motion Picture Company]. Panorama (in Malay). 4 (173): 9–11. (accessed as a clipping at Sinematek Indonesia)
- Said, Salim (1982). Profil Dunia Film Indonesia [Profile of Indonesian Cinema] (in Indonesian). Jakarta: Grafiti Pers. OCLC 9507803.
- Sen, Kreshna (2006). "'Chinese' Indonesians in National Cinema". In Sun, Wanning (ed.). Media and the Chinese Diaspora. New York: Routledge. pp. 119–136. ISBN 978-1-134-26359-2.
- "Si Tjonat". filmindonesia.or.id. Jakarta: Konfiden Foundation. Archived from the original on 2 December 2013.
- Sukma, Rizal (1999). Indonesia and China: The Politics of a Troubled Relationship. New York: Routledge. ISBN 978-0-203-16535-5.
- Toer, Pramoedya Ananta, ed. (1982). Tempo Doeloe: Antologi Sastra Pra-Indonesia [Earlier Times: Anthology of Pre-Indonesian Literature] (in Indonesian). Jakarta: Hasta Mitra. OCLC 9797224.
