= Tjerita Si Tjonat =

1900 novel by F.D.J. Pangemanann

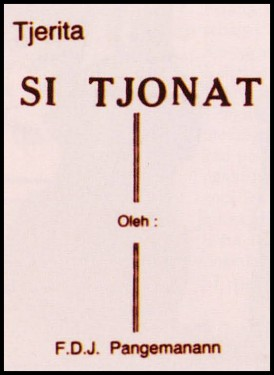
- Cover, first edition
- Author: F.D.J. Pangemanann
- Language: Vernacular Malay
- Genre: Bandit
- Publisher: Tjoe Toei Yang
- Publication place: Dutch East Indies
- Pages: 126
- OCLC: 35197577

Tjěrita Si Tjonat, Sato Kěpala Pěnjamoen di Djaman Dahoeloe Kala (Note: Malay for The Story of Si Tjonat, a Bandit Leader from Olden Times; Perfected spelling: Cerita Si Conat, Satu Kepala Penyamun di Jaman Dahulu Kala; another subtitle is Satoe Kapala Pěnjamoen di Djaman Dahoeloe Tempo Tahon 1840. Jang Bětoel Soeda Kědjadian di Batavia, meaning A Bandit Leader in the Olden Days of 1840. True Events which Happened in Batavia.) (also known as Tjěrita Si Tjonat; Perfected Spelling Cerita Si Tjonat) is a 1900 novel written by the journalist F. D. J. Pangemanann. One of numerous bandit stories from the contemporary Indies, it follows the rise and fall of Tjonat, from his first murder at the age of thirteen until his execution some twenty-five years later. The novel's style, according to Malaysian scholar Abdul Wahab Ali, is indicative of a transitional period between orality and written literature. Tjerita Si Tjonat has been adapted to the stage multiple times, and in 1929 a film version was made.

== Plot ==
Thirteen-year-old Tjonat, the spoiled son of a village chief, is chased out of his hometown after he is caught stealing his father's expensive batik shirt. Having no money and only a single torn pair of pants, Tjonat kills an 8-year-old boy to steal his buffalo. With the help of his elder mentor, Gondit, Tjonat sells the buffalo at a distant market. However, Gondit is unwilling to give Tjonat his share of the money until they reach Batavia (now Jakarta). Suspicious, Tjonat prepares a sharpened bamboo tip. When Gondit tries to kill him, Tjonat stabs him in the stomach with the bamboo and steals all of his money. He then goes to Batavia on his own.

Ten years have passed, and Tjonat has worked a variety of jobs under various names. However, he was often fired for stealing. Now he serves as a manservant for a rich Dutchman named Opmeijer. Using his charms, Tjonat woos Opmeijer's njai (concubine), Saipa, and convinces her to elope with him and take their master's possessions. The two make their way to Saipa's hometown and marry. However, theirs is an unhappy relationship and, after several years, Tjonat stops supporting his wife and returning home, instead choosing to spend his time as a robber. After asking for a divorce, Saipa prepares to marry a fellow villager. However, in a fit of rage Tjonat returns to their home and kills Saipa.

Tjonat, by now the leader of a gang of bandits, turns his attention to Lie Gouw Nio, the daughter of a peranakan Chinese farmer. However, Gouw Nio is already betrothed to Tio Sing Sang. After an attempt to furtively kidnap her fails, Tjonat and his gang launch an assault on the Lies' farmstead. The family is able to escape, and Lie Gouw Nio is sent to Batavia to stay with her future in-laws. In an attempt to eliminate the competition, several weeks later Tjonat and his gang invade Tio Sing Sang's home, killing his grandfather Keng Bo and injuring the youth.

After recovering, Sing Sang begins training in the use of weapons and prepares to fight Tjonat. Meanwhile, Tjonat has become aware of Gouw Nio's presence in Batavia. When Gouw Nio and Sing Sang's parents leave the city to attend Keng Bo's funeral, Tjonat ensures that his men are hired as bodyguards. Outside of Tangerang Tjonat makes his move, kidnapping Gouw Nio and allowing the Tios to escape.

Upon hearing of his fiancée's peril, Sing Sang follows Tjonat and finds him in a cave. Although capable of ambushing the bandit, he refuses to kill in cold blood. Instead, Sing Sang attacks an armed Tjonat with his bare hands and wins, using Tjonat's own knife to cut the bandit's ears off and mark his forehead with a "T" before ordering him to return Gouw Nio. Tjonat, however, does not obey, instead stabbing Gouw Nio in the chest and throwing her in a nearby river. At that moment Tjonat is arrested by arriving police and villagers, while Sing Sang rescues Gouw Nio from the current.

After a long recovery, Gouw Nio and Sing Sang are married. Tjonat and his men are executed.

== Writing ==
Tjerita Si Tjonat was written by F.D.J. Pangemanann, a journalist. It was his first novel. A second, Tjerita Rossina (Story of Rossina), likewise centred on the adventures of a bandit, followed in 1903 after being serialised.

Tjonat was part of Batavia's oral tradition at the time, and was believed to have been historical. Stories of bandits such as Tjonat were common at the time. Others included Si Pitung, Si Ronda and Si Jampang.

== Themes and style ==
James T. Siegel notes that the arrival of the police at the novel's climax is, like in G. Francis' Njai Dasima, a "natural culmination" to the events, with the police protecting the innocent and punishing the guilty. He contrasts this with a discussion written by Tirto Adhi Soerjo regarding the cultural roles in the Indies, in which individuals had to wear clothing in accordance to their ethnic identity, for which failure to abide meant punishment at the hands of police. C. W. Watson notes that, as common for romantic adventure stories, "the bandit never succeeds in his attempted rape, but is prevented in the nick of time by the prompt intervention of the hero".

The book's plot is not presented chronologically, instead using flashbacks covering the events between one key plot point and another to build suspense. The story elements all focus on different events in Tjonat's life, sometimes with heavy repetition. Abdul Wahab Ali considers the plot forced in places, and notes that the individual episodes in Tjonat's life are self-contained, with a clear beginning and end. The plot spans over twenty-five years, from Tjonat's exile from his village in 1830 to his execution on 5 April 1855. Wahab Ali writes that the novel's characterisation is flat, with characters introduced in quick succession and not developed further. Tjonat, he opines, is likewise one-dimensional: evil from the beginning, without a single redeeming feature. However, since Indonesia's national revolution he has been portrayed more as a heroic rebel and people's champion.

The novel is written in vernacular Malay, a creole used throughout the Indies for trade. Pangemanann writes fluently, but not in a literary manner. Wahab Ali suggests that terminology in the novel, including various appeals to the reader and author, indicate a transition from orality to written literature. He notes several techniques, including the aforementioned flashbacks, which are new to the contemporary written Indies literature.

== Release and reception ==
Tjerita Si Tjonat was published in 1900 by the Batavia-based Tjoe Toei Yang. It was advertised as a true story, something which has been debated. The story proved popular with ethnic Chinese readers. In 1982 Tjerita Si Tjonat was one of seven novels (also including Tjerita Rossina) anthologised in Tempo Doeloe by the novelist Pramoedya Ananta Toer.

Soon after publication the story was adapted for lenong (a traditional Betawi form of theatre), and remained popular until after Indonesia's independence in 1945. It was also performed in other traditional theatrical forms. In 1929 Nelson Wong and Jo Eng Sek adapted the story for film. Initially intended as a serial, this version – entitled Si Tjonat – starred Ku Fung May as Gouw Nio and Herman Sim as Sing Sang.
