= Balaksuji =

Staircase in front of Rumah Panggung Betawi

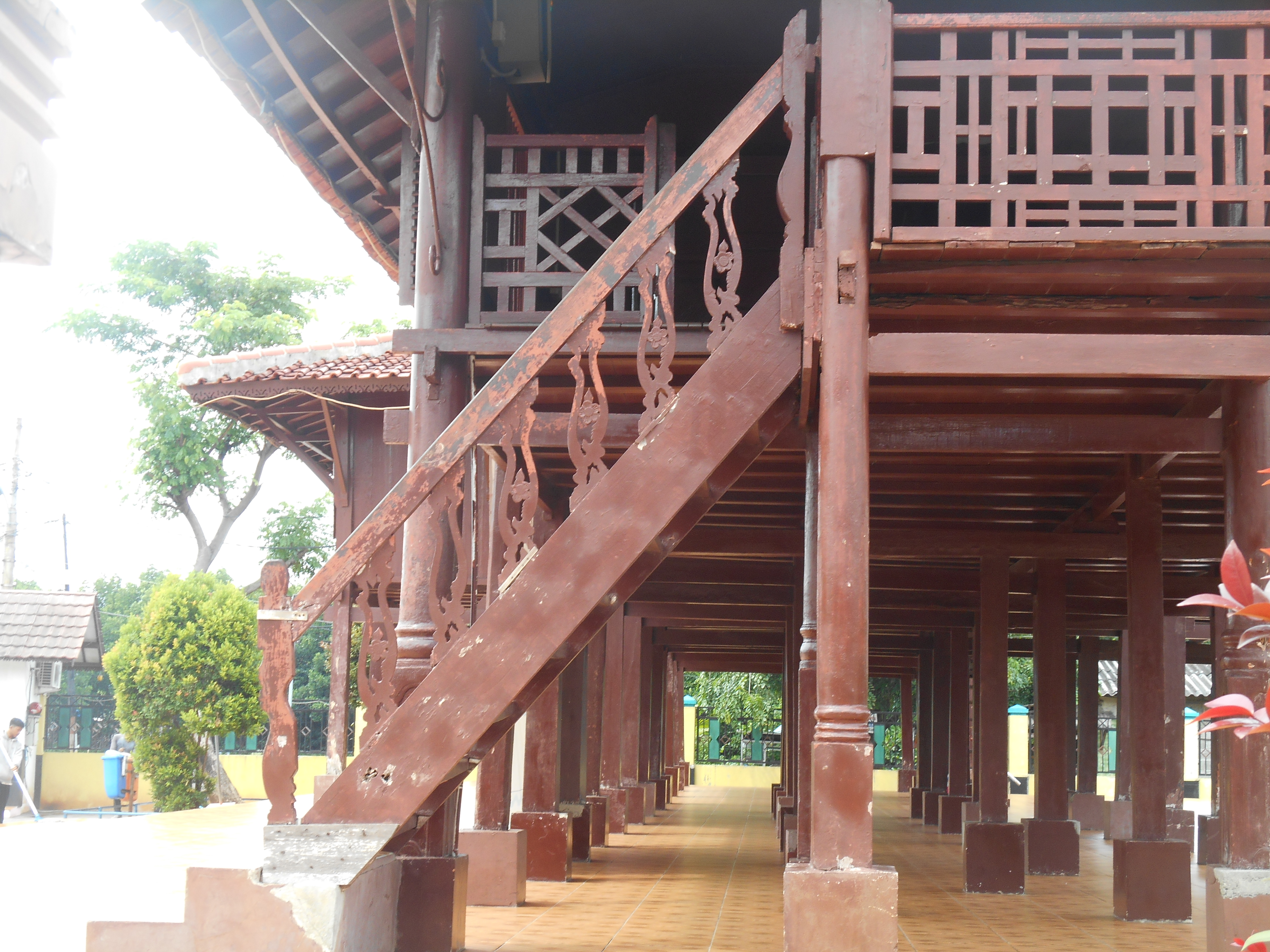
Balaksuji at Pitung's House in Marunda, Jakarta.

Balaksuji is the staircase in front of a Rumah Panggung Betawi type house. Among the Sundanese people, this kind of ladder is nicknamed "golodog".

In Betawi culture, balaksuji is considered to have a philosophical element. Balaksuji is believed to be a means to ward off disaster. In addition, before entering the house through balaksuji, Betawi people must first purify themselves by washing their feet. The purpose is so that the owner is already in a "holy" and "clean" state when he enters the house. Balaksuji itself is a figure of speech that means "cooling area".

Nowadays, balaksuji is no longer built in modern Betawi houses because it is considered troublesome. However, "balaksuji" can still be found in many mosques built in Betawi architectural style.

== Bibliography ==
- Swadarma, Doni; Aryanto, Yunus (2014). Rumah Etnik Betawi. Jakarta: Griya Kreasi. ISBN 978-979-661-212-3.
- Wijayanti, Gresceila; Chintya, Resya; Nurhasanah (2019). "Penerapan Balaksuji dan Langkan pada Rumah Tradisional Betawi di Kampung Betawi, Jakarta Selatan". Mezanin. 1 (1). Universitas Tarumanagara Fakultas Seni Rupa Dan Desain.
