= Palang pintu =

Betawi wedding tradition

A palang pintu (literally gate barrier) is a ceremony that forms part of a traditional wedding among the Betawi people. It incorporates elements of martial arts and the composition of pantun poetry. In this tradition, local martial arts champions (Basa betawi: Jawara), who act as representatives of either the bride or groom, show their ability to execute silat moves and recite pantun passages at one another. Once the champions have fought and exchanged pantun, a reading from the Quran usually takes place, after which the groom and his entourage may enter into the bride's house to continue the wedding ceremony.

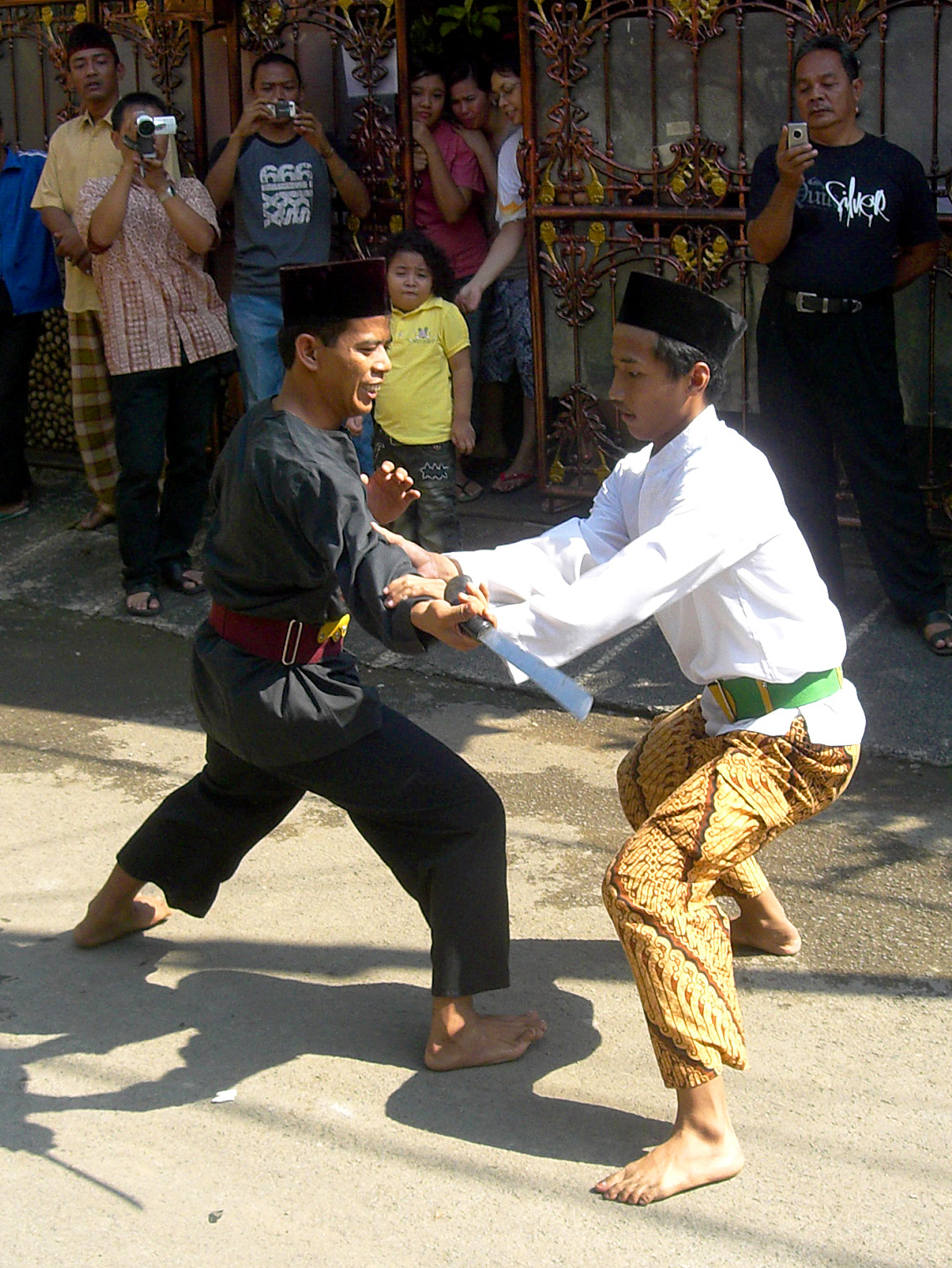
Betawi-style pencak silat, performed during a palang pintu ceremony.

The palang pintu ceremony is a symbolic test that the groom must pass in order to win the favour of the bride's entourage. The silat duel represents the groom's ability to protect his family from danger, while the exchange of pantun demonstrates his capacity for diplomacy. The champion from the groom's local area must defeat the champion from the bride's area; this is important for the process of the wedding, in which the groom's entourage must pass through the obstacle arranged by the bride's party. A palang pintu ceremony may also function as a reconciliation of interfamilial and inter-kampung relations.

Palang pintu may occur outside of weddings to welcome visitors or as part of official inaugurations. In 2025, incoming Governor of Jakarta Pramono Anung and Deputy Governor Rano Karno were received with a palang pintu ceremony outside Jakarta City Hall.
