= Forum Komunikasi Anak Betawi =

Social organization for Betawi people in Jakarta

Forum Komunikasi Anak Betawi Communication Forum for Betawi People
- Abbreviation: Forkabi
- Formation: 18 April 2001; 25 years ago
- Type: Socio-political organization Ethnic organization
- Region served: Jakarta metropolitan area
- Members: 500,000 (2021)
- Official language: Betawi, Indonesian
- Leader: Abdul Ghoni

Forum Komunikasi Anak Betawi (lit. 'Communication Forum for Betawi People'), also known as Forkabi, is a mass organization (ormas) of Betawi people based in the Jakarta metropolitan area (Jabodetabek). Founded in 2001, Forkabi has operated as a social organization of lower-class Betawi people who work in the informal sector, notably parking lot inspection. Forkabi also acted as a channel for the Betawi people's political aspirations. Today, Forkabi holds more than 500,000 members across the Jabodetabek region and especially active in East Jakarta, as well as the border between South Jakarta and Depok.

== History ==
Forkabi was founded on 18 April 2001, by a group of Betawi people, namely Husen Tsani, General Sanif, Colonel Asmuni, H. Abdul Khoir, and Irwan Syafi'i. The establishment of Forkabi reflected growing anxiety among the Betawi people for being relegated to a minority within their native land of Jakarta, due to the ever-increasing number of migrants from other parts of the Indonesian archipelago. In 2001, there was a particularly intense rivalry between the Betawi people and the migrant Madurese people, which heightened a sense of solidarity among the Betawi community.

Four goals were put in place for Forkabi to be able to uplift the Betawi community:

- Become an actor in their own homeland
- Be proud of being a Betawi person
- Be respected and loved by the people of the same nation, being able to embrace people from non-Betawi land to make them feel inseparable from the Betawi community
- Make the culture and nuances of the Betawi people in their own homeland admired and appreciated by the Indonesian as well as the international community

On 25 February 2021, a Great Indonesia Movement Party (Gerindra) politician Abdul Ghoni who is the head of Gerindra faction in the Jakarta Regional People's Representative Council has been elected as the leader of Forkabi for the period of 2021–2026. Under the leadership of Ghoni, Forkabi aims to expand its cooperatives which provide loans toward the Micro, Small, and Medium Enterprises (MSME).

== Organization ==
Forkabi's directorship is composed of the Governing Body on Daily Affairs, Advisory Board, and the Board of Supervisors which consists of former Jakarta governors as well as police chiefs. As an organizational structure, Forkabi consists of the Central Board (DPP), Regional Board (DPD), Branch Board (DPC), Department Board (DPRT), Sub-department Board (DP Subran), Outer Region Board (DPLD), Overseas Board (DPLN). The Sub-Department Board sets up a group of neighborhood coordinators consists of 10-15 members who take care of rukun tetangga (RT) (a minimum administrative unit of Indonesian districts).

Forkabi's regular membership is limited to the Betawi people, but it also has a system of honorary membership which is open to non-Betawi people who lived for more than 10 years in Jakarta and brought positive contributions to the Betawi community and willing to shoulder the responsibility of protecting the image of the Betawi people.

== Socio-political activities ==
Forkabi frequently engages in turf war with other mass organizations operating in the Jabodetabek area, chiefly the fellow Betawi organization Forum Betawi Rempug (FBR) and the nationalist paramilitary organization Pancasila Youth.

Since its foundation, Forkabi has actively participated in political campaigns for the Jakarta gubernatorial elections. Forkabi cultivated a strong patron-client relations with certain candidates and rallied for Fauzi Bowo (a Betawi politician) in 2007 and 2012 and Anies Baswedan in 2017.
