= Forum Betawi Rempug =

Betawi mass organization in Indonesia

- Abbreviation: FBR
- Formation: 29 July 2001; 25 years ago
- Type: Political organization Ethnic organization
- Legal status: Active
- Headquarters: Pondok Pesantren Yatim Ziyadatul Mubtadi'en, East Jakarta
- Region served: Jakarta metropolitan area
- Members: 100,000
- Official language: Betawi; Indonesian
- Chairman: Fadloli El Munir (2001–2009); Lutfi Hakim (2009–)

The Forum Betawi Rempug (Note: Rempug means "to congregate.") (FBR) is a Betawi mass organization (ormas) based in Jakarta. The group was established on 29 July 2001, by two Betawi kyais Fadloli El Muhir and Lutfi Hakim. The FBR aims to champion the political rights of the Betawi people, an indigenous but marginalized ethnic group based in Jakarta. Today, the FBR has set up over 300 branches in the Jakarta metropolitan area (Jabodetabek) with each at least 100 active memberships.

== History ==
=== Background ===
Betawi people consider Jakarta (formerly Batavia) to be their homeland, but the establishment of the city as the capital of Indonesia after independence has led to an influx of other ethnic groups from all over the Indonesian archipelago. As such, they believe they were reduced to a minority in their native land. Members of the Betawi community have been involved in communal conflicts with other ethnic groups, which have been regarded as existential threats to their identity and culture. Post-Suharto era in Indonesia has seen a surge in the foundation of ethnic and religious organizations, and the Betawi community also founded the FBR as a response to these developments in order to strengthen their ethnic solidarity.

=== Formation ===
The FBR was founded on July 29, 2001, by two kyais, (Note: A kyai is a leader of pesantren, a traditional Islamic school in the Malay world.) Fadloli El Muhir and Lutfi Hakim at the Islamic educational and community center Pondok Pesantren Yatim Ziyadatul Mubtadi'en. The pesantren is located in East Jakarta and was founded by Fadloli himself, and served as the headquarter of the FBR and a related Islamic missionary movement. Fadloli, the first leader of the FBR, was born in Jakarta in 1961 and served as a high-ranking member of several religious organizations including Nahdlatul Ulama's student network, Majelis Muslimin Indonesia (MMI), Gerakan Santri se-Indonesia (GSI), and several study groups (majelis taklim). Before the foundation of the FBR, Fadloli was also involved in politics by supporting the 1997 campaign of Megawati Soekarnoputri's Indonesian Democratic Party of Struggle (PDI-P) in Balikpapan, East Kalimantan.

Initially, the FBR only consisted of 25 members who were acquaintances of Fadloli, with little financial support. In the beginning, the organization did not have the capacity for cadre and ideological training of its members. Since then, they have begun reaching out to the Betawi society in the Jabodetabek area, mostly focused on the lower class members of the community such as ojek (motorcycle taxi) drivers, warung sellers, parking lot inspectors (juru parkir) and the unemployed. Aimed to be a grassroots movement of economically marginalized groups, the FBR sought to equip them with collective bargaining power against the Jakartan government to improve their employment, education, and housing opportunities. Later on, the organization began to formalize its membership through the issuance of membership cards.

Shortly after the foundation, on July 15, 2002, Fadloli's car was attacked by a group of 30 people, considered to be Madurese gangsters. Although the gang members inflicted heavy damage to the kyai's car, and the alleged intention of the gang members was an assassination of Fadloli, he managed to return without serious injury. This incident has cemented the prestige of Fadloli, who has been regarded by the followers as a jawaran (champion) of the Betawi people who is divinely endowed with kebal (invulnerability) power. This incident also reminded the Betawi people of their powerlessness in their own society and urged them to answer the FBR's call for Betawi unity and protection by joining the movement.

The FBR has systematized their program which consisted of the three S's; Sholat (prayer), Silat (martial arts), and Sekolah (pesantren-based education). Newly recruited members must take an oath of allegiance (bai'yat) to the FBR and dual membership with other Betawi organizations is strictly forbidden. According to Lutfi, the FBR's organizational practice is heavily influenced by the traditional apprenticeship system of the kyai-santri which is seen in pesantren. The FBR also employs ondel-ondel on their logo and emblems as a symbol of their ethnic identity, and rejects the Islamic fundamentalism which forbids ondel-ondel on the ground of idolatry. Although the FBR is strongly influenced by traditionalist Sunni Islam, it also opens its membership toward the Betawi people of all religious backgrounds.

By 2008, the FBR claimed to have set up more than 300 branches, including 50 in Central Jakarta, 60 in East Jakarta, 32 in North Jakarta, 25 in West Jakarta, 15 in South Jakarta, and many more in the other cities of the Jabodetabek area such as Bekasi, Bogor, and Tangerang. The FBR regulates the minimum required memberships of their branch to be 100. Today, its headquarters is located in the Pondok Pesantren Yatim Ziyadatul Mubtadi'en and it maintains several other command posts across the Jabodetabek region. Over time, its members not only included Betawi people, but also several other ethnicities, such as Chinese people.

== Activities ==
=== Turf wars ===
Members of the FBR repeatedly clash with other mass organizations across the Jakarta metropolitan area mostly due to turf war which often leads to injury and arrest of their members. Notable organizations with a history of conflict with the FBR include the nationalist paramilitary organization Pancasila Youth (PP), Islamist vigilantist organization Islamic Defenders Front (FPI), West Java-based nationalist organization Gerakan Masyarakat Bawah Indonesia (Indonesian Lower Society Movement; GMBI), Bekasi-based nationalist organization Gabungan Inisiatif Barisan Anak Siliwangi (Combined Initiative of the Siliwangi Youth Front; GIBAS), other Betawi organizations such as Forum Komunikasi Anak Betawi (Communication Forum for Betawi People; Forkabi) and Ikatan Keluarga Betawi (Betawi Family Network, IKB), National Awakening Party (PKB)-affiliated Garda Bangsa, among others. On March 19, 2021, the FBR commander of South Tangerang was arrested by the local police after a clash with other groups. FBR, as a Betawi organization, also clashes with gangs of other ethnic groups such as Ambonese and Madurese immigrants.

=== Vigilantism ===
The FBR often conducts vigilantism in the name of moral policing, against bars and night clubs which are considered as vice. Some sweepings have led to violence. Compared with other vigilantist organizations such as the FPI and the Kaaba Youth Movement (GPK), the FBR takes a less strict stance on moral policing and does not order the closure of beer factories or popular cultural events such as dangdut festivals. One of the founding members, Lutfi, does not consider the FBR to have an Islamist orientation and states that the organization contributes to the protection of religious minorities including Christians and Shia Muslims. The FBR, however, denounces the Ahmadiyyah community.

The FBR also conducts patrol against street thugs and biker gangs, often in cooperation with the local police and other ormas such as the FPI. On May 26, 2017, for example, the FBR and FPI cooperated with police to prevent a turf war in Bekasi between biker gangs and dispersed hundreds of gang members who arrived by more than 50 motorcycles. The incident led to the arrest of 11 members of the Tambun 45 biker gang.

=== Political mobilization ===
The FBR carries out political mobilization on occasion, although the organization is decentralized and each chapter may have independent political inclination based on its own interest. The FBR joined the FPI in the Aksi Bela Islam (Action to Defend Islam) rally in 2016 to denounce then-Jakarta governor Basuki Tjahaja Purnama (Ahok), with whom Lutfi already had hostile relations. FBR and FPI formed the High Council for Sharia Jakarta (Majelis Tinggi Jakarta Bersyariah, MTJB) in October 2016, prior to the protest, to find and endorse a Muslim candidate in the 2017 Jakarta gubernatorial election to compete against Christian Ahok.

In March 2019, shortly before the 2019 Indonesian presidential election, Lutfi endorsed Joko Widodo-Ma'ruf Amin ticket, following the endorsement of Jokowi-Ma'ruf by the FBR chapters in West Jakarta, North Jakarta, and Bekasi. Previously, the FBR endorsed Prabowo Subianto-Hatta Rajasa in the 2014 Indonesian presidential election together with the FPI.
