= Si Jali-jali =

Betawi folk song

"Si Jali-jali" is a traditional folk song from the Betawi of Batavia (now Jakarta), Indonesia. The word Jali or Jali-jali is the Indonesian name of the tropical plant Job's Tears.

== Lyrics ==
ini dia si jali-jali

lagunya enak lagunya enak merdu sekali

capek sedikit tidak perduli sayang

asalkan tuan asalkan tuan senang di hati

palinglah enak si mangga udang

hei sayang disayang pohonnya tinggi pohonnya tinggi buahnya jarang

palinglah enak si orang bujang sayang

kemana pergi kemana pergi tiada yang m’larang

disana gunung disini gunung

hei sayang disayang ditengah tengah ditengah tengah kembang melati

disana bingung disini bingung sayang

samalah sama samalah sama menaruh hati

jalilah jali dari cikini sayang

jali-jali dari cikini jalilah jali sampai disini
