= Rumah Panggung Betawi =

Type of traditional Betawi house

Rumah Panggung is one type of traditional Betawi house where the floor is raised from the ground using wooden poles. This house type is different from a Rumah Darat type where the floor sticks to the ground. Betawi houses on stilts are built in coastal areas with the aim of dealing with floods or tides. Meanwhile, stilt houses located on the banks of rivers such as in Bekasi are not only built to avoid flooding, but also for safety from wild animals.

Betawi houses generally do not have a distinctive building form. In addition, Betawi houses also do not have standard rules in determining directions. Even so, Betawi stilt houses are still characterized in terms of details and terminology. One of them is the staircase in front of a Betawi stilt house called balaksuji. Balaksuji is believed to ward off bad luck; before entering the house through balaksuji, one must wash his feet first as a symbol of self-purification.

Materials for building Betawi stilt houses are taken from the surrounding area, such as sawo wood, jackfruit wood, bamboo, lute wood, cempaka wood, juk, and thatch. Other woods can also be used, such as teak wood to make poles. In building a house, Betawi people believe that there are various taboos and rules that need to be followed to avoid disaster. For example, the house should be built to the left of the parents' or in-laws' house. There is also a prohibition on making the roof of the house from materials that contain earth elements. The Betawi stilt house itself has been influenced by various cultures, from Javanese, Sundanese, Malay, to Chinese and Arabic, Portuguese and Dutch.

== Background ==
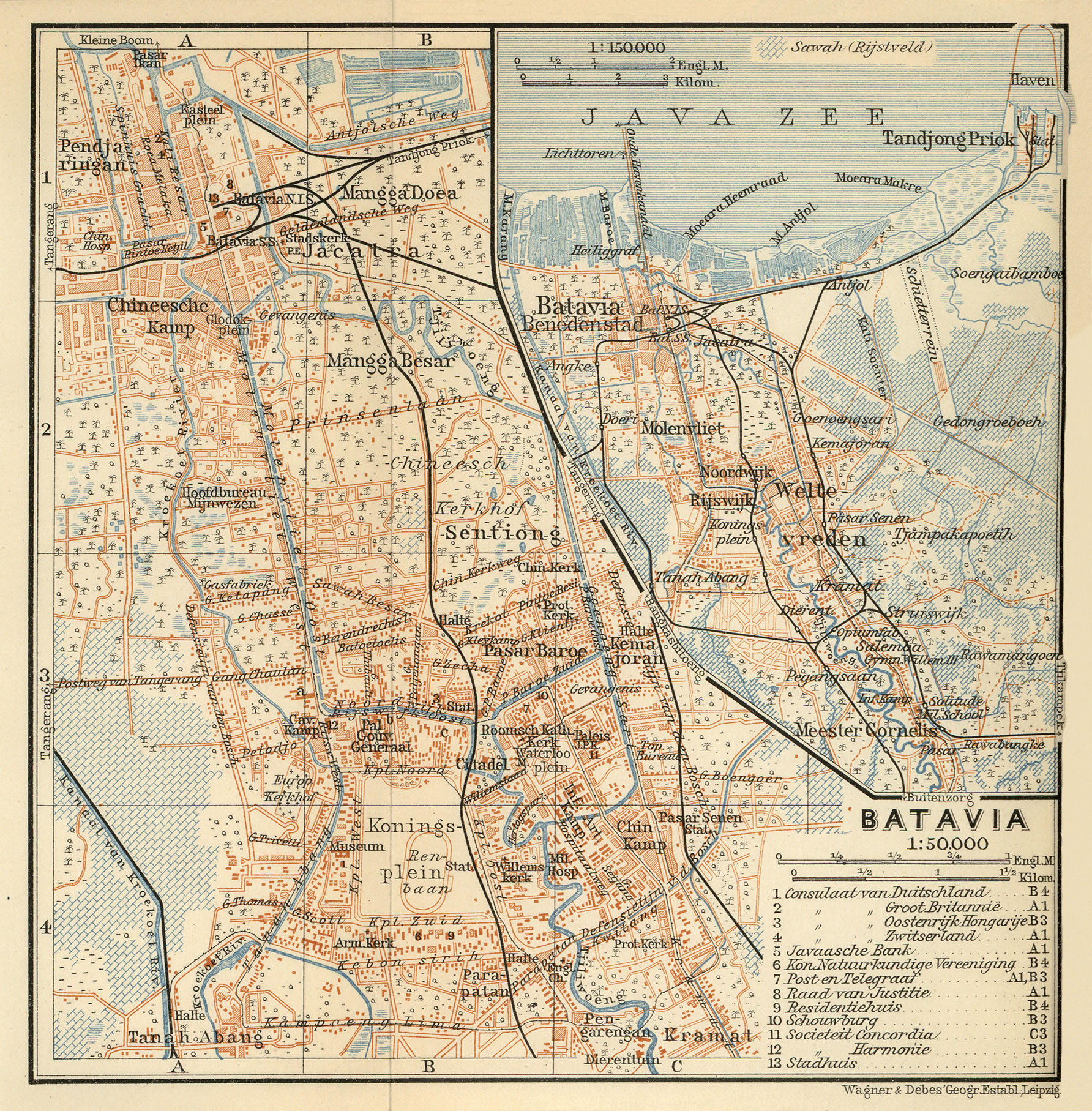
City map of Batavia (now Jakarta) in 1914

The Betawi tribe was born from acculturation between ethnicities of the archipelago and abroad, such as ethnicities from Java, Bali, Makassar, Bugis, Ambon, Sumbawa, Malacca, Chinese, Arabs, Indian, and Portuguese. They brought their respective cultures that later influenced Betawi culture, ranging from language, regional clothing, arts, to the architecture of ethnic Betawi houses. Batavia, where the Betawi tribe settled, was a coastal area with an international port. At the mouth of one of its rivers, the Ciliwung, there is the Port of Sunda Kelapa which is one of the largest ports in the archipelago.

Of the many ethnicities that entered Batavia, the most dominant influences on Betawi homes were Javanese, Sundanese, Arab and Chinese. Among the archipelago's ethnicities that entered Batavia, Sundanese and Javanese cultures had the most influence on the ethnic architecture of Betawi houses. The location of the Betawi ethnic area, which is geographically close to the Sundanese and Javanese cultural areas, is the main cause. The Betawi ethnic area was also part of the dominion of the kingdom of Banten, Demak, and Cirebon. These factors led to intensive interaction between the indigenous people living in the Batavia area and the two ethnic archipelagos. Despite its origins in the acculturation of diverse cultures, Betawi house architecture should still qualify as ethnic architecture. Betawi house architecture is said to be so because the creation of structure and construction, the organization of space layout, the use of decorative elements, and the way of making buildings that are influenced by various cultures have been passed down from generation to generation in Betawi society and only exist in Betawi culture itself.

The distinctive Betawi ethnic houses that originated from cultural acculturation only emerged when the Dutch colonial government came to power and built the city of Batavia on the model of cities in their homeland. At that time, the Dutch imposed strict rules on settlements. Indigenous people were only allowed to build their houses in inland or coastal areas. As a result of this rule, Dutch houses were located far away from the local population. As a result, the style and distinctiveness of house building territorially became increasingly different. People who live in coastal areas have stilt houses to overcome the onslaught of the waves, while people in the interior build settlements by relying on the function of the yard as plantation land or to take advantage of the shade of the trees as shade.

=== Subethnic ===
The Betawi tribe lived in the coastal area since the beginning of the city of Batavia. They lived and settled at the mouth of the Ciliwung river. Through the Ciliwung river, they spread to the center to the outskirts of Batavia. The spread then split the Betawi tribe into four sub-ethnics, consisting of Coastal Betawi, Central, Peripheral, and Udik Betawi. Coastal Betawi people live in areas near the coast, such as Marunda, Sunda Kelapa, Dadap, Thousand Islands, and others. Their dwellings are generally on stilts. This was different for the Central Betawi community who lived in the center of Batavia. Their houses generally do not have a stage, also known as Depok houses. Usually they live in the areas of Senen, Tanah Abang, Salemba, Pasar Baru, Glodok, Jatinegara, Condet, Kwitang, and others. The last is the Pinggir and Udik Betawi community. They live outside the city of Batavia, such as Tangerang, Bekasi, Depok, and parts of Bogor. Generally, their dwellings are stilted, but not as high as those of the coastal Betawi people.

Through the division of Betawi sub-ethnic cultural regions, variations in Betawi ethnic house architecture can be identified. However, the division is not the crucial factor that makes certain sub-ethnic dwellings use stilt or non-stilt concepts. The main factor is the local natural conditions. This is reasonable because there are Central/City Betawi dwellings that use the concept of stilts if they stand on the river. The same goes for the Betawi Pinggir and Udik houses. There are those from their community whose buildings are not on stilts if they stand far from the river.

== Bibliography ==
=== Books ===
- Anom, I.G.N; Sugiyanti, Sri; Hasibuan, Hadniwati; Dewi, Puspa; Ernawati; Sumono, Hardini; Supriyatun, Rini; lsmijono (1996). Hasil pemugaran Dan temuan benda cagar budaya Pembangunan Jangka Panjang Pertama (PJP I) (PDF). Jakarta: Departemen Pendidikan dan Kebudayaan.
- Departemen Kebudayaan dan Pariwisata Republik Indonesia (2002). Arsitektur Tradisional Betawi, Sumbawa, Palembang, Minahasa, dan Dani (PDF). Jakarta: Seksi Publikasi Subdit Dokumentasi dan Publikasi Direktorat Tradisi dan Kepercayaan Deputi Bidang Pelestarian dan Pengembangan Budaya Badan Pengembangan Kebudayaan dan Pariwisata.
- Idik, Mutholib; Attahiyat, Chandrian; Fachruddin, Sugiyo; Nasir, Djaelani (1986). Dapur dan Alat-Alat Memasak Tradisional Provinsi Daerah Khusus Ibukota Jakarta. Jakarta: Departemen Pendidikan dan Kebudayaan, Direktorat Jendral Kebudayaan Direktorat Sejarah dan Nilai Tradisional Proyek Inventarisasi dan Dokumentasi Budaya Daerah.
- Karim, Mulyawan, ed. (2009). Ekspedisi Ciliwung Laporan Jurnalistik Kompas. Mata Air, Air Mata. Jakarta: PT. Kompas Media Nusantara. ISBN 978-979-709-425-6.
- Lohanda, Mona (1995). Leirissa, R.Z (ed.). Sunda Kelapa Sebagai Bandar Jalur Sutra: Kumpulan Makalah Diskusi (PDF). Jakarta: Departemen Pendidikan dan Kebudayaan Direktorat Jenderal Kebudayaan Direktorat Sejarah Dan Nilai Tradisional Proyek Inventarisasi Dan Dokumentasi Sejarah Nasional. pp. 100–113.
- Lubis, Ridwan (2017). Agama dan Perdamaian: Landasan, Tujuan, dan Realitas Kehidupan Beragam di Indonesia. Jakarta: PT. Gramedia Pustaka Utama. ISBN 978-602-03-6100-0.
- Majid, M. Dien (1995). Leirissa, R.Z. (ed.). Sunda Kelapa Sebagai Bandar Jalur Sutra: Kumpulan Makalah Diskusi. Jakarta: Departemen Pendidikan dan Kebudayaan Direktorat Jenderal Kebudayaan Direktorat Sejarah Dan Nilai Tradisional Proyek Inventarisasi Dan Dokumentasi Sejarah Nasional. p. 92-78.
- Mustika, Arniz (2008). Adopsi Budaya Pada Arsitektur Betawi. Bandung: PT. Cipta Sastra Salura. ISBN 978-979-17433-2-7.
- Napitupulu, S.P.; Manurung, Jintar; Ginting, Mardyan; Badirin, Muh.; Sitomorang, O.; Sirait, H.; Silalahi, T. (1997). Arsltektur Tradisional Daerah Sumatera Utara (PDF). Jakarta: Departemen Pendidikan Dan Kebudayaan RI. Archived from the original (PDF) on 2021-08-06.
- Ruchiat, Rachmat; Wibisono, Singgih; Syamsudin, Rachmat (2003). Ikhtisar Kesenian Betawi (2 ed.). Jakarta: Dinas Kebudayaan dan Permuseuman Propinsi DKI Jakarta. ISBN 979-95292-2-0.
- Saelan, Maulwi (2008). Kesaksian Wakil Komandan Tjakrabirawa: Dari Revolusi 45 Sampai Kudeta 66. Jakarta: Visimedia.
- Saidi, Ridwan (2002). Jakarta dari Majakatera Hingga VOC. Jakarta: Yayasan Renaissance. ISBN 978-602-5133-53-4.
- Sardjono, Agung Budi (2006). Aneka Desain Rumah Bertingkat. Jakarta: Griya Kreasi. ISBN 978-979-2636-10-9.
- Suswandari (2017). Kearifan Lokal Etnik Betawi. Yogyakarta: Pustaka Pelajar. ISBN 978-602-2297-53-6.
- Swadarma, Doni; Aryanto, Yunus (2014). Rumah Etnik Betawi. Jakarta: Griya Kreasi. ISBN 978-979-6612-12-3.
- Tanjung, Anita Chairul (2018). Pesona Indonesia. Jakarta: Gramedia Pustaka Utama. ISBN 978-602-0619-16-3.

=== Journal ===
- Alamsyah P., Suwardi (2009). "Arsitektur Tradisional Rumah Betawi". Patanjala. 1 (1). Prodi Desain Interior, Fakultas Seni Rupa dan Desain, Universitas Tarumanagara: 12. doi:10.30959/patanjala.v1i1.225.
- Anggraeni, Dewi; Hakam, Ahmad; Mardhiah, Izzatul; Lubis, Zulkifli (2019). "Membangun Peradaban Bangsa Melalui Religiusitas Berbasis Budaya Lokal (Analisis Tradisi Palang Pintu Pada Budaya Betawi)". Jurnal Studi Al-Qur'an Membangun Tradisi Berfikir Qur'ani. 15 (1). doi:10.21009/JSQ.015.1.05.
- Hasan, Raziq; Prabowo, Hendro (2002). "Perubahan Bentuk dan Fungsi Arsitektur Tradisional Bugis di Kawasan Pesisir Kamal Muara, Jakarta Utara". Mezanin. Department of Architecture Gunadarma University.
- Leo, Fenny; Tanmin, Joelene; Frendy; Ika, Augustin (2019). "Analisis Ornamen Budaya Betawi pada Elemen Desain Interior. Studi Kasus: Restoran Kafe Betawi di Mal Central Park Kota Jakarta Barat". Mezanin. 1 (1). Prodi Desain Interior, Fakultas Seni Rupa dan Desain, Universitas Tarumanagara.
- Moechtar, Muhammad Syaiful; Sarwadana, Sang Made; Semarajaya, Cokorda Gede Alit (2012). "Identifikasi Pola Permukiman Tradisional Kampung Budaya Betawi Setu Babakan, Kelurahan Srengseng Sawah, Kecamatan Jagakarsa, Kota Administrasi Jakarta Selatan, Provinsi DKI Jakarta". E-Jurnal Agroekoteknologi Tropika. 1 (2). ISSN 2301-6515.
- Nur, Desiana (2016). "Analisis Filsafat Seni Filosofi Rumah Tradisional Masyarakat Bekasi Atau Melayu Betawi Sebagai Artefak Seni Yang Dihasilkan Oleh Pola Pikir Adat Dan Budaya Masyarakatnya" (PDF). Jurnal Teknologi. 5 (2). ISSN 2088-3315.
- Salim, Polniwati (2015). "Memaknai Arsitektur dan Ragam Hias pada Rumah Khas Betawi di Jakarta Sebagai Upaya Pelestarian Budaya Bangsa" (PDF). Humaniora: Language, People, Art, and Communication Studies. 6 (3): 395–402. doi:10.21512/humaniora.v6i3.3365. ISSN 2087-1236.}
- Wijayanti, Gresceila; Chintya, Resya; Nurhasanah (2019). "Penerapan Balaksuji dan Langkan pada Rumah Tradisional Betawi di Kampung Betawi, Jakarta Selatan". Mezanin. 1 (1). Universitas Tarumanagara Fakultas Seni Rupa Dan Desain.

=== Other ===
- Habitat for Humanity Indonesia (2016). "Rumah Tipe Panggung" (PDF). habitatindonesia. Archived from the original (PDF) on 2019-04-30.
