= F. D. J. Pangemanann =

Minahasa journalist and novelist

Frederick D. J. Pangemanann (also Pangemanan; 1870–1910) was a journalist and novelist from the Dutch East Indies.

== Biography ==
Frederick Pangemanann was born to the Pangemanan clan of Minahasa in 1870. Some sources report that he worked for the Dutch colonial government before retiring and becoming a journalist, but Indonesian writer and literary critic Pramoedya Ananta Toer believes this illogical owing to Pangemanann's young age at his time of death; Toer does, however, allow for the possibility of Pangemanann having become injured in the line of duty, forcing an early retirement.

Around 1894 Pangemanann became a reporter for the Malay-language daily Bintang Betawi, based in the colonial capital of Batavia (now Jakarta). By this time he was already active in writing fiction. His story Tjerita Rossina was published as a serial in the newspaper.

Pangemanann published his first novel, Tjerita Si Tjonat (The Story of Tjonat), in 1900. A reputed success, the novel followed the rise and fall of a bandit known as Tjonat. His second and final novel, a collation of the serial Tjerita Rossina, was published three years later. Both were bandit stories and used similar formulas.

In 1902 Pangemanann began helping with the daily Warna Warta. After Bintang Betawi was shut down in 1906, Pangemanann went to the peranakan Chinese-owned daily Kabar Perniagaan (later Perniagaan). In 1906 he was an establishing member of the colony's first press council. Pangemanann died in 1910.

== Reception ==
Tjerita Si Tjonat was a commercial success. It was soon adapted for the stage, and in 1929 Nelson Wong directed a film adaptation. Tjerita Rossina likewise was quickly adapted for the stage. The novel was reprinted in 1910 but credited to H.F.R. Kommer; Toer considers this blatant plagiarism, although he notes that there were no copyright laws in the Indies at the time. However, it appears that both are Malay adaptations of a story, published earlier in Dutch under the title De arme Rosetta, by W. L. Ritter, a Dutchman living and working in Borneo. Tjerita Rossina was later adapted as a syair (poem) by Tulis Sutan Sati (published by Balai Pustaka in 1933).

Indonesianist C. W. Watson writes that Pangemanann, together with the Indo journalists F. H. Wiggers and H. Kommer, was "most responsible for giving a stimulus and a direction to the writing of original stories in an Indonesian setting". He notes that all three were fluent in Malay and appeared comfortable in both native and ethnic Chinese communities.
