= Lenong =

Indonesian folk theatre of Betawi people

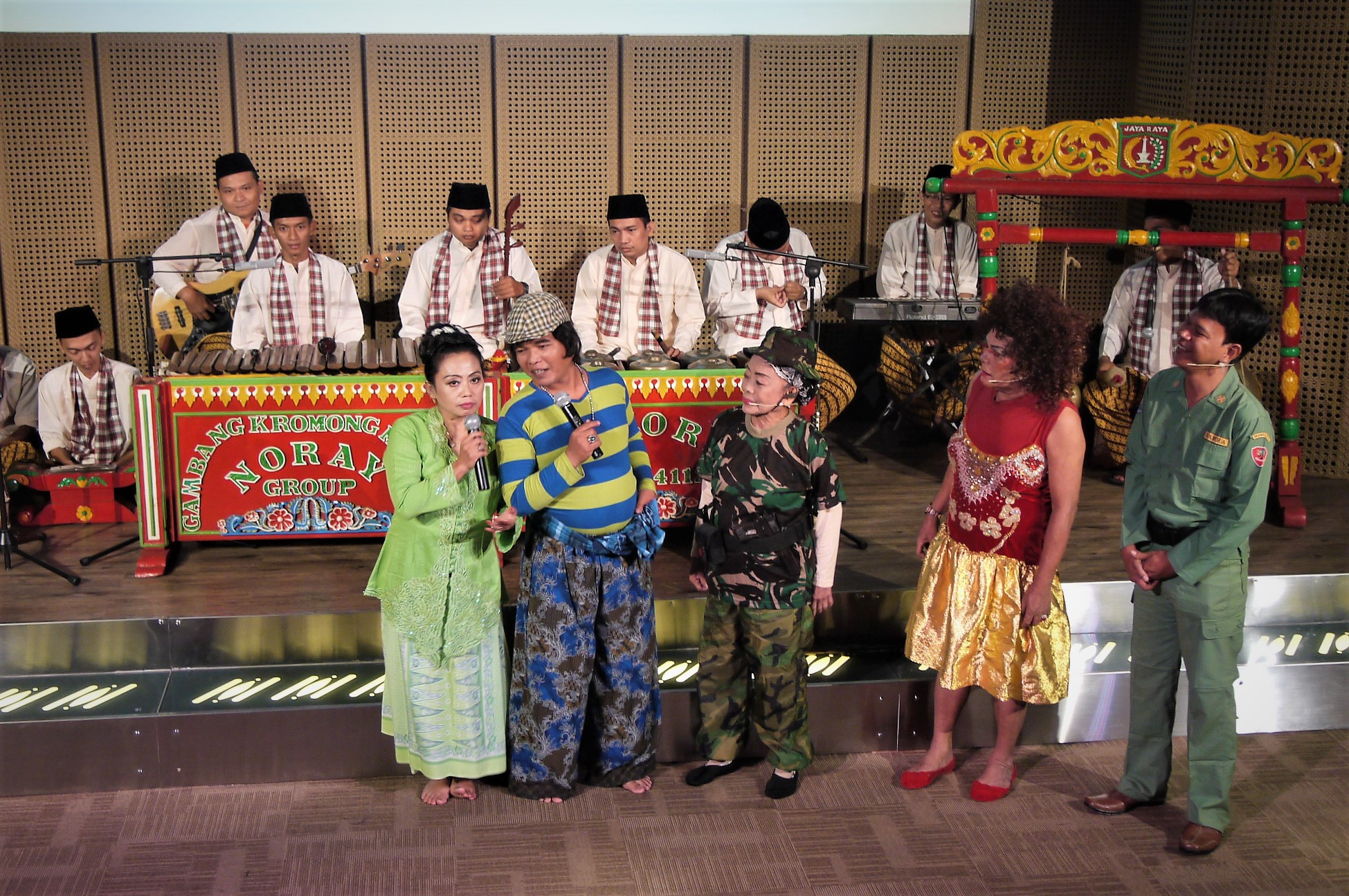
- A modern lenong performance
- Types: Traditional theatre
- Ancestor arts: Betawi people
- Originating culture: Indonesia

Lenong is a traditional theatrical form of the Betawi people in Jakarta, Indonesia.

== Description ==
Lenong is a form of theatre traditional to the Betawi people of Jakarta, Indonesia. Dialogue is generally in the Betawi dialect. Actions and dialogue are often presented in a humorous manner on top of a stage known as a pentas tapal kuda, so named for the way actors enter the stage from the left and right. Audiences sit in front of the stage. The number of performers is determined by the needs of the story. Male performers are referred to as panjak, while female performers are known as ronggeng.

A performance is generally opened with a prayer, known as ungkup, and a ritual offering before introducing the performers. Gambang kromong is one of the musical genres which may accompany a performance. Musicians may use various instruments, including flutes, gongs, accordions, or drums. The songs are traditionally quite formulaic, and several songs are common in performances, including "Cente Manis" and "Jali-Jali". Chinese musical influences can be seen.

Performances can be classified under many genres, although most are about heroes or criminals; tales adapted from folklore, such as from the One Thousand and One Nights, are also common. In broad strokes there are two main subdivisions of lenong, namely lenong denes and lenong preman. Stories in lenong denes focus on the exploits of the nobility, the rich, and the powerful. Lenong preman stories are always about commoners or folk heroes. The type of performance will affect the costumes worn. Stories are not memorised from a script. Rather, performers will memorise an orally-presented outline and follow that, with improvisation as necessary.

== History ==
Lenong developed from the earlier form Gambang Rancag. In its earlier years, beginning around the turn of the twentieth century, it was promoted by ethnic Chinese. This has left fairly extensive Chinese influences in the genre.

Lenong performances from the 1920s and 1930s often focused on the exploits of bandits, including Si Pitung and Si Tjonat. These bandits, though portrayed as despicable people by Dutch and ethnic Chinese writers, became more Robin Hood-like in lenong; Si Pitung, for instance, became a humble person, a good Muslim, a hero of Betawi people, and an upholder of justice.

During the 1950s, Sudiro, the governor of Jakarta, restricted performances of traditional theatre such as lenong. Meanwhile, lenong performances were unable to compete in the market due to the booming domestic film industry. Troupes had to go from kampung to kampung, offering performances for money which, ultimately, was not always enough to survive on. By the early 1960s lenong was nearly extinct.

During the 1970s, Governor Ali Sadikin gave greater freedom to traditional culture. In this atmosphere, cultural critic and film director D. Djajakusuma worked to promote and preserve lenong, with regular performances at Taman Ismail Marzuki; as a result, S. M. Ardan considers him as having saved the genre. Many lenong actors, including Benyamin Sueb, Mandra, and Enung Tile bin Bayan, began making films in the 1970s.

In the early 1990s, Lenong started to be televised when Harry de Fretes combined lenong and sitcoms to create Lenong Rumpi (literally Gossip Lenong). This was aired on RCTI from 1991 to 1992. Unlike stage performances, performers on this televised lenong were mostly not native Betawi speakers.

== See also ==
- Ketoprak
- Ludruk

== Works cited ==
- Ardan, S.M. (1 November 1987). "Djaduk Djajakusuma Bukan Cuma Pengabdi Seni" [Djaduk Djajakusuma Was Not Only Into the Arts]. Suara Pembaruan (in Indonesian). p. 11.
- "Lenong". Encyclopedia of Jakarta (in Indonesian). Jakarta City Government. Archived from the original on 16 January 2013.
- Loven, Klarijn (2008). Watching Si Doel: Television, Language, and Culture Identity in Contemporary Indonesia. Leiden: KITLV Press. ISBN 9789067182799.
- Shahab, Alwi (2001). Robinhood Betawi: Kisah Betawi Tempo Doeloe [Robinhood of Jakarta: Tales of Old Jakarta] (in Indonesian). Jakarta: Republika. ISBN 9789793210001. OCLC 48517713.
- van Till, Margreet (1996). "In Search of Si Pitung: The History of an Indonesian Legend". Bijdragen tot de Taal-, Land- en Volkenkunde. 152 (3): 461–482. doi:10.1163/22134379-90003007. ISSN 0006-2294. OCLC 770588866.
- Toer, Pramoedya Ananta, ed. (1982). Tempo Doeloe: Antologi Sastra Pra-Indonesia [Earlier Times: Anthology of Pre-Indonesian Literature] (in Indonesian). Jakarta: Hasta Mitra. OCLC 9797224.
