= Si Pitung =

19th-century Indonesian bandit

Si Pitung (Old spelling: Si Pitoeng; or sometimes written just Pitung) was a 19th-century bandit in Batavia, Dutch East Indies (modern-day Jakarta, Indonesia). His exploits have become legendary since then, with numerous accounts of his life, deeds, and death.

== Biography ==
Pitung was born in Pengumben, a slum in Rawabelong (near modern-day Palmerah Station), to Bung Piung and Mbak Pinah in what is today West Jakarta; he was the fourth son born to the couple. His real name was Salihoen. Based on oral tradition, the name Pitung is derived from pituan pitulung (Javanese for "group of seven"). As a child, Salihoen studied at Hadji Naipin's Islamic boarding school. Aside from learning his prayers, he also received training in pencak and situational awareness.

Pitung's criminal career started after money earned from the sale of his father's goats was stolen in Tanah Abang. His father forced him to compensate for the loss. As a result, he chased down the thief. This incident made him known as a 'jago', a cocky person or local legend. Later, Pitung invited his friends – Dji-ih, Rais, and Jebul – to rob Hadji Sapiudin, a wealthy landowner who lived northeast of Batavia, on 30 July 1892. One telling has it that the four men posed as civil servants and stated that Sapiudin was under investigation for fraud but offered to keep his money in safekeeping. Sapiudin surrendered the money, unaware that he was being conned. The police suspected that the robbers had used guns to threaten the house owner and neighbors. Some tellings have Pitung stealing money only from rich persons who had collaborated with the Dutch colonial overlords.

According to the daily Hindia Olanda, on 18 July 1892 a schout (kind of police officer) in Tanah Abang rummaged through Bitoeng's house in one of villages of Sukabumi. (Note: The newspaper Hindia Olanda first referred to him as Bitoeng, then sometimes as Pitang. Within a few months, he was consistently called Si Pitoeng.) During the search, a black coat, a police uniform, and a cap were discovered. Those items were allegedly used by Pitung and his comrades to rob a village. The next month, 125 guilders were found concealed under the house. The money was supposedly from the robbery of a Mrs. De C. and Hadji Sapiudin.

His crimes received the attention of A.W.V. Hinne, a police officer who was stationed in Batavia from 1888 to 1912. Hinne wanted to capture Pitung and had caught him once. However, Pitung had escaped with the help of his gang members; folklore attributes the escape to Pitung's magical powers. Reports differ on what happened next. One account gives Hinne convincing Pitung's former teacher Hadji Naipin to reveal what talisman (jimat) gave Pitung his powers. Another version has Hinne asking Pitung's comrades (excluding Dji-ih, who was highly loyal to Pitung) the same question; these comrades betrayed Pitung. The jimat itself differs depending on the retelling. One source says it was his kris (a kind of dagger). Another says it was his hair, and his power would weaken if his hair was cut. Some sources suggest that Pitung would lose his supernatural powers if he was pelted with rotten eggs.

Eventually, Hinne was able to kill Pitung. According to the report in the Dutch-language Locomotief, the historical Pitung was caught in an ambush and killed by Hinne and several assistants; some Indonesian tellings indicate that Pitung's family had been arrested and tortured to draw him out. A detail found in folklore, but not present in accounts from the period, is that Hinne shot and killed Pitung with a golden bullet.

Pitung was buried in a cemetery in Sukabumi (now part of Jakarta). Hinne was awarded the title Broeder van de Nederlandsche Leeuw (Brother of the Dutch Lion) for his part in stopping Pitung. When the city began to develop, most of the cemetery where Pitung was buried was built over with the head offices of Telkom Indonesia. However, the grave remained undisturbed and was often the site of pilgrimages for those seeking mystical powers. Another mythic figure, a Moluccan named Jonker, is buried nearby.

== Description ==
In the lenong version, Pitung is described as a humble person, a good Muslim, a hero of Betawi people, and an upholder of justice. According to Indonesian author and screenwriter Lukman Karmani, who wrote about Pitung in the 1960s, the bandit was an Indonesian Robin Hood, stealing from the rich to give to the poor. In Si Pitoeng, a 1931 film and the first produced about Pitung's life, he was shown as a real bandit. However, in the 1970 film of the same name, Pitung's characteristics were closer to the traditional Indonesian depictions. The Indonesian-run newspaper Hindia Olanda described Pitung as a "colorful figure" in its first reports.

According to the Dutch scholar Margareet van Till, views of Pitung vary depending on ethnicity. The Dutch despised him, while the Chinese and natives respected him.

== Popular culture ==
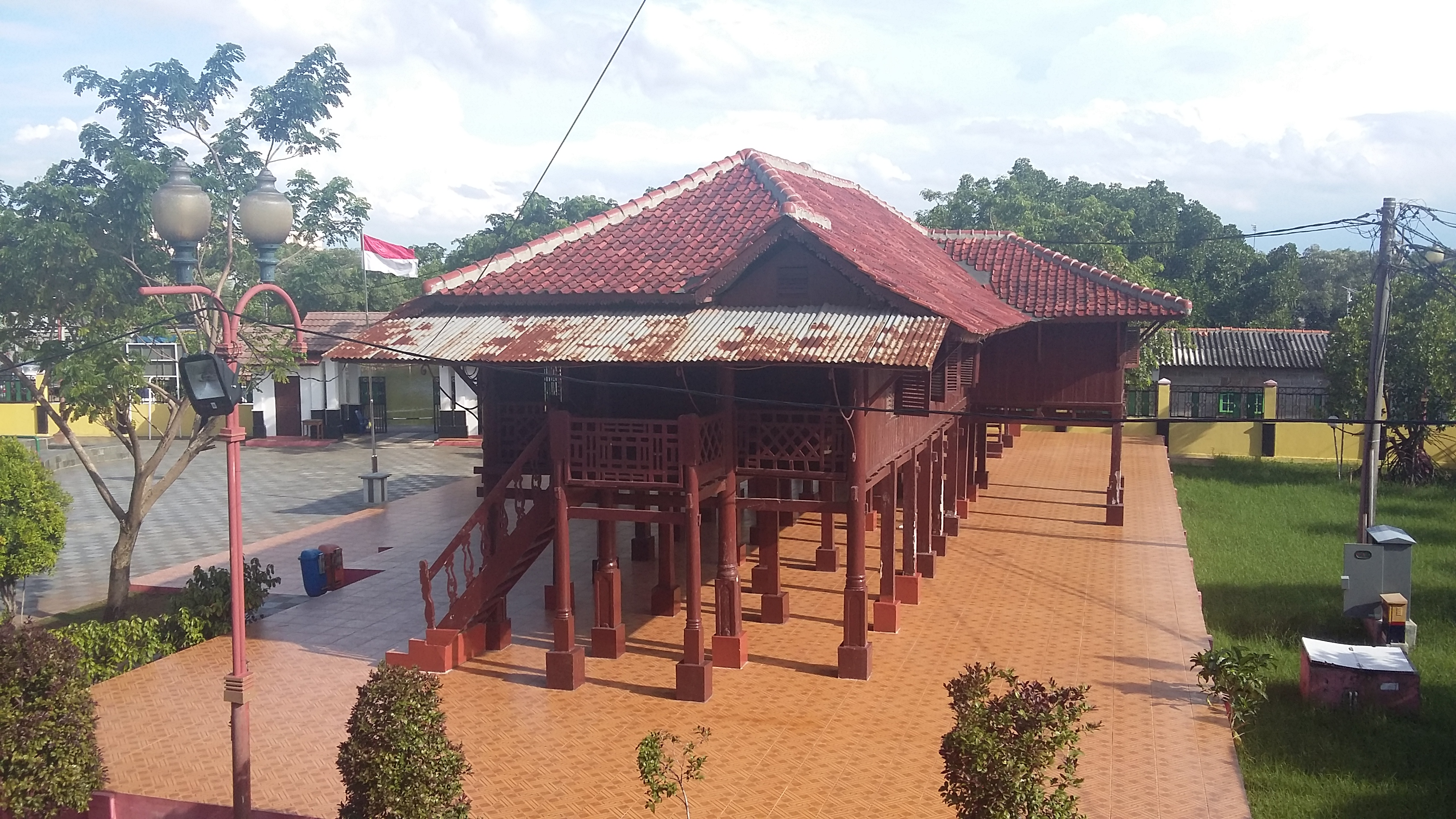
Rumah Si Pitung ("Si Pitung's House"), now a museum.

Pitung's story appears in rancak (a kind of ballad), syair (narrative poems), and lenong (folk-plays performed by semi-professional actors).

Several modern depictions of Pitung's story exist. One of the earliest, and the first film, was made in 1931. It was entitled Si Pitoeng and produced by the Wong brothers, American-trained directors of Chinese descent. The film starred Herman Shin as Pitung and the keroncong singer Ining Resmini as a love interest. Several novels were published in the 1970s, with several films also released in that decade. One of the most successful films about Pitung from that period was Si Pitung, which was released in August 1970 and became the most watched of the year, viewed by 141,140 persons; this version also introduced a love interest named Aisjah. In May 1971, the film Banteng Betawi was released as the sequel of Si Pitung, which tells of the death of Pitung; two other sequels followed, in 1977 and 1981. There were also television series made about him.

Si Pitung Museum, a house which reportedly belonged to Hadji Sapiudin, is located in Marunda. The house has also been said to be Pitung's.
