= Betawi people =

Austronesian ethnic group

Orang Betawi
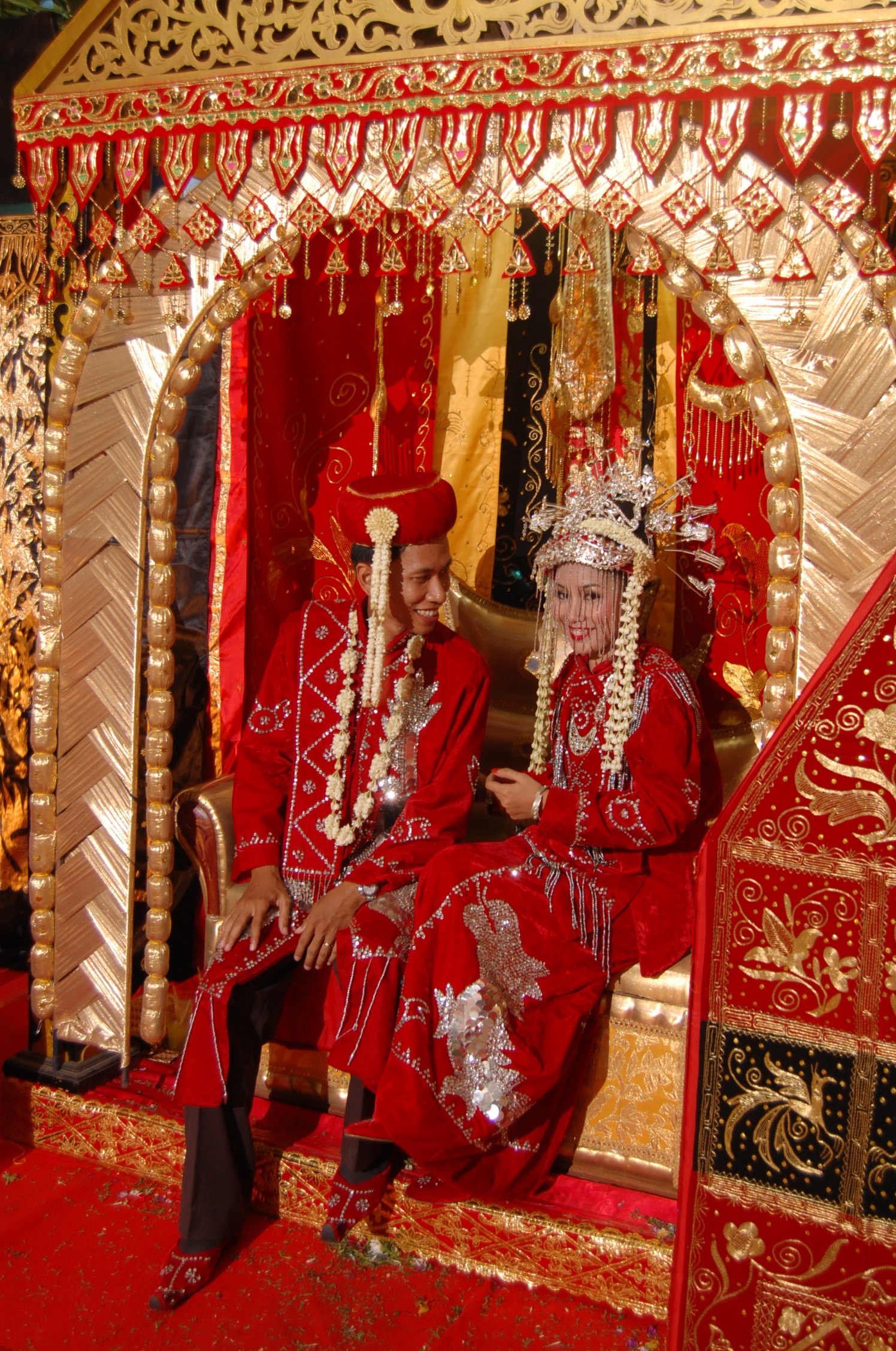
- Betawi wedding costume demonstrate both Middle Eastern (groom) and Chinese (bride) influences.

Total population
- c.7 million

Regions with significant populations
- Indonesia (Greater Jakarta)

Languages
- Native; Betawi, Indonesian; Also; Arabic (religious only)

Religion
- Majority; Islam (97.25%); Minorities; Christians (Protestantism (1.6%), Catholicism (0.6%)), Buddhism (0.5%), other (0.05%)

Related ethnic groups
- Austronesian peoples; Sundanese; Javanese; Balinese; Ambonese; Buginese; Cape Malays; Cocos Malays; Javanese; Makassar; Malays; Minangkabaus; Arab Indonesians, Chinese Indonesians (especially Benteng Chinese), Indos, Mardijkers, Indian Indonesians

Betawi people or Batavians (Orang Betawi in Indonesian, meaning "people of Batavia"), are an Austronesian ethnic group native to the city of Jakarta and its immediate outskirts, and as such often described as the inhabitants of the city. They are the descendants of the people who inhabited Batavia (the Dutch colonial name of Jakarta) from the 17th century onwards.

The term Betawi people emerged in the 18th century as an amalgamation of various ethnic groups into Batavia. In the modern era, people of various ethnicities, especially Sundanese people, who have long inhabited Greater Jakarta, forgetting their language and switching to Betawi, can also be called Betawi people. Although if they are related by blood, they are more like people who still speak Sundanese language in the outskirts, especially in Bekasi, Bogor, and Tangerang.

== Origin and history ==
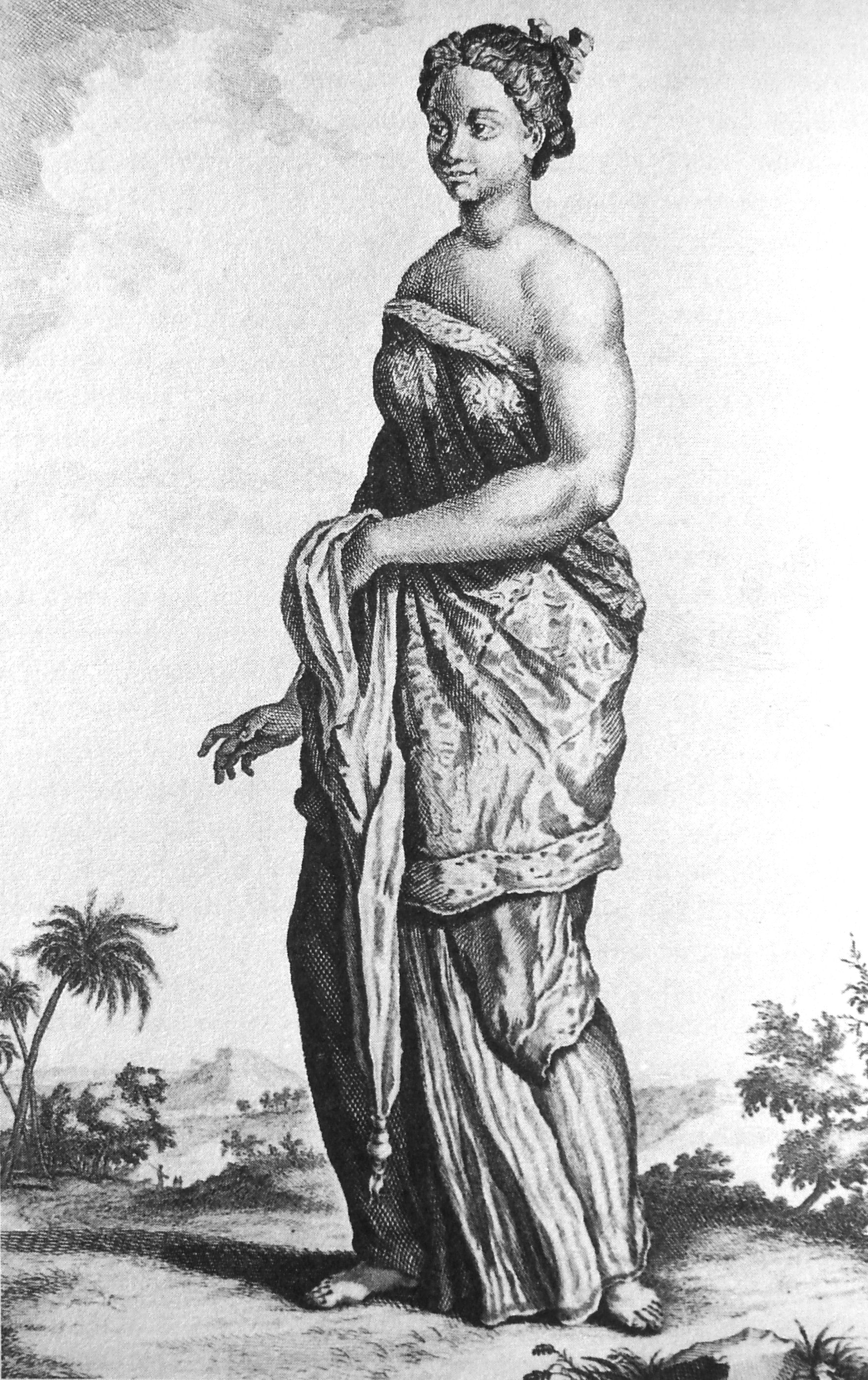
Many coolies and slaves were employed from outside Java to Batavia, Dutch East Indies.

The Betawi are one of the most recently formed ethnic groups in Indonesia. They are a creole ethnic group, with ancestors coming from various parts of Indonesia and abroad. Before the 19th century, the self-identity of the Betawi people was not yet formed. The name Betawi is adopted from the native rendering of the term "Batavia" city which was originally named after the Batavi, an ancient Germanic tribe.

In the 17th century, after the original population had been expelled and the city of Jayakarta had been burned down, the Dutch colonial authorities began building the city of Batavia and repopulating it.

The repopulation was to strengthen the trading interests of the VOC and not endanger them. Javanese, Sundanese and other population groups with whom the VOC was at war were not allowed in the city and the surrounding areas (the Ommelanden) in the early period.

After it became apparent that it was not in the VOC's interest to establish a Dutch colony, a small top layer of Dutch administrators, a loyal mixed Christian European-Asian layer, a layer of free Asians and a large layer of slaves were chosen.

The population from the early period looked as follows:

- Slaves imported by the VOC: From coastal areas of India, Bangladesh, Sri Lanka, Thailand, Malaysia, the Philippines, Africa and various parts of Indonesia.
- Free(d) Christian citizens from former Portuguese settlements.
- A large group of Chinese workers who had fled to Dutch Formosa because of the war in Fujian.
- Other Free Asians
- Slaves in the service of Asian residents: originating from Bali, Makassar, Borneo, Bone/Buton, Timor, Sumbawa, Banten, Sukadana, Cirebon, Malabar and other regions.

After a truce with the kingdom of Mataram, Javanese and Sundanese also came to live there.

By the end of the seventeenth century, the Batavian population consisted of approximately 7% Dutch, 20% Christian Asians and mestizos, 10% Chinese, 12% Malays, Javanese and Balinese, and over 50% slaves.

One of the earliest were Balinese slaves bought from Bali and Ambonese mercenaries. Subsequently, other ethnic groups followed suit; they were Malays, Sundanese, Javanese, Minangkabaus, Buginese, and Makassar. Foreign and mixed ethnic groups were also included; such as Indos, Mardijkers, Portuguese, Dutch, Arabs, Chinese, and Indians, who were originally brought to or attracted to Batavia to work.

Originally, circa the 17th to 18th century, the dwellers of Batavia were identified according to their ethnics of origin; either Sundanese, Javanese, Malays, Ambonese, Buginese-Makassar, or Arabs and Chinese. This was shown in the Batavia census record that listed the immigrant's ethnic background of Batavian citizens. They were separated into specific ethnic-based enclaves kampungs, which is why in today's Jakarta there are some regions named after ethnic-specific names such as Kampung Melayu, Kampung Bali, Makassar, and Kampung Ambon. These ethnic groups merged and formed around the 18th to 19th centuries. It was not until the late 19th or early 20th century that the group – who would become the dwellers of Batavia, referred to themselves as "Betawi", which refers to a Creole Malay-speaking ethnic group that has a mixed culture of different influences; Malay, Javanese, Sundanese to Arabic and Chinese. The Betawi people have a culture and language distinct from the surrounding Sundanese and Javanese. The Betawis are known for their traditions in music and food.

== Language ==
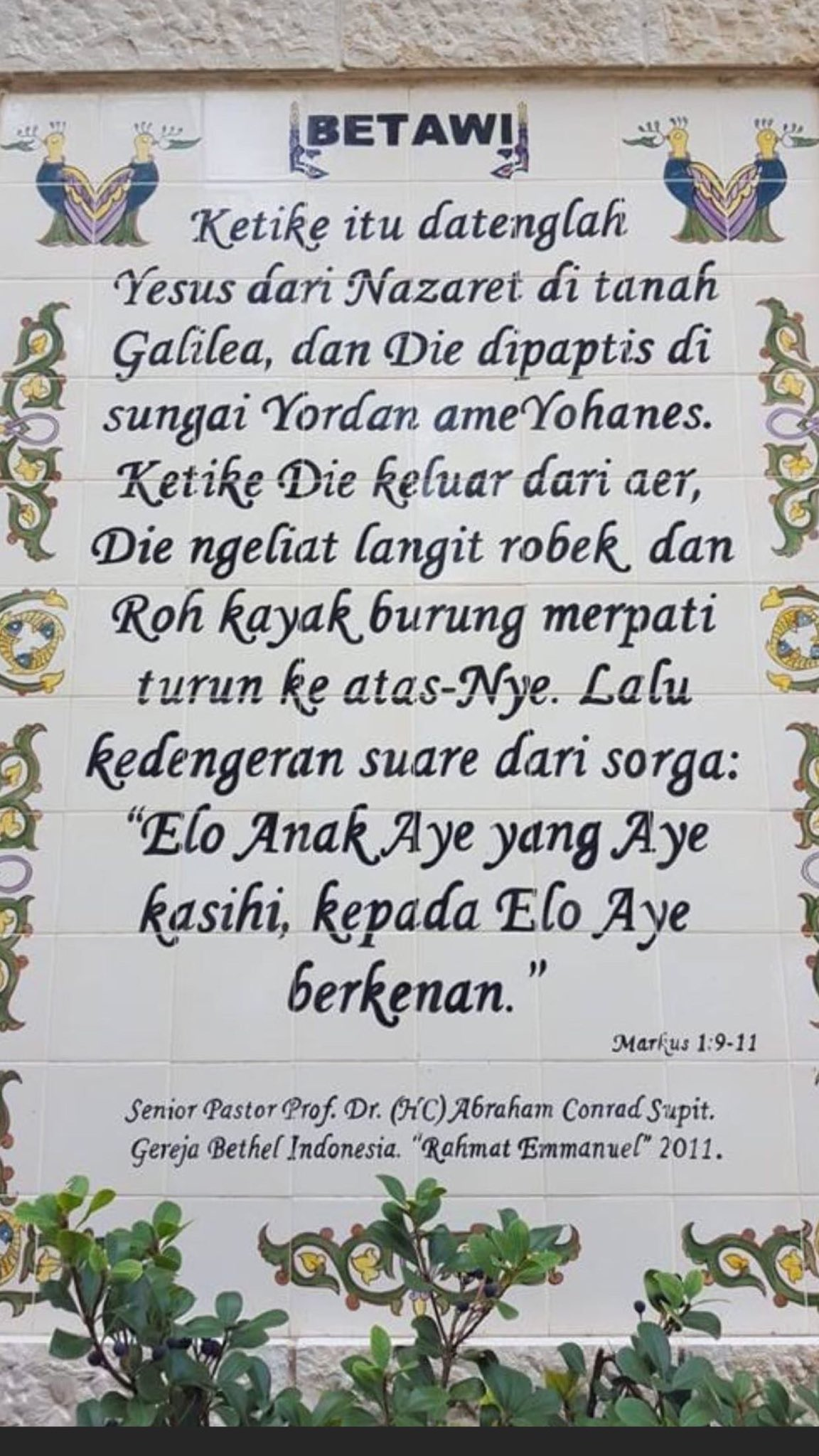
Mark 1:9–11, written in the Betawi language

The Betawi language, also known as Betawi Malay, is a Malay-based creole language. It was the only Malay-based dialect spoken on the northern coast of Java; other northern Java coastal areas are overwhelmingly dominated by Javanese dialects, while some parts speak Madurese and Sundanese. The Betawi vocabulary has many Hokkien Chinese, Arabic, and Dutch loanwords. Today the Betawi language is a popular informal language in Indonesia and used as the base of Indonesian slang. It has become one of the most widely spoken languages in Indonesia, and also one of the most active local dialects in the country.

== Society ==
Due to their historical sentiment as a marginalized ethnic group in their native land, the Betawi people form several communal organizations to protect themselves from other ethnic groups and strengthen the Betawi solidarity. Notable organizations include the Forum Betawi Rempug (FBR), Forum Komunikasi Anak Betawi (Communication Forum for Betawi People, Forkabi), and Ikatan Keluarga Betawi (Betawi Family Network, IKB). These organizations act as grassroots movements to increase the bargaining power of the Betawi people whose significant part of them are economically relegated to the informal sector. Some of them hold a significantly large number of followers; for example, as of 2021, Forkabi has a membership of 500,000 people across the Jabodetabek region.

== Religion ==
Religion of Betawinese
1. Sunni Islam (97.1%)
2. Protestantism (1.60%)
3. Roman Catholicism (0.62%)
4. Buddhism (0.57%)
5. Hinduism (0.02%)
6. Other (0.03%)

A substantial majority of the Betawi people follow Sunni Islam. Anthropologist Fachry Ali of IAIN Pekalongan considers that Islam is one of the main sources for the formation of the Betawi culture and identity, and as such these two cannot be separated. The element of Islam can be seen in many parts of Betawi society. For example, the Forum Betawi Rempug (FBR), a Betawi organization, considers the ethos of their organization to be the three S's: Sholat (prayer), Silat (martial arts), and Sekolah (pesantren-based education). Betawi people often strongly emphasize their Islamic identity in their writings, which is observed by many foreign academics. Susan Abeyasekere of Monash University observed that many of the Betawi people are devout and orthodox Muslims.

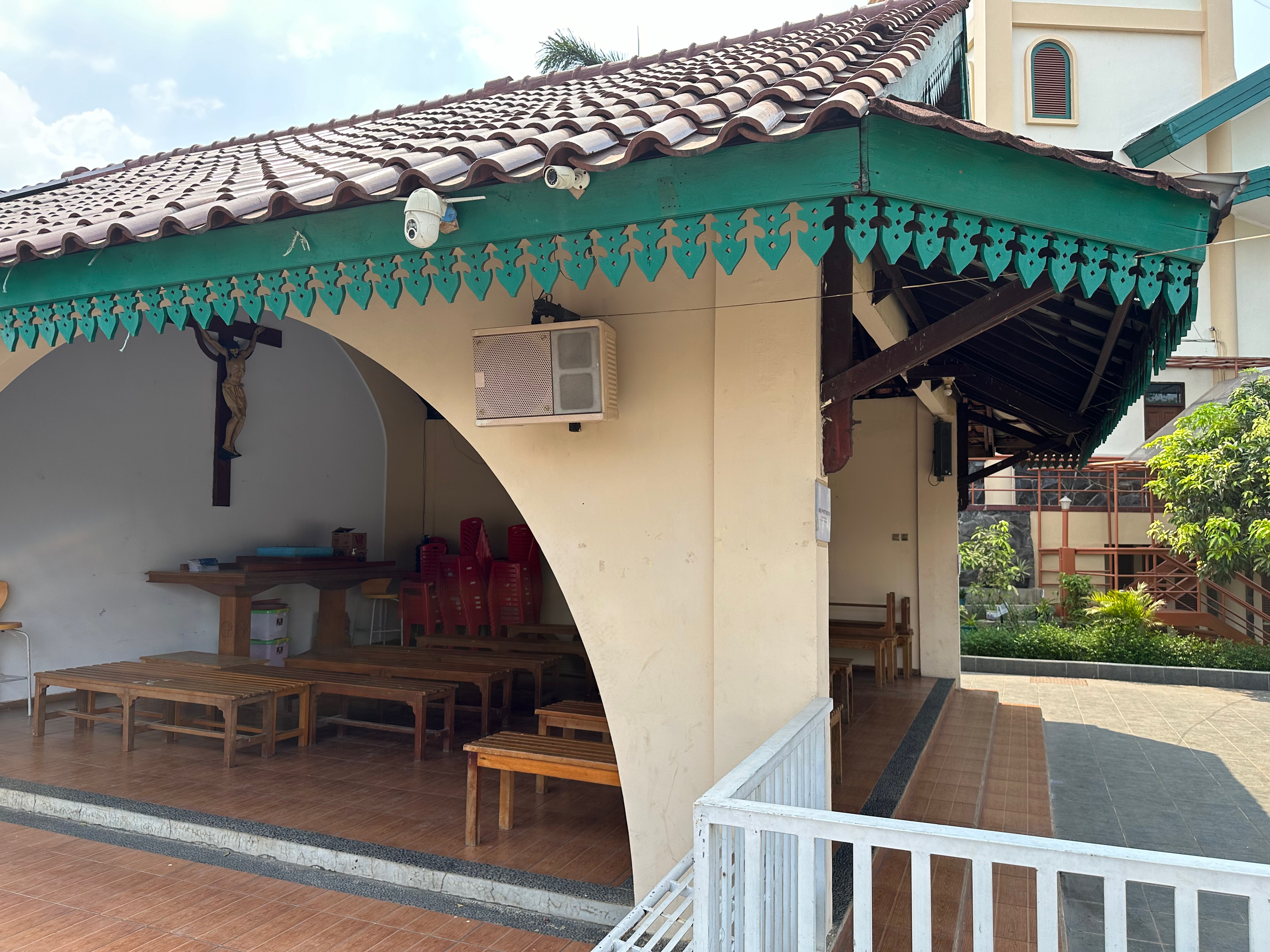
A Betawi church in Bekasi

There are Betawi people who profess the Christian faith. Among the Betawi ethnic Christians, some have claimed that they are the descendants of the Portuguese Mardijker who intermarried with the local population, who mainly settled in the area of Kampung Tugu, North Jakarta. Although today Betawi culture is often perceived as Muslim culture, it also has other roots which include Christian Portuguese and Chinese Peranakan culture. Recently, there has been an ongoing debate on defining Betawi culture and identity—as mainstream Betawi organizations are criticized for only accommodating Muslim Betawi while marginalizing non-Muslim elements within Betawi culture—such as Portuguese Christian Betawi Tugu and Tangerang Buddhist Cina Benteng community.

Meester Anthing became the first to bring Christianity to the Betawi community of Kampung Sawah, and founded the Protestant Church of Kampung Sawah, by combining mysticism, Betawi culture, and Christianity. However this community split into three rival factions in 1895, the first faction was led by Guru Laban based in West Kampung Sawah, the second faction was under Yoseh based in East Kampung Sawah, and the third under Guru Nathanael which was dismissed from the Protestant Church of Kampung Sawah and seek refuge in Jakarta Cathedral and adopted Catholicism. The Catholic St. Servatius Church in Kampung Sawah, Bekasi, which traces its origin to the Guru Nathanael community, uses Betawi culture and language in its mass. A practice that is shared by other churches in Kampung Sawah.

Religions	Total
Islam	6,607,019
Christianity	151,429
Buddhism	39,278
Hinduism	1,161
Others	2,056
Overall	6,800,943

== Culture ==
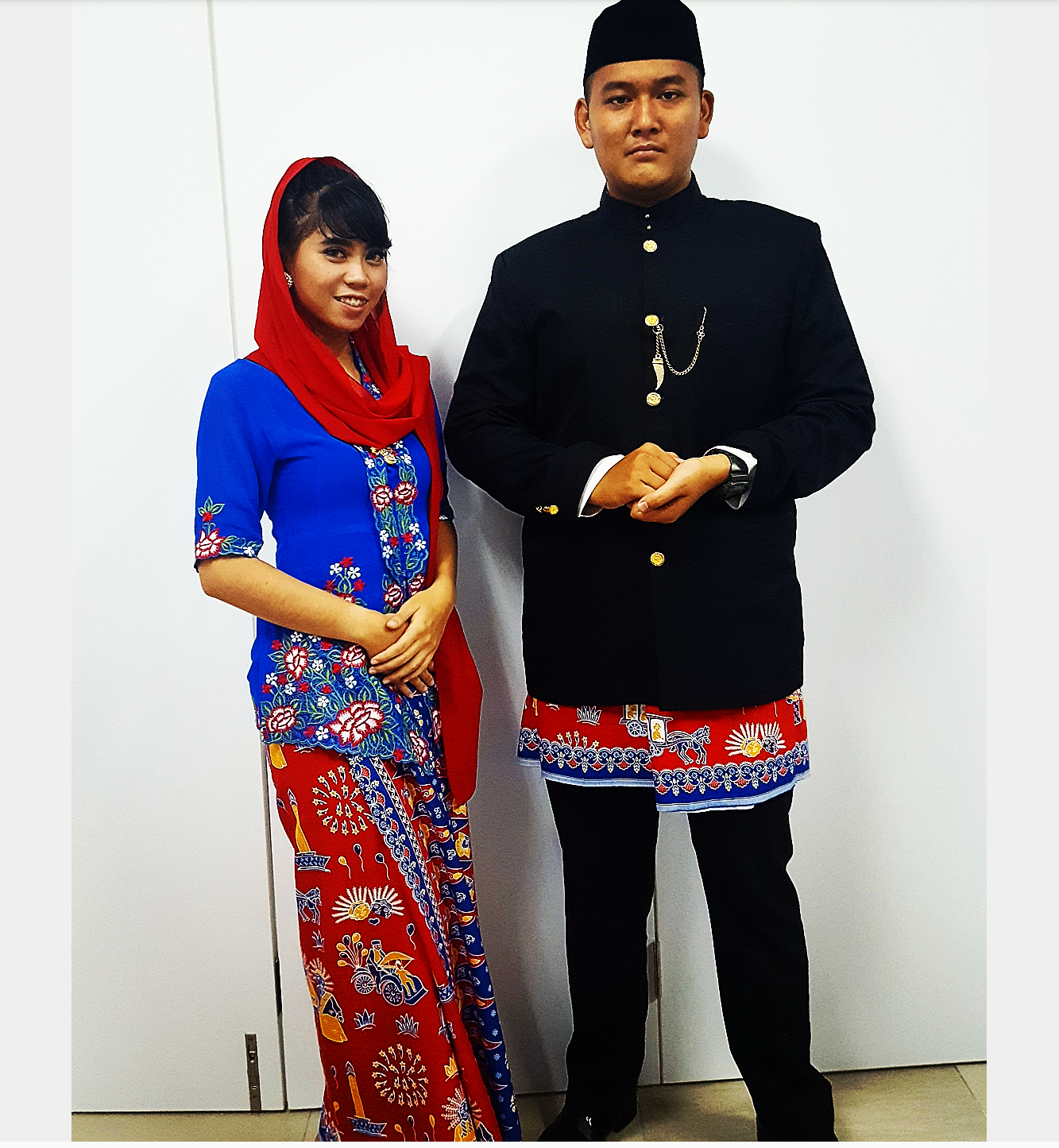
Betawi traditional dress is known as Baju Demang or Ujung Serong (male) and kebaya encim (female).

The culture and art form of the Betawi people demonstrates the influences experienced by them throughout their history. Foreign influences are visible, such as Portuguese and Chinese influences on their music, and Sundanese, Javanese, and Chinese influences in their dances. Contrary to popular perception, which believes that Betawi culture is currently marginalized and under pressure from the more dominant neighbouring Javanese and Sundanese cultures—Betawi culture is thriving since it is being adopted by immigrants who have settled in Jakarta. The Betawi culture also has become an identity for the city, promoted through municipal government patronage. The Betawi dialect is often spoken in TV shows and dramas.

=== Architecture ===
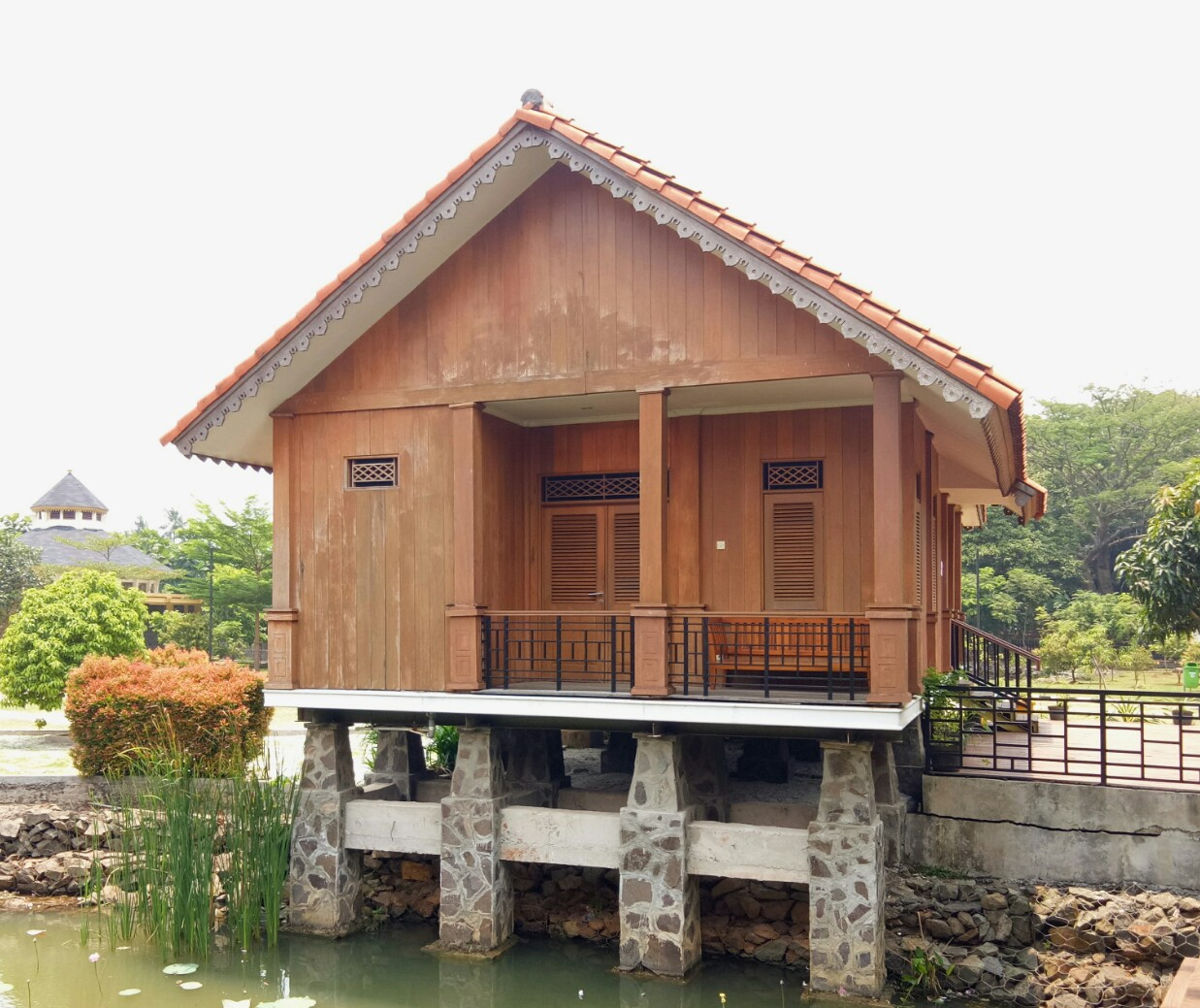
Rumah kebaya, Betawi traditional house

Traditionally Betawi people are not urban dwellers living in gedong (European-style building) or two-storied Chinese rumah toko (shophouse) clustered in and around Batavia city walls. They are living in kampungs around the city filled with orchards. As Jakarta becomes more and more densely populated, so do Betawi traditional villages that have mostly now turned into a densely packed urban village with humble houses tucked in between high-rise buildings and main roads. Some of the more authentic Betawi villages survived only on the outskirts of the city, such as in Setu Babakan, Jagakarsa, South Jakarta bordering with Depok area, West Java. Traditional Betawi houses can be found in Betawi traditional kampung (villages) in Condet and Setu Babakan area, East and South Jakarta.

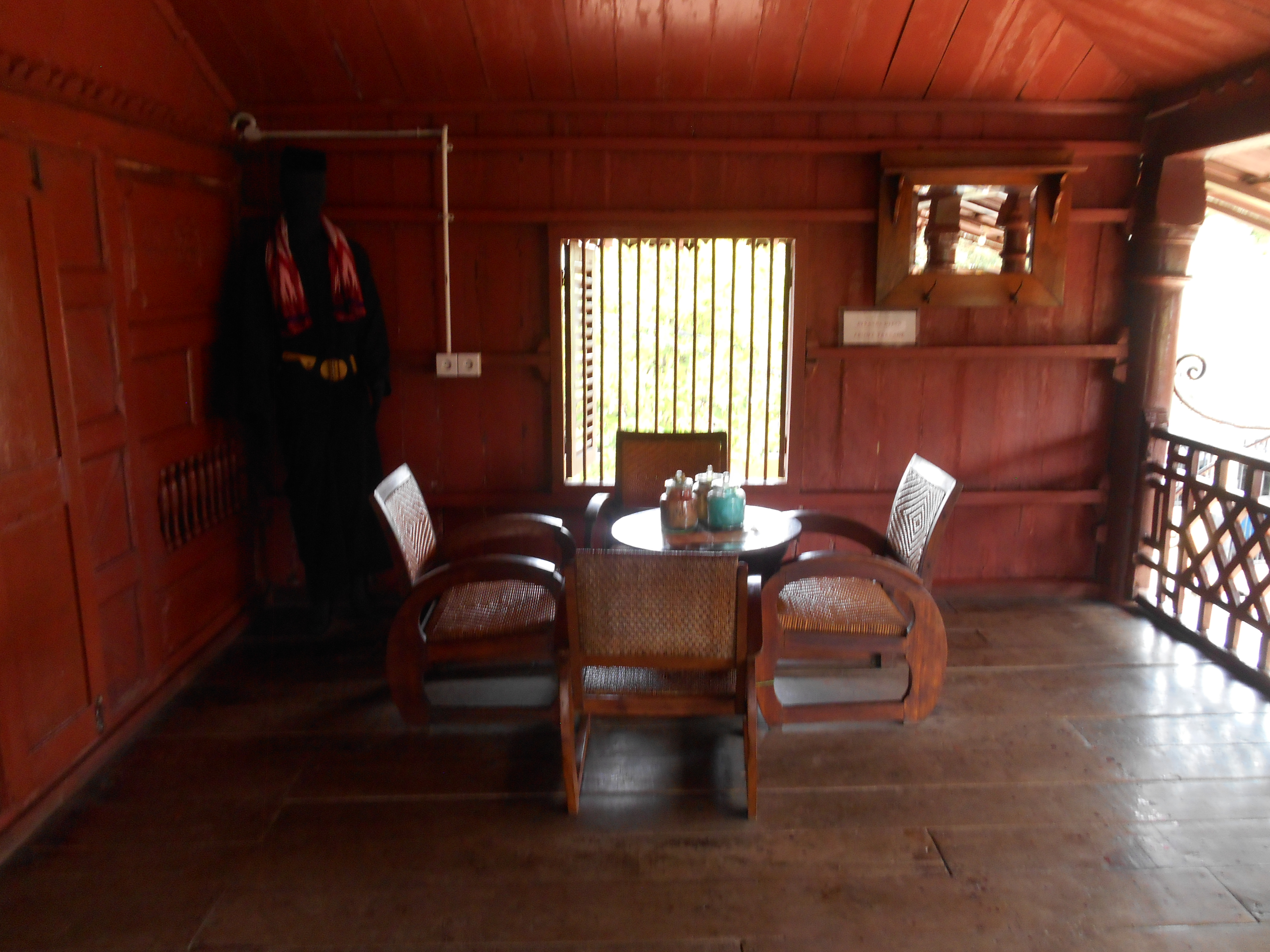
Interior of Rumah Si Pitung in Marunda

In the coastal area in the Marunda area, North Jakarta, the Betawi traditional houses are built in rumah panggung style, which are houses built on stilts. The coastal stilt houses were built according to coastal wet environs which are sometimes flooded by tides or floods, it was possibly influenced by Malay and Bugis traditional houses. Malay and Bugis migrants around Batavia were historically clustered in coastal areas as they worked as traders or fishermen. Today, the cluster of Bugis fishermen villages can be found inhabiting Jakarta's Thousands Islands. An example of a well-preserved Betawi rumah panggung style is Rumah Si Pitung, located in Marunda, Cilincing, North Jakarta.

Betawi houses are typically one of three styles: rumah bapang (or rumah kebaya), rumah gudang (warehouse style), and Javanese-influenced rumah joglo. Most Betawi houses have a gabled roof, except for the joglo house, which has a high-pointed roof. Betawi architecture has a specific ornamentation called gigi balang ("grasshopper teeth") which are a row of wooden shingles applied on the roof fascia. Another distinctive characteristic of the Betawi house is a langkan, a framed open front terrace where the Betawi family receives their guests. The large front terrace is used as an outdoor living space.

=== Music ===
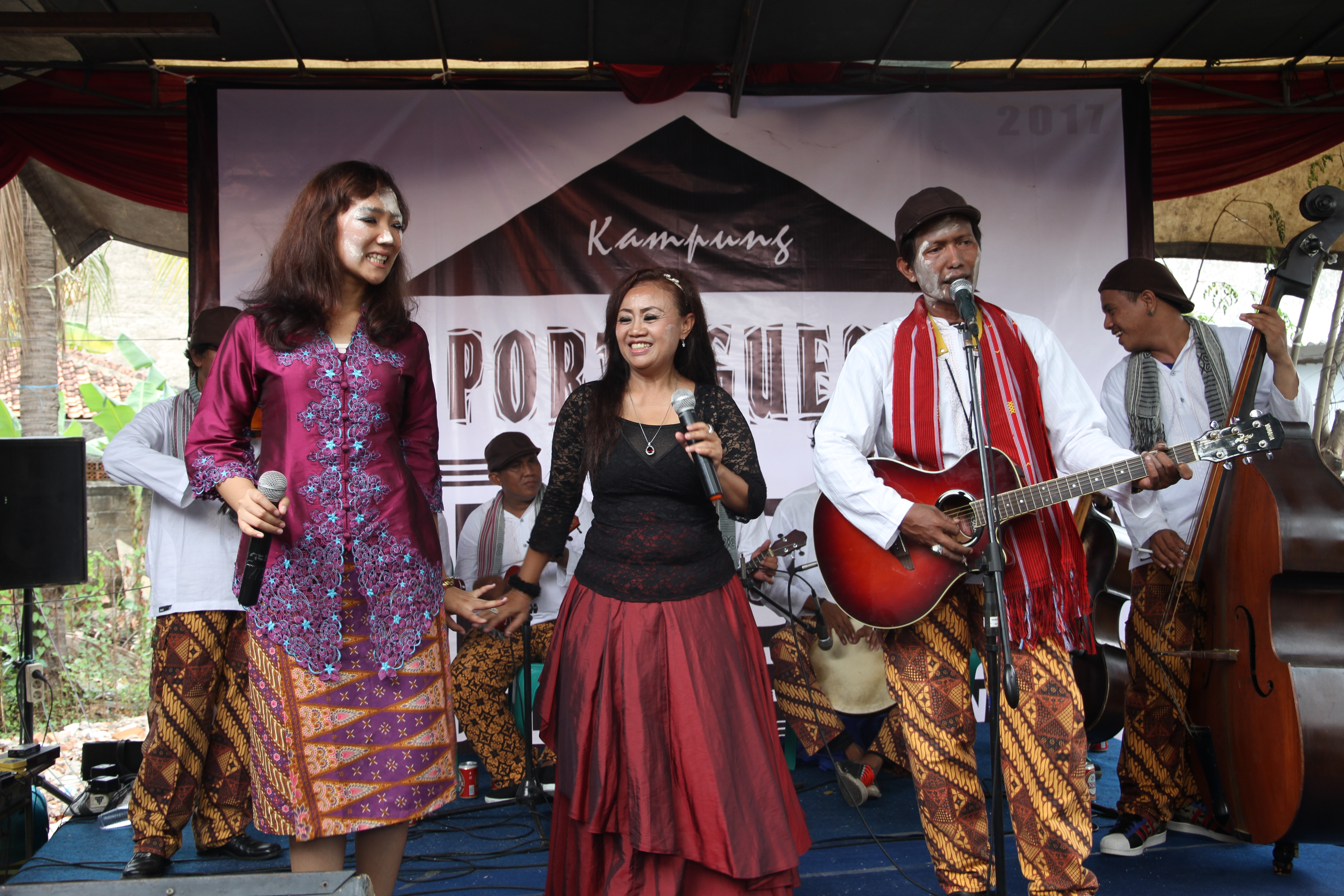
Kroncong Tugu

The Gambang kromong and Tanjidor, as well as Keroncong Kemayoran music, is derived from the kroncong music of Portuguese Mardijker people of the Tugu area, North Jakarta. "Si Jali-jali" is an example of a traditional Betawi song.

=== Dance and drama ===
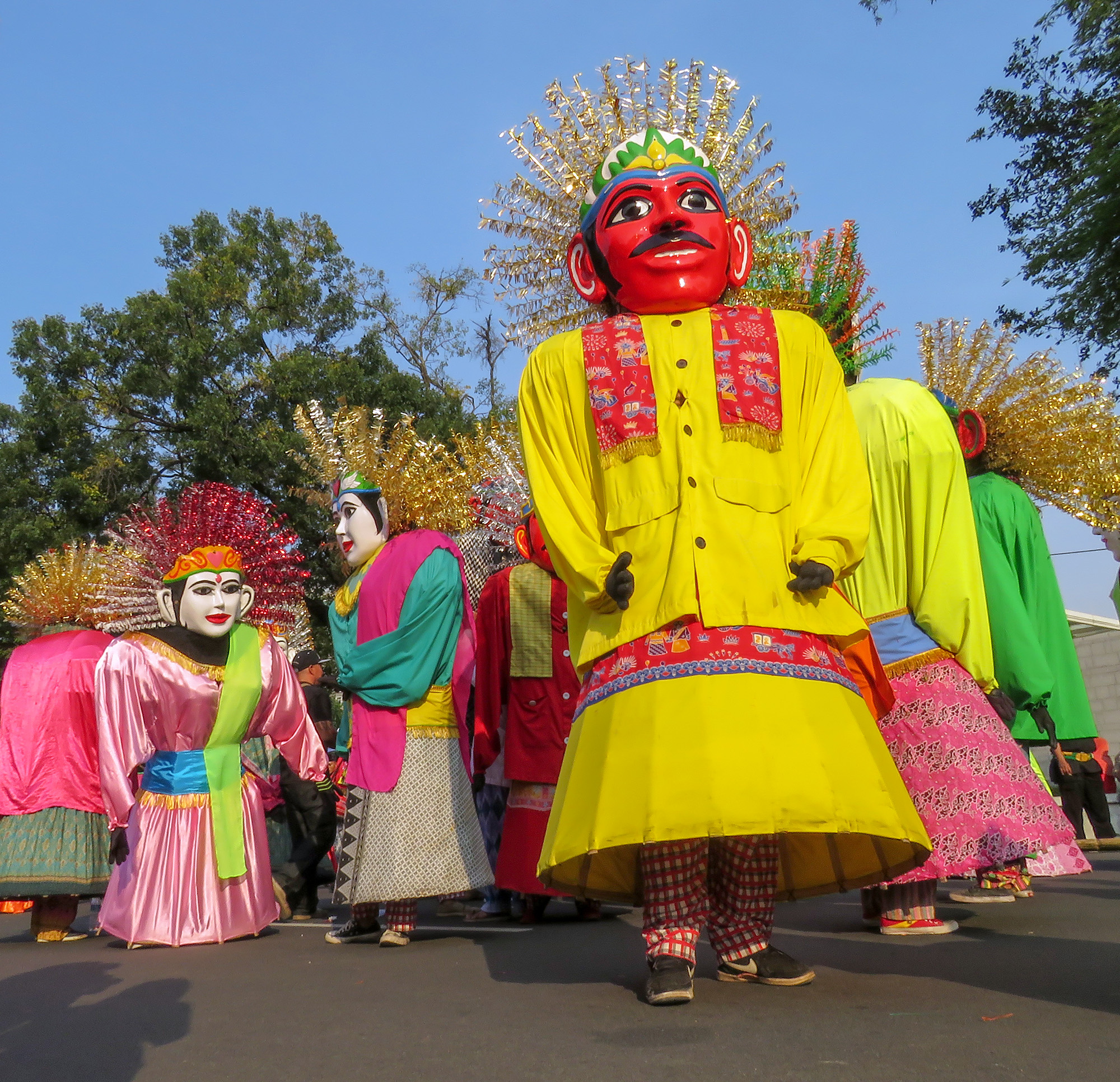
Ondel-ondel Betawi

The Ondel-ondel large bamboo masked-puppet giant effigy is similar to Chinese-Balinese Barong Landung and Sundanese Badawang, the art forms of masked dance. The traditional Betawi dance costumes show both Chinese and European influences, while the movements such as Yapong dance, which is derived from Sundanese Jaipongan dance with a hint of Chinese style. Another dance is Topeng Betawi or Betawi mask dance.

Betawi's popular folk drama is called lenong, which is a form of theater that draws themes from local urban legends, and foreign stories to the everyday life of Betawi people.

=== Ceremonies ===
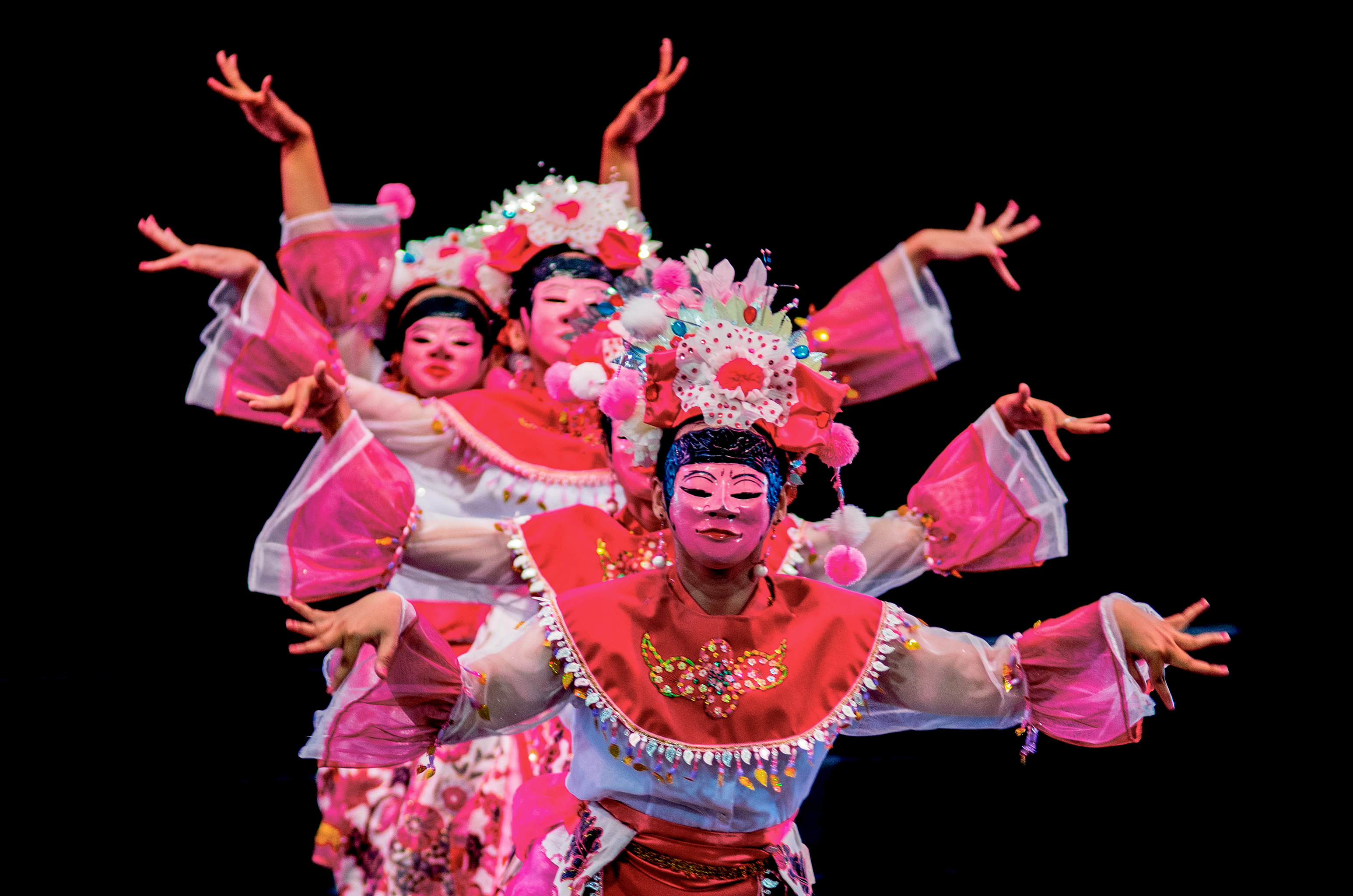
Betawi mask dance (Tari Topeng Betawi)

Mangkeng is a ceremony used at important public gatherings and especially at weddings. The main purpose is to bring good luck and ward off the rain. It is performed by the village shaman, also called the Pangkeng shaman, where the name originates.

During a Betawi wedding ceremony, there is a palang pintu (lit. door's bar) tradition of silat Betawi demonstration. It is a choreographed mock fighting between the groom's entourage with the bride's jagoan kampung (local champion). The fight is naturally won by the groom's entourage as the village champs welcome him to the bride's home. The traditional wedding dress of Betawi displays Chinese influences in the bride's costume and Arabian influences in the groom's costume. Betawi people borrowed the Chinese culture of firecrackers during weddings, circumcisions, or any celebrative events. The tradition of bringing roti buaya (crocodile bread) during a wedding is probably a European custom.

Other Betawi celebrations and ceremonies include sunatan or khitanan (Muslim circumcision), and the Lebaran Betawi festival.

=== Martial arts ===
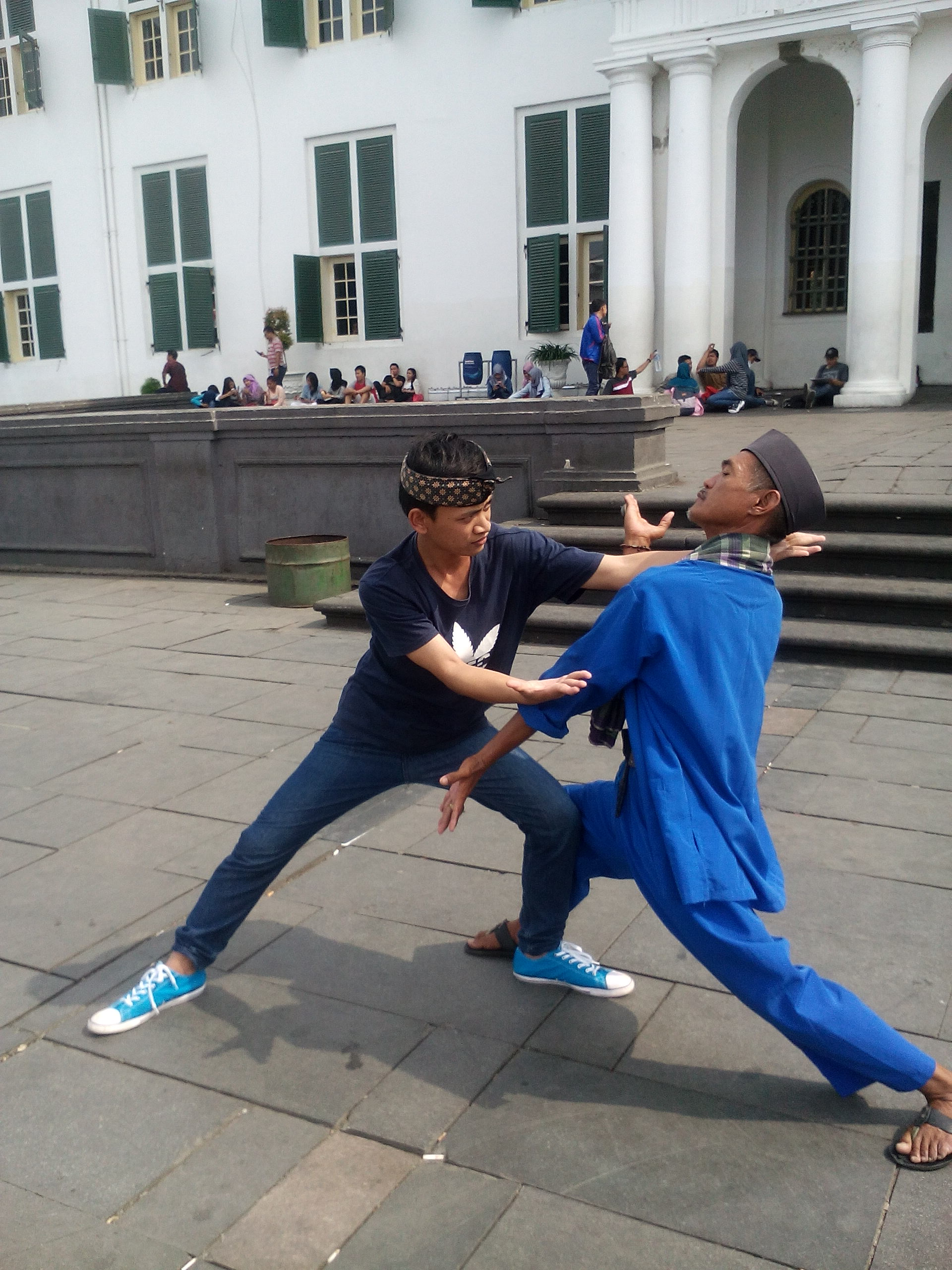
Silat Betawi demonstration in Kota Tua

Silat Betawi is a martial art of the Betawi people, which was not quite popular but recently has gained wider attention thanks to the popularity of Silat films, such as The Raid. Betawi martial art was rooted in the Betawi culture of jagoan (lit. "tough guy" or "local hero") that during colonial times often went against colonial authority; despised by the Dutch as thugs and bandits, but highly respected by locals pribumis as native's champion. In the Betawi dialect, their style of pencak silat is called maen pukulan (lit. playing strike) which is related to Sundanese maen po. Notable schools among others are Beksi and Cingkrik. Beksi is one of the most commonly practised forms of silat in Greater Jakarta and is distinguishable from other Betawi silat styles by its close-distance combat style and lack of offensive leg action.

=== Cuisine ===
Finding its roots in a thriving port city, Betawi has an eclectic cuisine that reflects foreign culinary traditions that have influenced the inhabitants of Jakarta for centuries. Betawi cuisine is heavily influenced by Peranakan, Malay, Sundanese, and Javanese cuisines, and to some extent Indian, Arabic, and European cuisines. Betawi people have several popular dishes, such as soto betawi and soto kaki, nasi uduk, kerak telor, nasi ulam, asinan, ketoprak, rujak, semur jengkol, sayur asem, gabus pucung, and gado-gado Betawi.

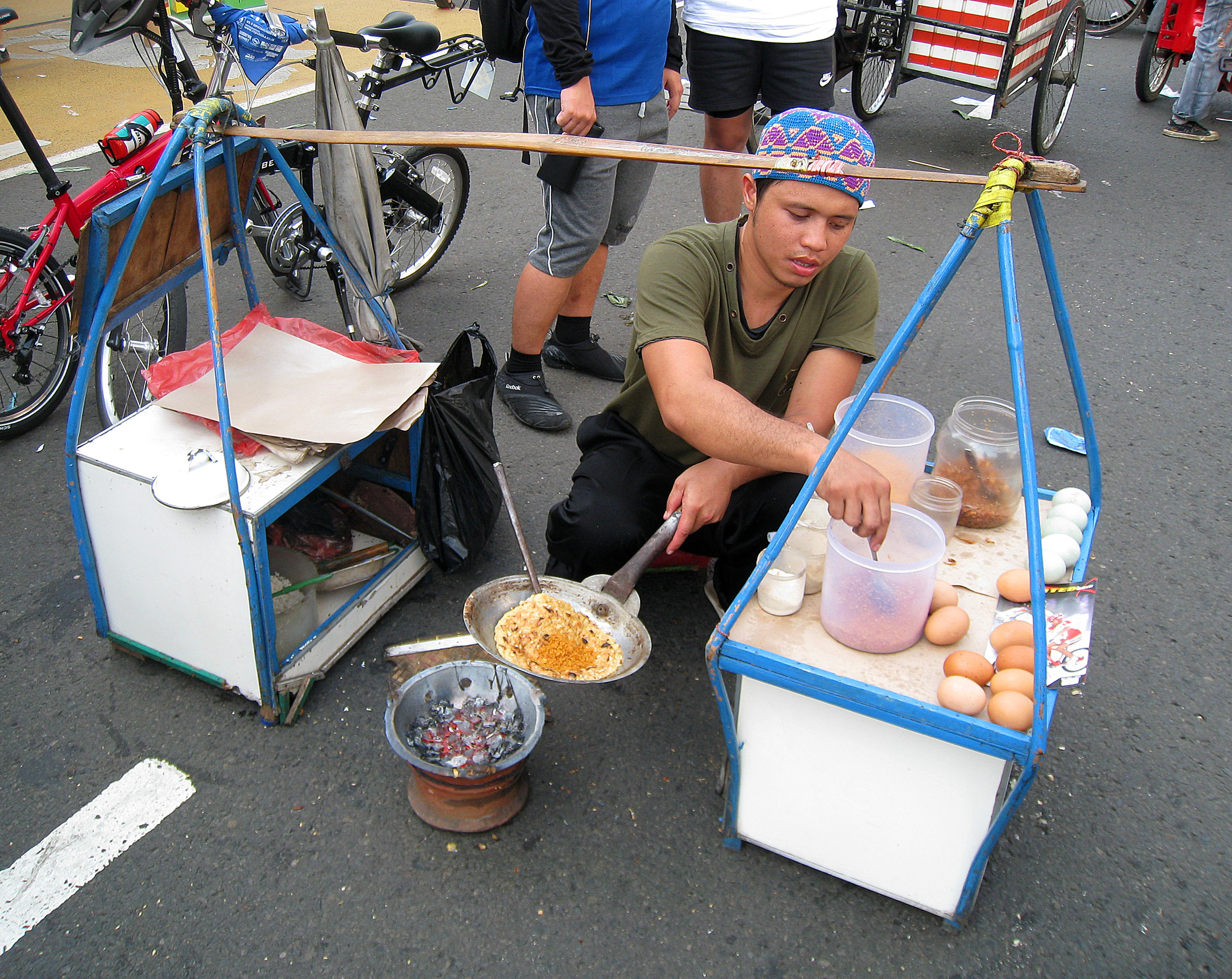
Kerak telor

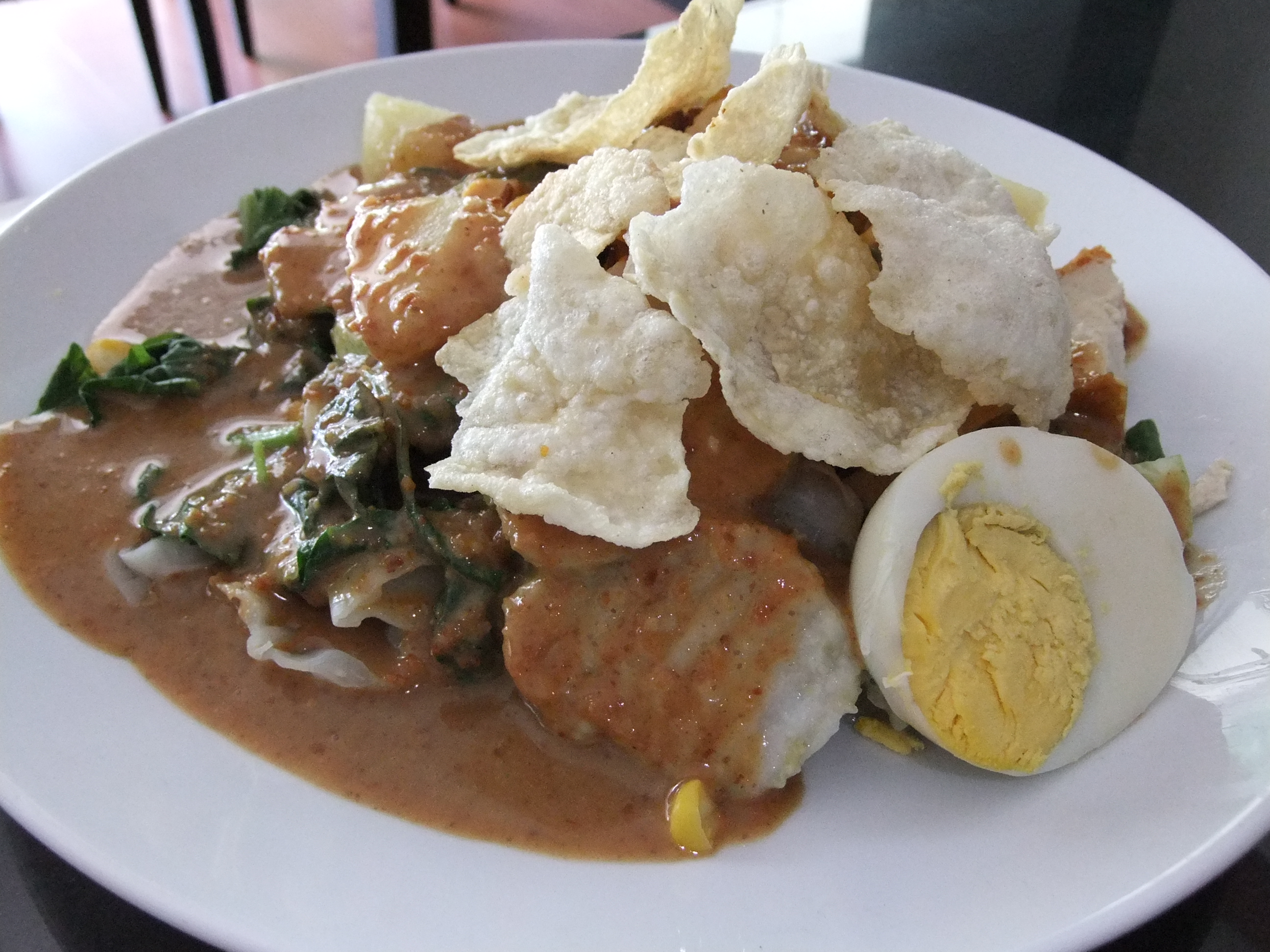
Gado-gado

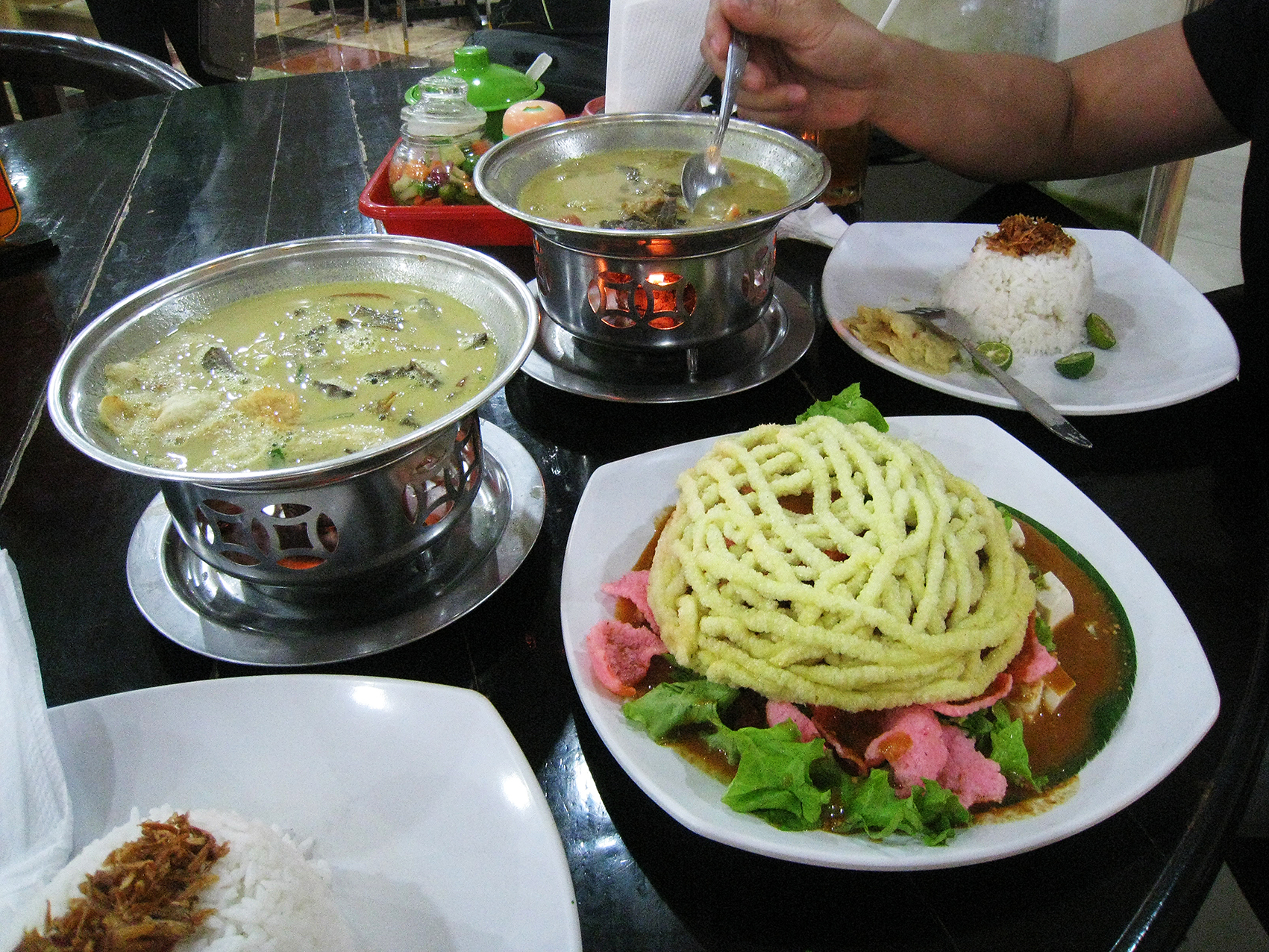
Soto Betawi and Asinan Betawi

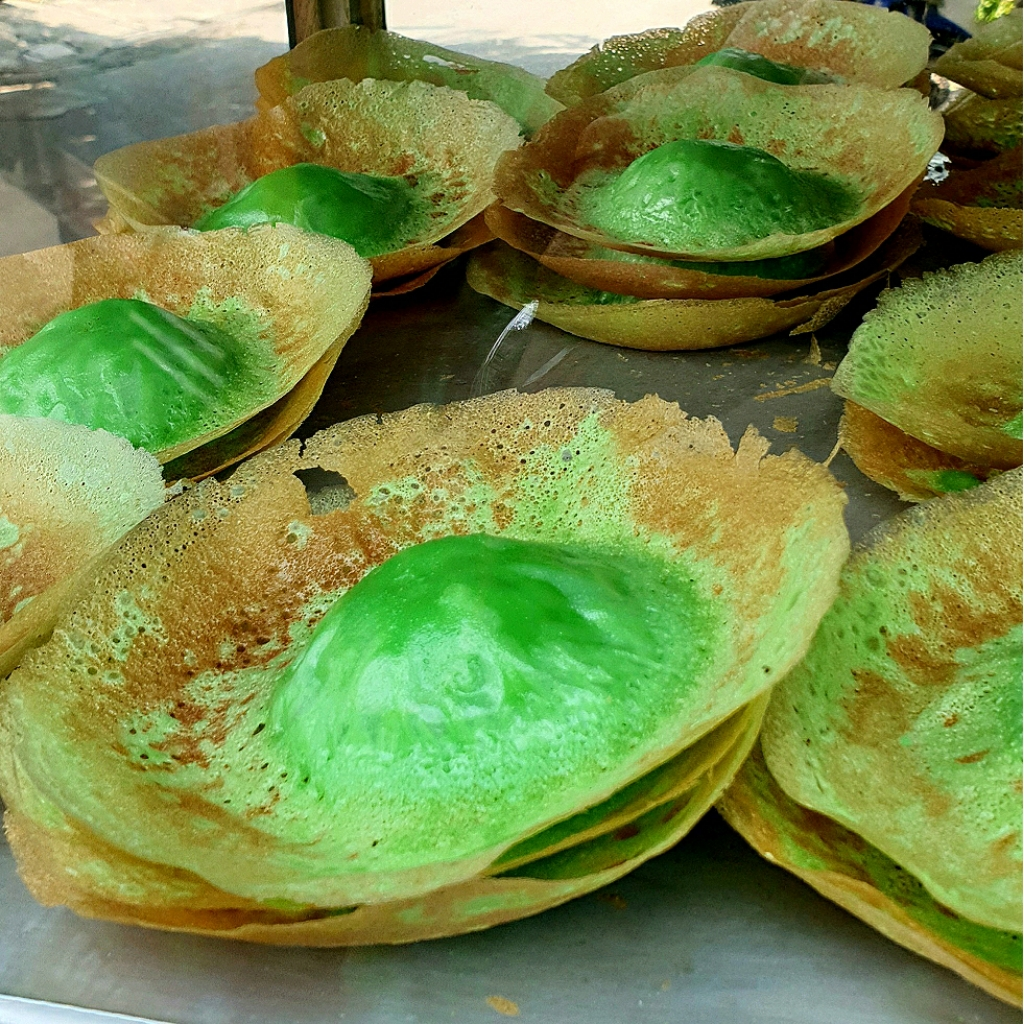
Kue ape or kue tete

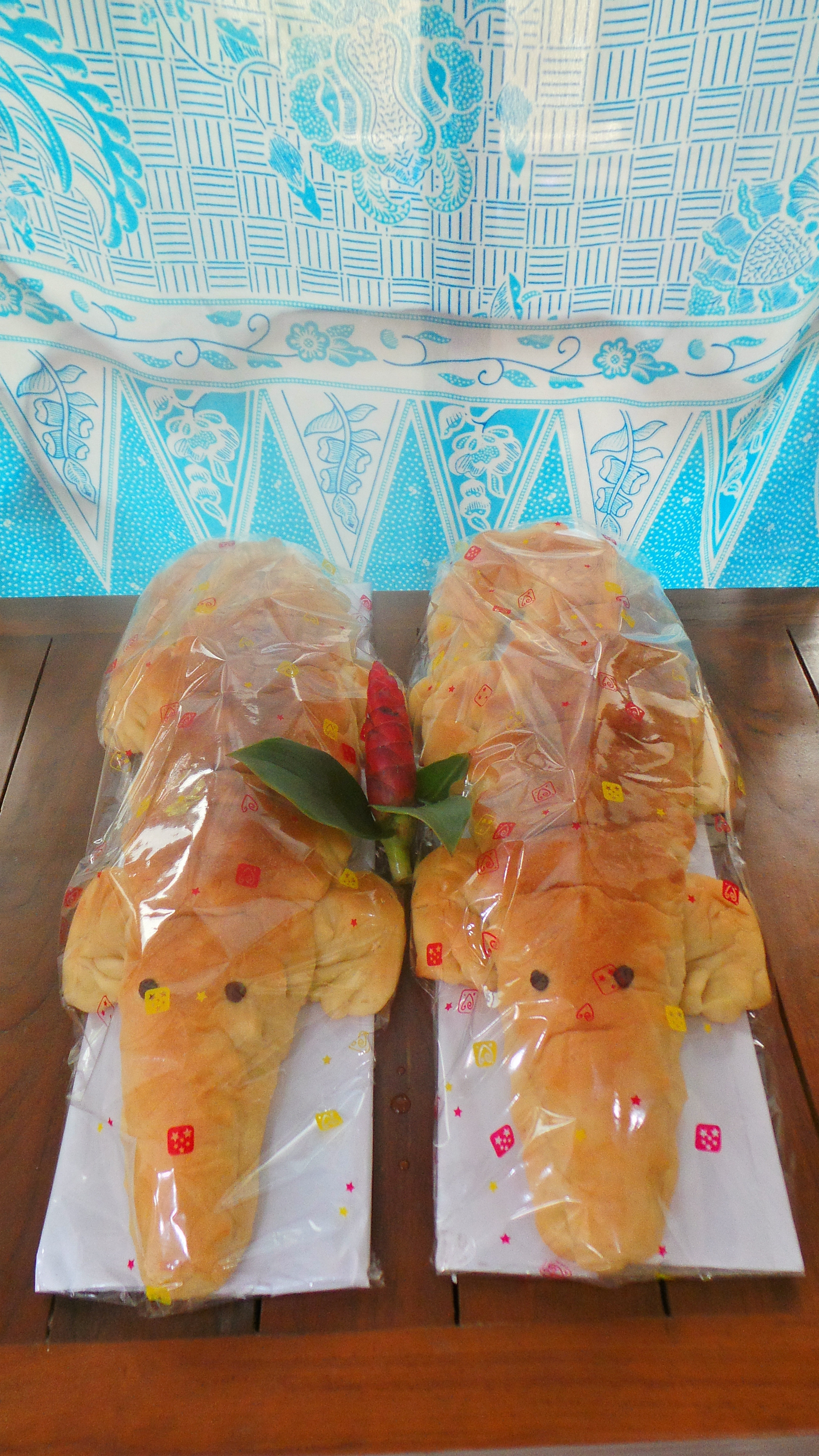
Roti buaya (Crocodile bread)

== Notable people ==
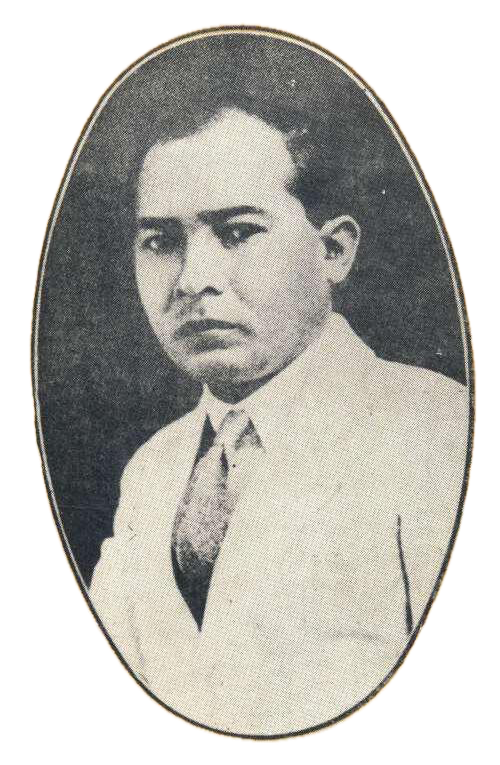
Mohammad Husni Thamrin, acknowledged as a national hero from Jakarta

- Si Pitung, legendary bandit
- Mohammad Husni Thamrin, National Hero of Indonesia
- Benyamin Sueb, legendary comedian, singer and actor
- Imam Syafei, military figure and former special minister of security
- Ismail Marzuki, composer and musician
- Fauzi Bowo, governor of Jakarta 2007–2012
- Zainuddin M. Z., Islamic nationwide preacher and politician
- Suryadharma Ali, politician
- Omaswati, actress
- Mpok Nori, comedian
- Julia Perez, actress and singer
- Surya Saputra, actor, singer and model
- Iko Uwais, actor, martial artist and stuntman
- Ayu Ting Ting, singer
- Aiman Witjaksono, journalist and news anchor
- Asmirandah Zantman, actress and singer
- Francesca Gabriella Dewi Rezer, actress, presenter and model

== See also ==
- Batavia (now Jakarta)
- Benteng Chinese
- Cocos Malays
- Mardijker people

== Bibliography ==
- Castles, Lance The Ethnic Profile of Jakarta, Indonesia vol. I, Ithaca: Cornell University April 1967
- Guinness, Patrick The attitudes and values of Betawi Fringe Dwellers in Djakarta, Berita Antropologi 8 (September), 1972, pp. 78–159
- Knoerr, Jacqueline Im Spannungsfeld von Traditionalität und Modernität: Die Orang Betawi und Betawi-ness in Jakarta, Zeitschrift für Ethnologie 128 (2), 2002, pp. 203–221
- Knoerr, Jacqueline Kreolität und postkoloniale Gesellschaft. Integration und Differenzierung in Jakarta, Frankfurt & New York: Campus Verlag, 2007
- Saidi, Ridwan. Profil Orang Betawi: Asal Muasal, Kebudayaan, dan Adat Istiadatnya
- Shahab, Yasmine (ed.), Betawi dalam Perspektif Kontemporer: Perkembangan, Potensi, dan Tantangannya, Jakarta: LKB, 1997
- Wijaya, Hussein (ed.), Seni Budaya Betawi. Pralokarya Penggalian Dan Pengem¬bangannya, Jakarta: PT Dunia Pustaka Jaya, 1976
