= John Emigh =

American academic

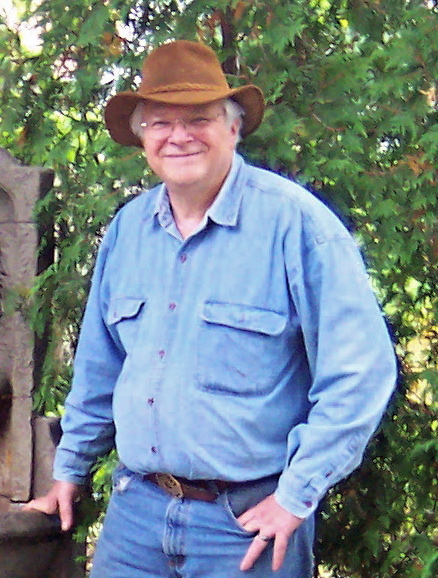
Emigh in 2007

John Emigh (born 3 September 1941) is professor emeritus from the Departments of Theatre, Speech and Dance and of English at Brown University, Providence, Rhode Island. Emigh taught at Brown from 1967 to 2009. Since his retirement, he has mainly been teaching and directing in the Brown/Trinity Rep MFA program.

== Biography ==
John Emigh was born in Hartford, Connecticut and grew up in Connecticut. In his New Britain high school, he was a saxophonist in the school band, treasurer of numerous clubs, and planned on going to law school with the goal of going into politics. He entered Amherst College, became interested in theater arts, and took a year off to travel to Spain and Morocco to study and translate plays by Federico García Lorca. He received his BA from Amherst in English and Dramatic Arts in 1964 and went on to graduate school at Tulane University in New Orleans. Tulane awarded him an MFA in Theatre (Directing) in 1967, and a PhD (Theatre: Theory and Criticism) in 1971.

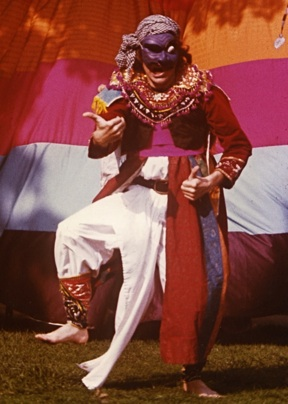
John Emigh in one-man topeng performance.

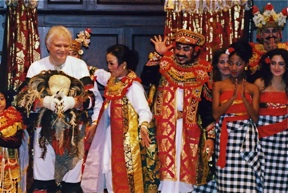
John Emigh (left) after group topeng performance.

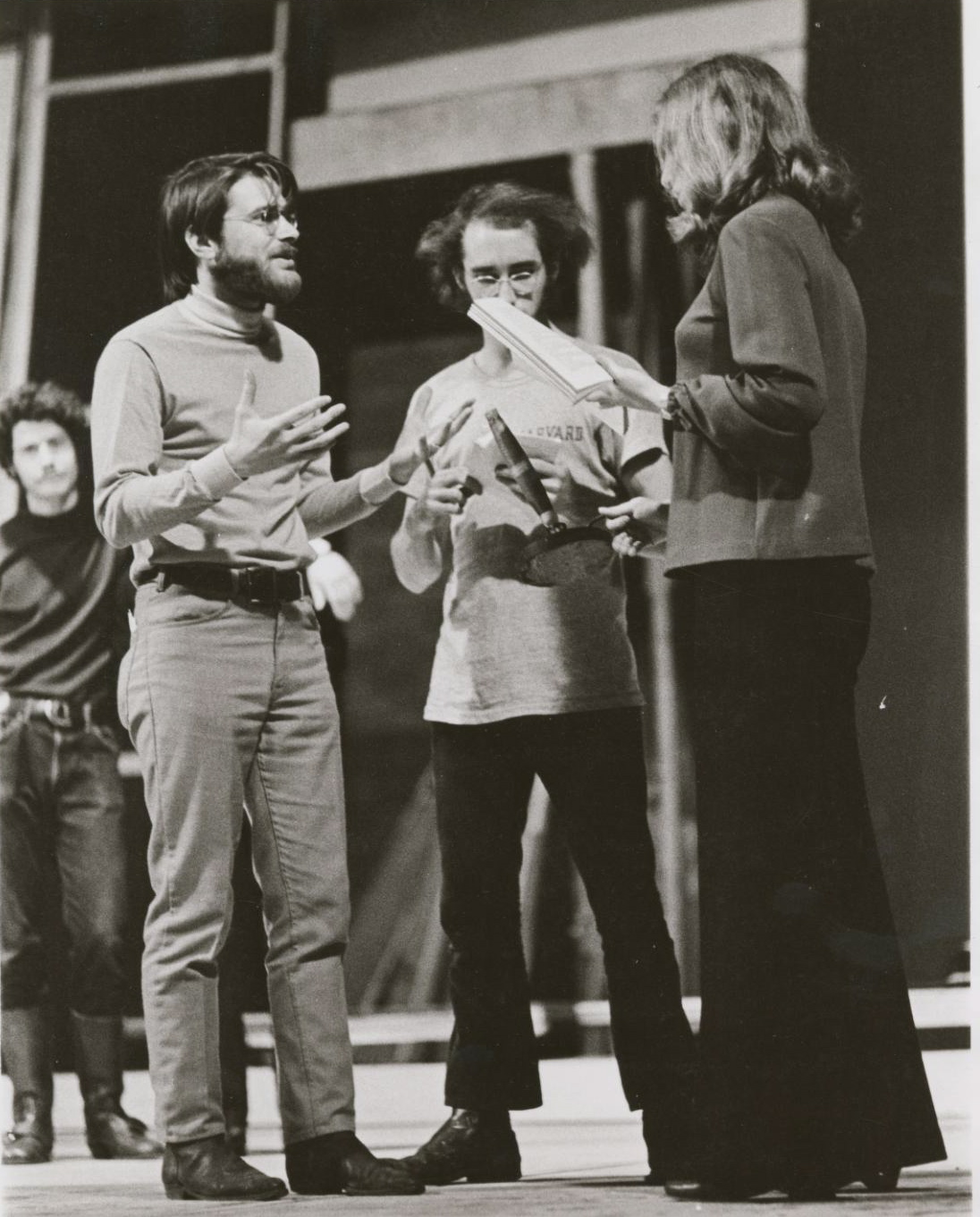
John Emigh directing "him" by E. E. Cummings in 1969.

Emigh is a director, performer, and acting teacher who has directed more than 70 plays in universities and in professional theatre, and has written extensively on the masked theatre and rituals of New Guinea, Bali, and India, as well as on Western theatrical practices. In 1974–75, he traveled in New Guinea, South Asia, and Indonesia, where he studied Balinese "topeng" masked dance with I Nyoman Kakul. Since then, he has made several more research trips to Asia, investigating the street jesters and court fools of Rajasthan, the use of masks in Eastern India, and the changing dynamics of performance in Bali.

His 1985 documentary film, Hajari Bhand of Rajasthan: Jester without a Court, has been shown at the National Museum of Natural History in Washington, DC. Emigh also compiled an interactive database of the permanent collection of masks at the Indira Gandhi National Centre for the Arts in New Delhi. His book Masked Performance: The Play of Self and Other in Ritual and Theatre combines years of ethnographic research with the insights of a practicing actor and director to describe and theorize the use of masks in both Asian and Western contexts.

Emigh has published contributions or articles in Cambridge Companion to Performance Studies; Cambridge Guide to Theatre; Oxford Encyclopedia of Theatre and Performance; South Asian Folklore: An Encyclopedia; Teaching Performance Studies; Re-Playing Shakespeare in Asia; The Idea of Rajasthan: Explorations in Regional Identity; Gender in Performance: The Presentation of Difference in the Performing Arts; Art and Politics in Southeast Asia, Six Perspectives: Papers from the Distinguished Scholars Series; Popular Theatre: A Sourcebook; Masks: Faces of Culture, published by the St. Louis Art Museum; Teaching Performance Studies; SHAW: The Annual of Bernard Shaw Studies; Seagull Theatre Magazine; Faces; The Drama Review; Communications; Asian Theatre Journal; World of Music.

His recent projects include an essay on the killings in Bali in 1965 as reflected in the Balinese performing arts, an article theorizing about Samuel Colt as the inspiration for George Bernard Shaw's Undershaft, and a report on a Balinese adaptation of Macbeth in the style of the gambuh theater. He is also investigating the links between the traditional concerns of the theater and recent research in neuroscience, as well as studying mask performance and traditions in Mexico, Austria, Germany, and Italy.

As a performer, Emigh has acted with leading Balinese artists and has performed one-man shows and lecture-demonstrations based on Balinese mask techniques at schools, hospitals, universities, theatres, and festivals throughout the United States and in Bali and India, including the Performing Garage in New York City, The New Theatre Festival of Baltimore, the Indian National School for Drama, the Tibetan School of Drama, and the Balinese Academy for the Arts. Substantive articles about Emigh's theatrical work have appeared in TDR: The Drama Review and Asian Theatre Journal, as well as in various Asian journals.

He was the founding chairperson of the Association for Asian Performance and served as chair of Brown University's Department of Theatre, Speech and Dance from 1987 to 1993. In 1971, he conceived and co-ordinated the RI Festival of New Theatre (the first festival to bring together the work of America's leading avant-garde groups of that period). In 2005, Emigh was artistic director for Performance Studies International's Providence, RI conference and festival: "Becoming Uncomfortable". He served on the steering committees for the founding of the Association for Theatre in Higher Education and of Performance Studies International, and he currently serves on PSi's executive board.

== Family ==
Emigh is married to Ulrike Emigh and the father of Eric E. Emigh, and he is the father of Aaron Emigh and Rebecca Emigh from a previous marriage.

== Links ==
- Profile, brown.edu; accessed 28 January 2019.
- Interview of John Emigh, 2020.
- Masks of Eastern India, four-part documentary by John & Ulrike Emigh.
