= Rumah adat =

Traditional Indonesian houses

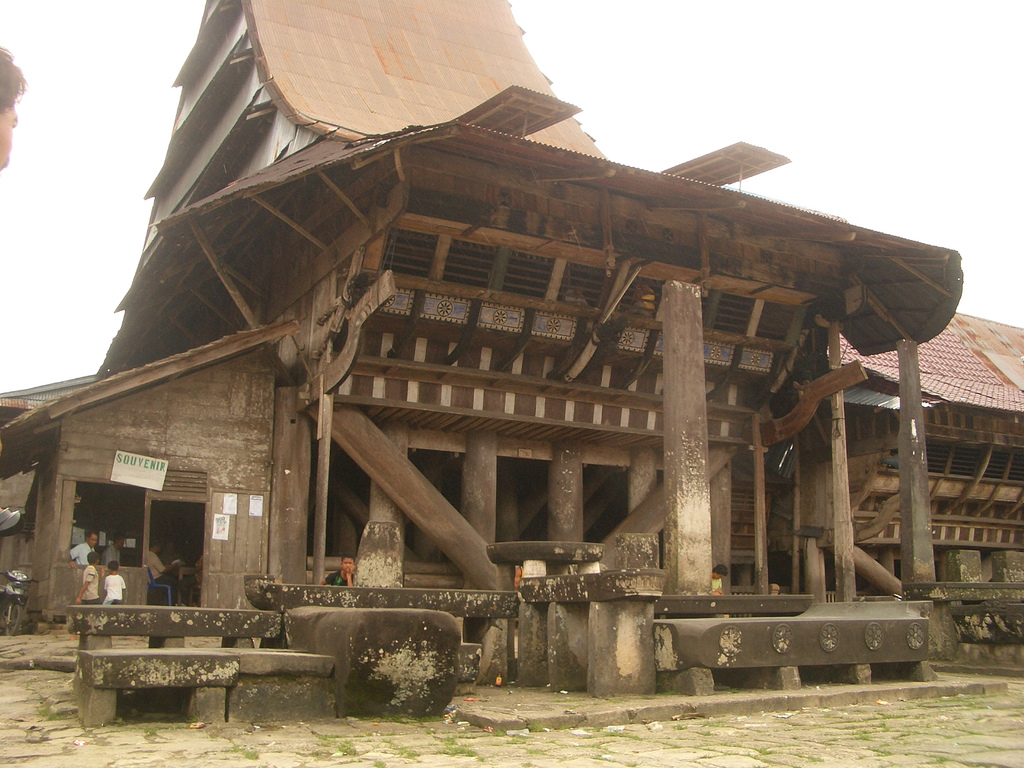
Traditional house in Nias; its post, beam and lintel construction with flexible nail-less joints, and non-load bearing walls are typical of rumah adat

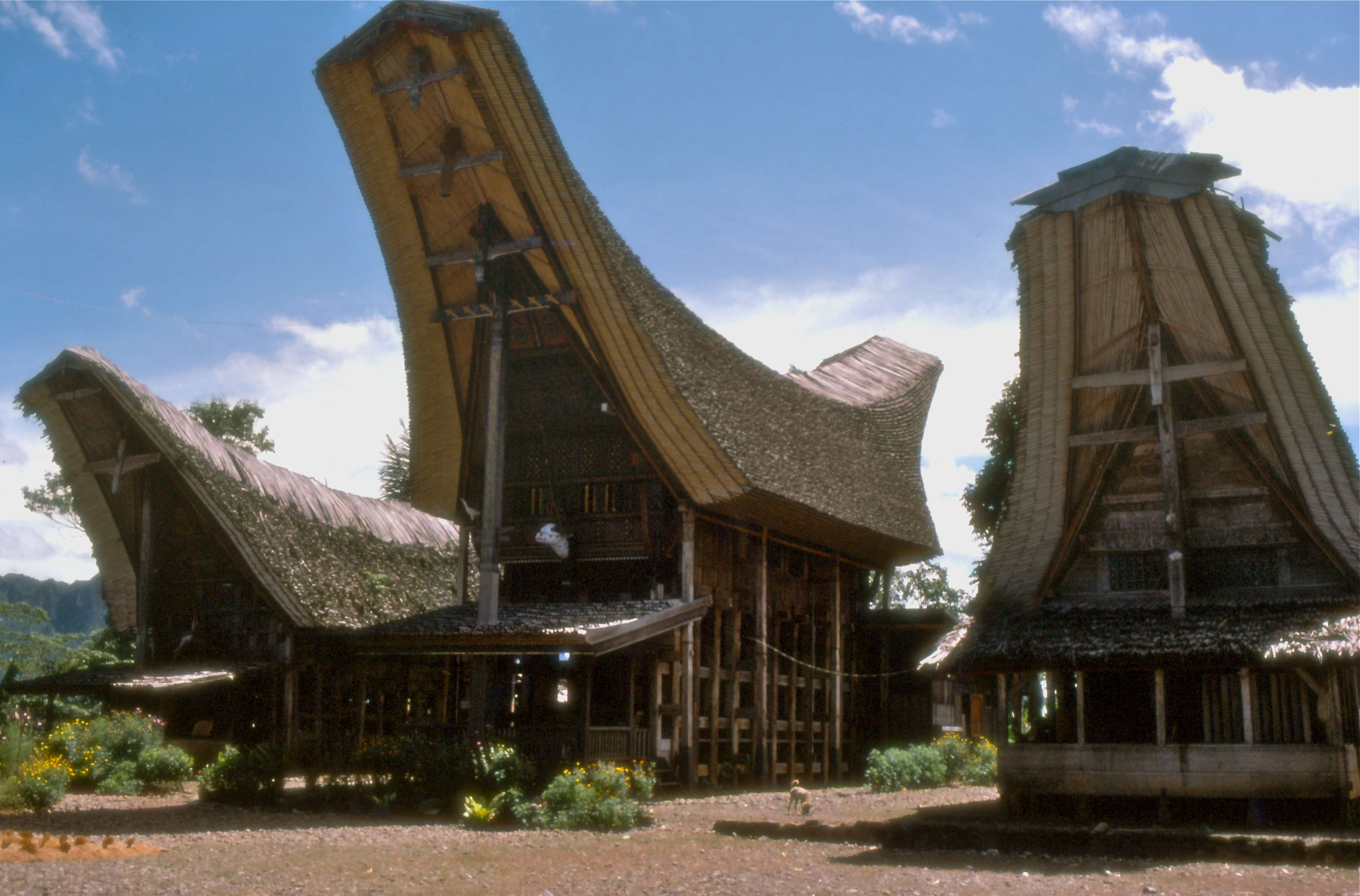
Houses in a Torajan village

Rumah adat are traditional houses built in any of the vernacular architecture styles of Indonesia, collectively belonging to the Austronesian architecture. The traditional houses and settlements of the several hundreds ethnic groups of Indonesia are extremely varied and all have their own specific history. It is the Indonesian variants of the whole Austronesian architecture found all over places where Austronesian people inhabited from the Pacific to Madagascar each having their own history, culture and style.

Ethnic groups in Indonesia are often associated with their own distinctive architectural form of traditional housing. The houses are at the centre of a web of customs, social relations, traditional laws, taboos, myths and religions that bind the villagers together. The house provides the main focus for the family and its community, and is the point of departure for many activities of its residents. Villagers build their own homes, or a community pools its resources for a structure built under the direction of a master builder or carpenter.

The vast majority of Indonesians no longer live in rumah adat, and the numbers have declined rapidly due to economic, technological, and social changes.

== General form ==
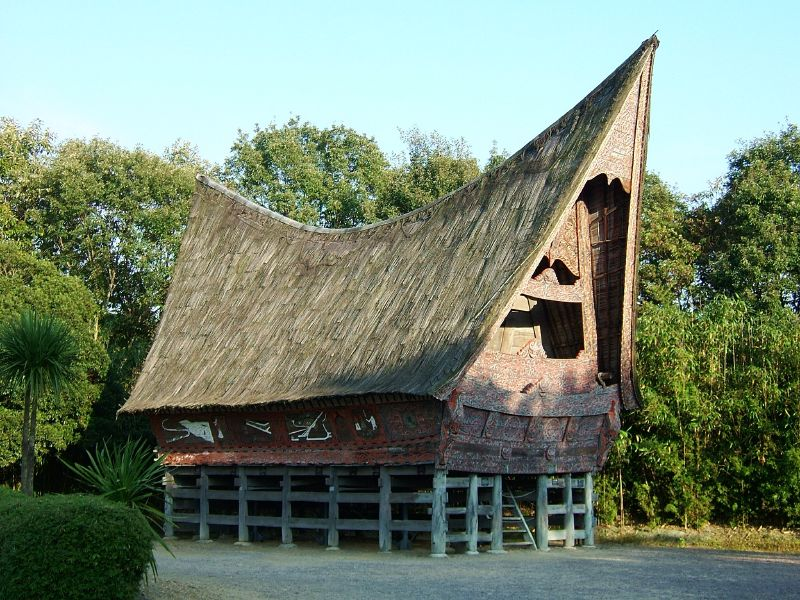
A traditional Batak Toba house in North Sumatra

With few exceptions, the peoples of the Indonesian archipelago share a common Austronesian ancestry (originating in Taiwan, c. 6,000 years ago) or Sundaland, a sunken area in Southeast Asia, and the traditional homes of Indonesia share a number of characteristics, such as timber construction and varied and elaborate roof structures. The earliest Austronesian structures were communal longhouses on stilts, with steep sloping roofs and heavy gables, as seen in the Batak rumah adat and the Torajan Tongkonan. Variations on the communal longhouse principle are found among the Dayak people of Borneo, as well as the Mentawai people.

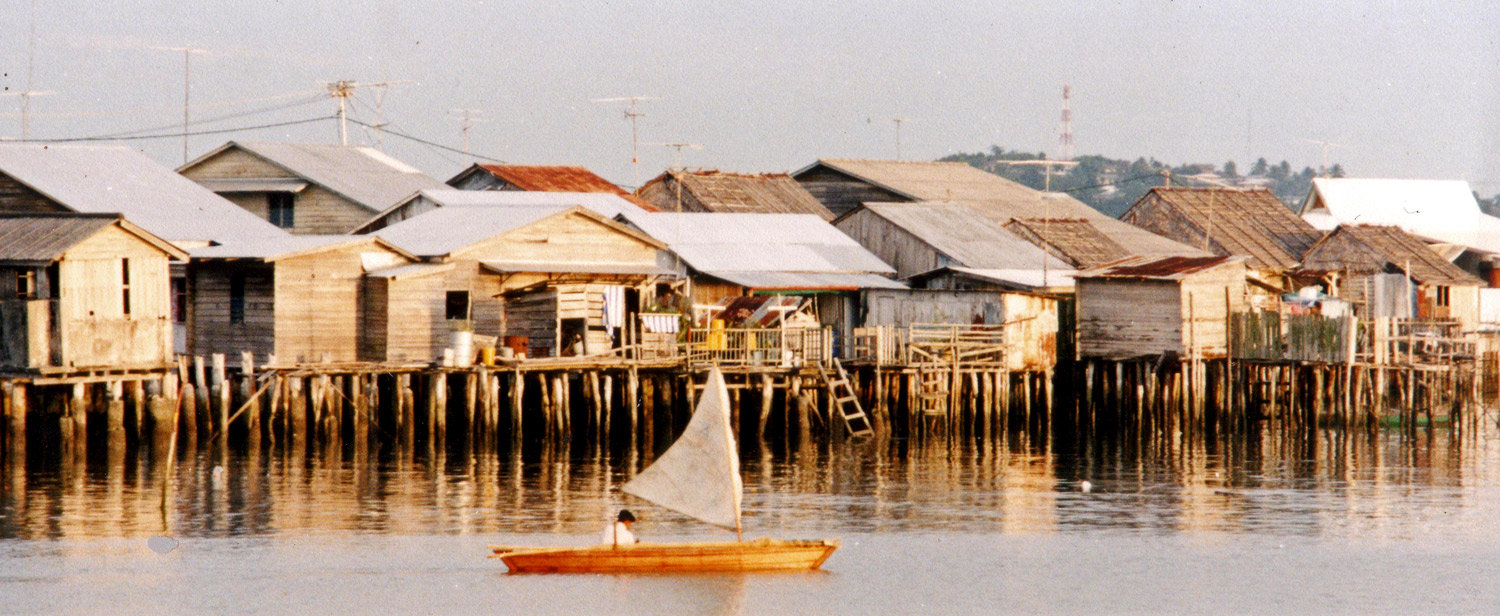
A fishing village of pile houses in the Riau archipelago

The norm is for a post, beam and lintel structural system that take load straight to the ground with either wooden or bamboo walls that are non-load bearing. Traditionally, rather than nails, mortis and tenon joints and wooden pegs are used. Natural materials - timber, bamboo, thatch and fibre - make up rumah adat. Hardwood is generally used for piles and a combination of soft and hard wood is used for the house's upper non-load bearing walls, and are often made of lighter wood or thatch. The thatch material can be coconut and sugar palm leaves, alang alang grass and rice straw.

Traditional dwellings have developed to respond to natural environmental conditions, particularly Indonesia's hot and wet monsoon climate. As is common throughout Southeast Asia and the Southwest Pacific, most rumah adat are built on stilts, with the exception of Java, Bali, and other houses of Eastern Indonesia. Building houses off the ground on stilts serve a number of purposes: it allows breezes to moderate the hot tropical temperatures; it elevates the dwelling above stormwater runoff and mud; it allows houses to be built on rivers and wetland margins; it keeps people, goods and food from dampness and moisture; lifts living quarters above malaria-carrying mosquitos; and reduces the risk of dry rot and termites. The sharply inclined roof allows the heavy tropical rain to quickly sheet off, and large overhanging eaves keep water out of the house and provide shade in the heat. In hot and humid low-lying coastal regions, homes can have many windows providing good cross-ventilation, whereas in cooler mountainous interior areas, homes often have a vast roof and few windows.

== Examples ==
Examples of rumah adat include:

- Rumoh Aceh, is the largest and tallest type of traditional houses of Acehnese people. It has a wooden gabled roof, decorated with wood carvings of floral or geometric patterns on the exterior.
- Batak architecture (North Sumatra) includes the boat-shaped jabu homes of the Toba Batak people, with dominating carved gables and dramatic oversized roofs, and are based on an ancient model. Meanwhile, the Karo Batak house has a high roof, in the form of a combination of a gable or two gables crossed over a hip roof. Other Batak groups also have their own style of traditional housing.
- The Minangkabau of West Sumatra build the rumah gadang, distinctive for their multiple gables with dramatically upsweeping ridge ends.
- The homes of Nias peoples include the omo sebua chiefs' houses built on massive ironwood pillars with towering roofs. Not only are they almost impregnable to attack in former tribal warfare, but flexible nail-less construction provides proven earthquake durability.
- Uma longhouse is the traditional communal house of Mentawai on the Siberut island of Mentawai Islands, with a rectangular shape and a verandah at each end.
- Rumah Melayu Malay traditional houses built on stilts of Sumatra, Borneo and Malay Peninsula. There are many styles of Malay houses; for example curved roof houses from the east coast of North Sumatra and Kampar (Riau), gabled roof houses with crossing edges forming "x" pinnacles on corners of the roof from Riau and Jambi, pyramidal styled pitched roof with a stepped floor from South Sumatra and multiple-level hip-roofed house from West Kalimantan.
- Nuwo Balak of Lampung, which means big house, has a roof whose ends are centred on a central point and is made of round logs arranged parallel and copper-plated. This house is used as the residence of the tribal chiefs.
- Rumah Kebaya is one of Betawi traditional house. The main characteristic of this house is its wide terrace, which may serve to receive a visitor and as a place for relaxing.
- Sundanese imah usually take basic form of gabled roof called kampung style roof, made of thatched materials (ijuk black aren fibres or hateup leaves) with weaved bamboo wall and structure built on short stilts. The more elaborate overhanging gabled roof is called julang ngapak.
- Unlike most South East Asian vernacular homes, Javanese omah are not built on piles, and have become the Indonesian vernacular style most influenced by European architectural elements.
- Tanean Lanjhang, which means a long yard, is a traditional Madurese house which is a collection of houses consisting of several families who are still in one family bond.
- Traditional Balinese homes are a collection of individual, largely open structures (including separate structures for the kitchen, sleeping areas, bathing areas and shrine) within a high-walled garden compound.
- Dayak people traditionally live in communal longhouses that are built on piles. The houses can exceed 300 m in length, in some cases forming a whole village. While baluk roundhouse of Bidayuh Dayak is built on very high stilts with an iconic conical roof.
- The Bubungan Tinggi, with their steeply pitched roofs, are the large homes of Banjarese royalty and aristocrats in South Kalimantan.
- The Sasak people of Lombok build lumbung, pile-built bonnet-roofed rice barns, that are often more distinctive and elaborate than their houses (see Sasak architecture).
- Dalam Loka of Sumbawa is the former residence of the sultan of Sumbawa with an elongated twin stilt house shape and two levels of gabled roofs.
- Bugis-Makassar saoraja or balla houses are stilt houses, with gabled roofs and have a distinctive gable cover called timpalaja with a certain number of arrangements as a symbol of the social status of the homeowner.
- Malige of Buton has a similar appearance to the Bugis-Makassar house but with a two-tier level of the gable roof.
- The Toraja of the Sulawesi highlands are renowned for their tongkonan, houses built on piles and dwarfed by massive exaggerated-pitch saddle roofs.
- Walewangko is the residence of the Minahasan traditional elders. It has two stairs, located on the left and right of the front of the house.
- People of Flores are known for their traditional house that has a trapezoidal roof. This house is called sa'o by the Ngada people or mosalaki by the Ende-Li'o people.
- Lopo of Alor has a pyramid-shaped roof and is supported by several pillars made of wood.
- Uma Kalada of Sumba have distinctive thatched "high hat" roofs and are wrapped with sheltered verandahs.
- Ume Le'u from Timor is a traditional house belonging to the Atoni people. It consists of two buildings, namely lopo and ume kbubu. Lopo has a conical roof without walls, while ume kbubu has a rounded shape, has no windows, and only has one door. Meanwhile, the tribal chiefs live in the conical-roofed sonaf house.
- Dani people of Highland Papua traditionally live in small family compounds composed of several circular huts known as honai with thatched dome roofs.
- The Tobati and Sentani people are known for their cone-shaped houses called kariwari or khombo which are built around the shores of Lake Sentani.
- Rumsram house of the Biak Numfor people is square in shape with an overturned boat-shaped roof.
- Mimika people of Central Papua people have a traditional house called karapao, which has many doors and mats made of forest pandanus.
- Asmat people of South Papua have a stilt house called jew which is rectangular in shape and functions as a gathering place for men who are not married or who are still single.
Rumah Adat

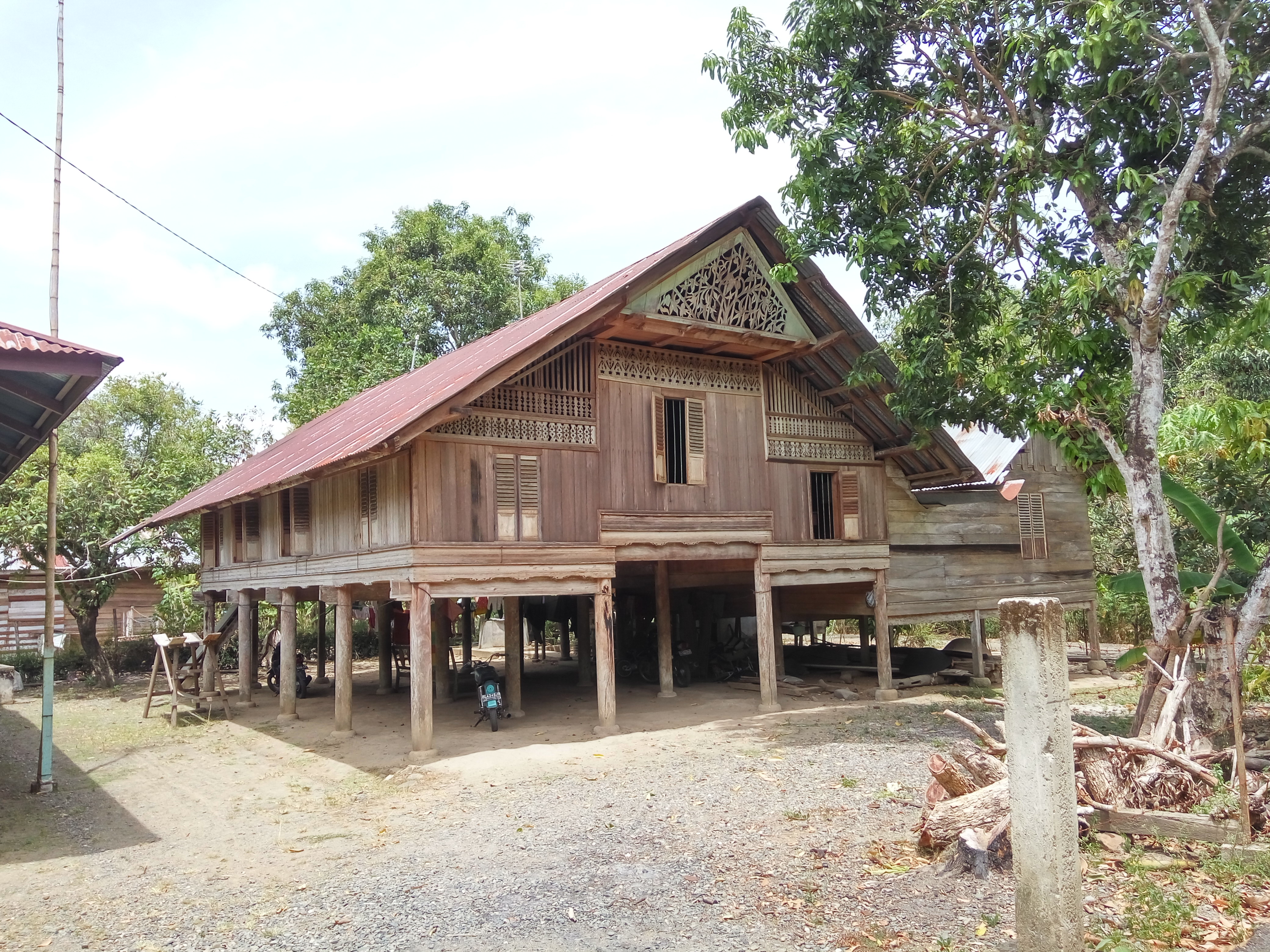
Traditional house of Aceh

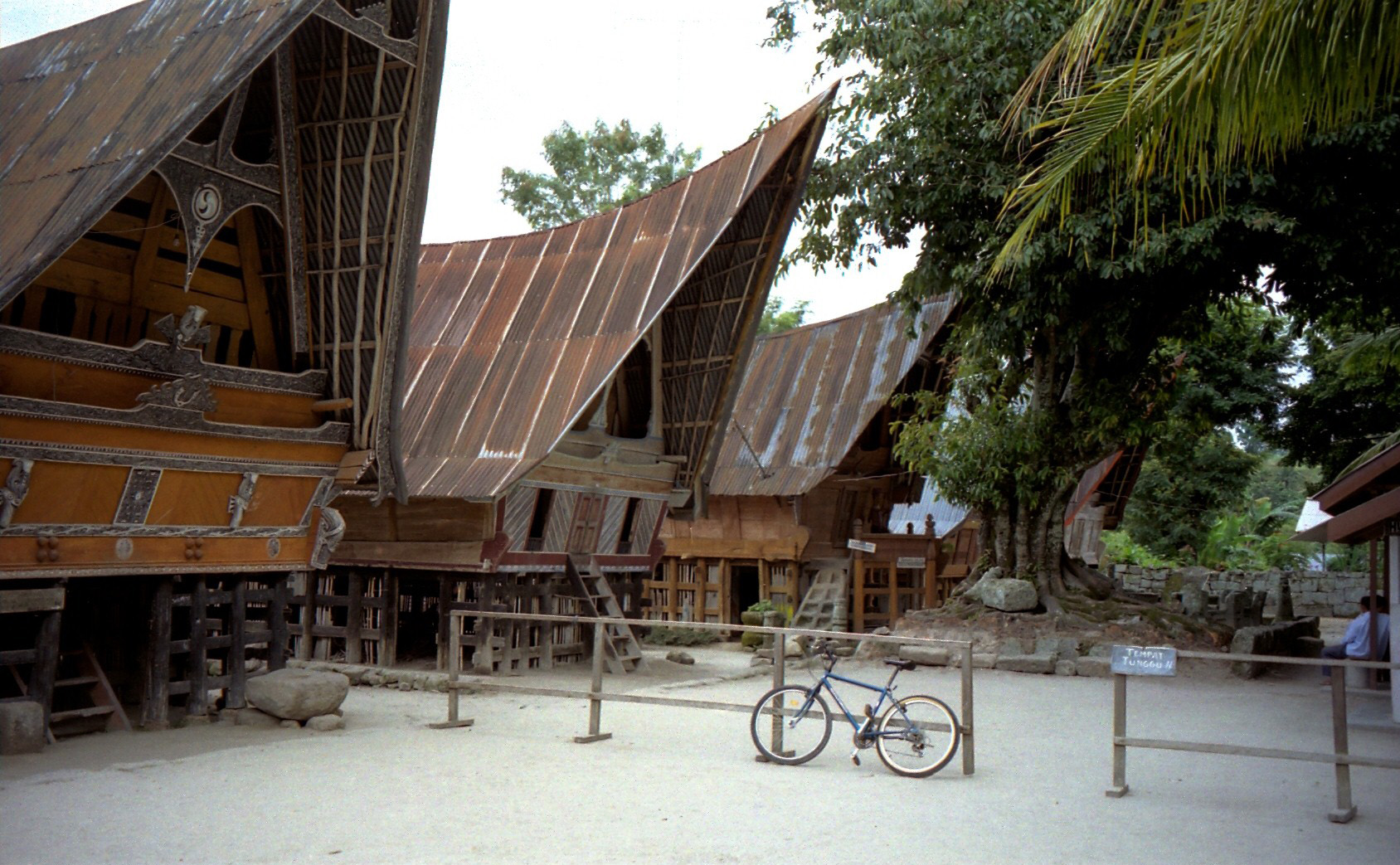
A traditional Batak Toba house, North Sumatra

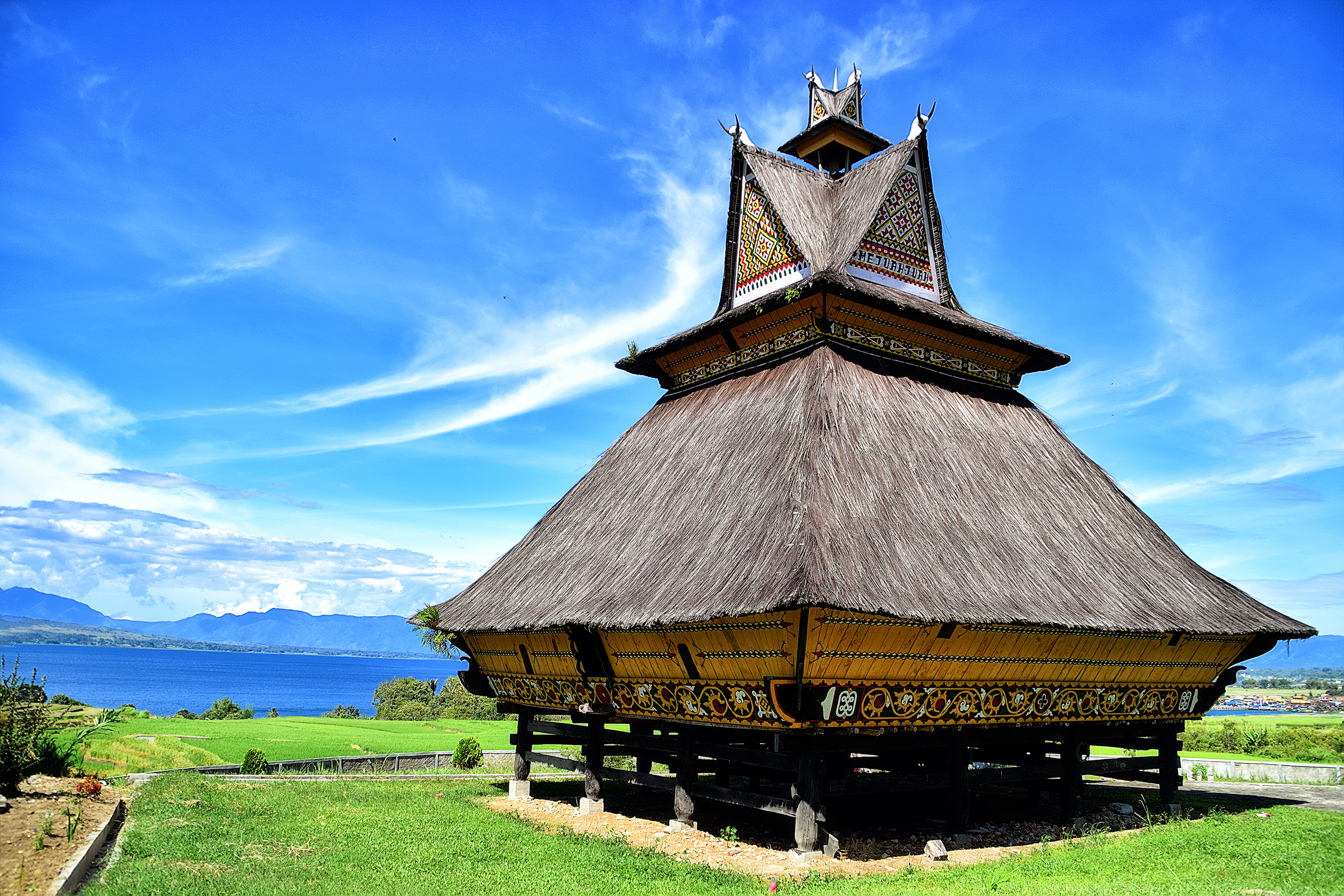
Karo house, North Sumatra

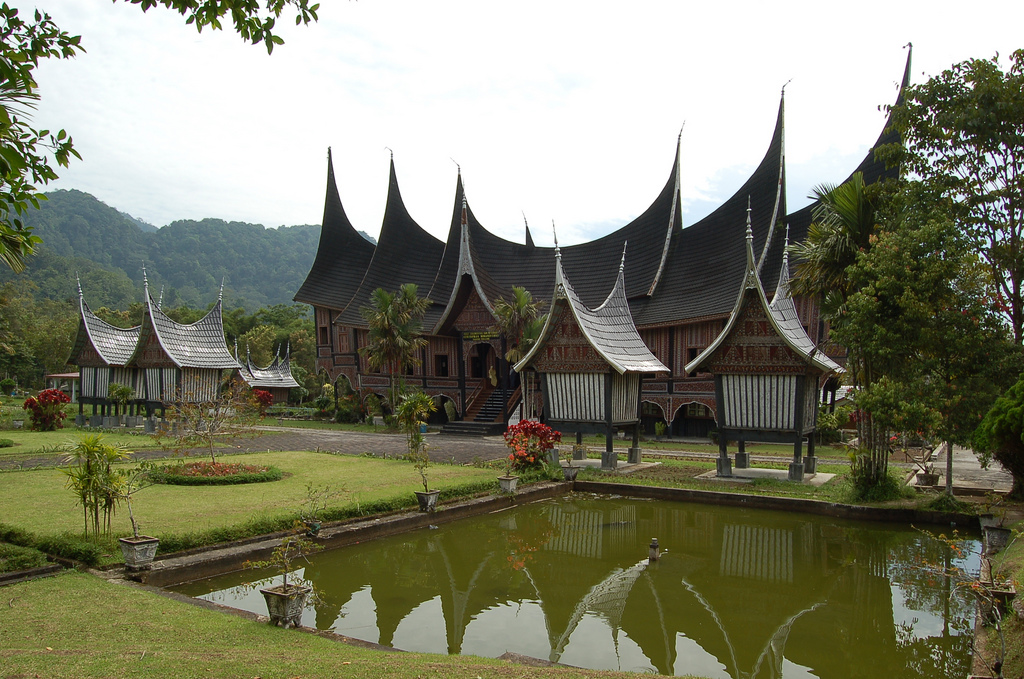
Rumah Gadang, West Sumatra

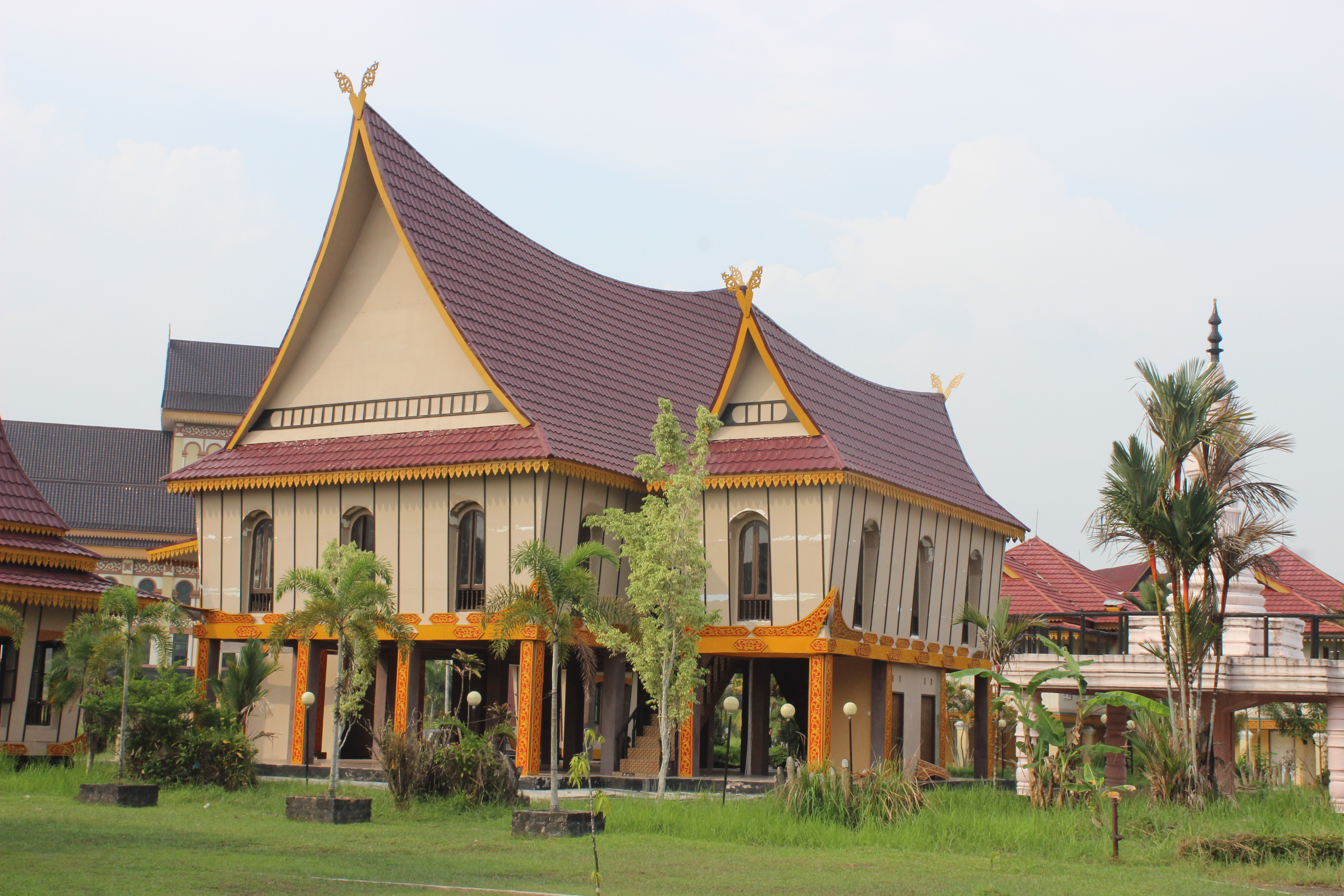
Bangkinang Malay house, Riau

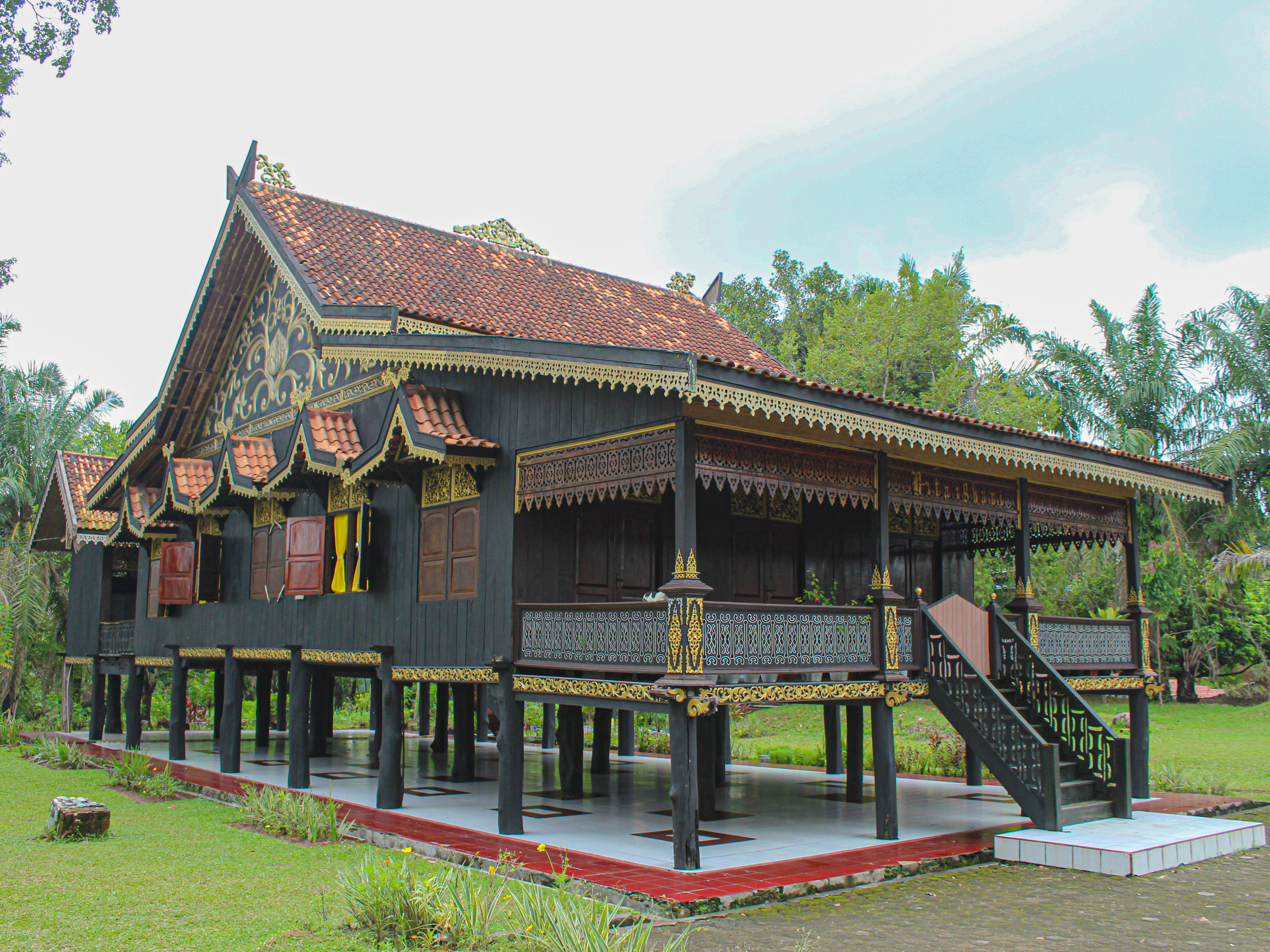
Kajang Leko house, Jambi

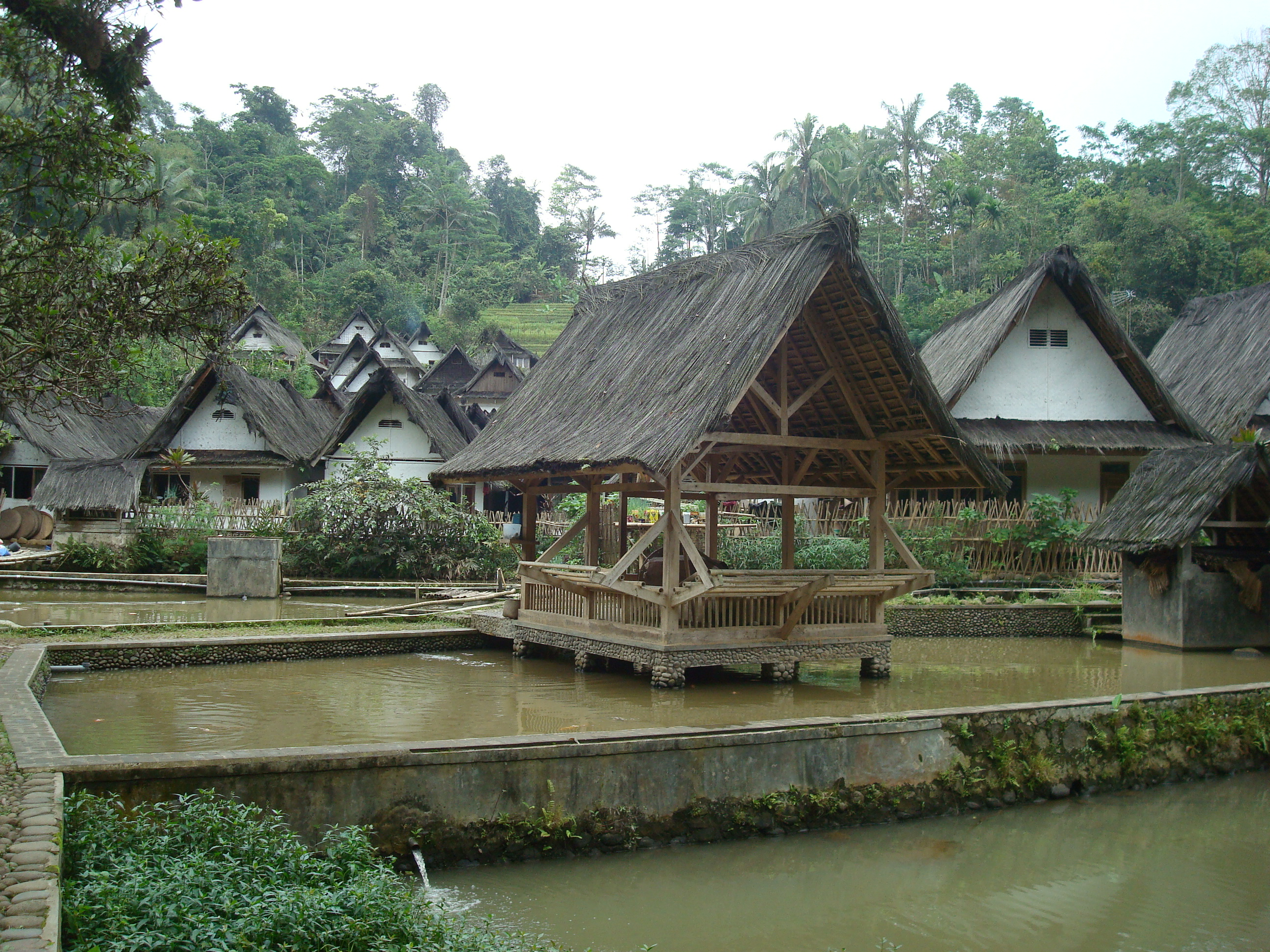
Sundanese Kampung Naga house, West Java

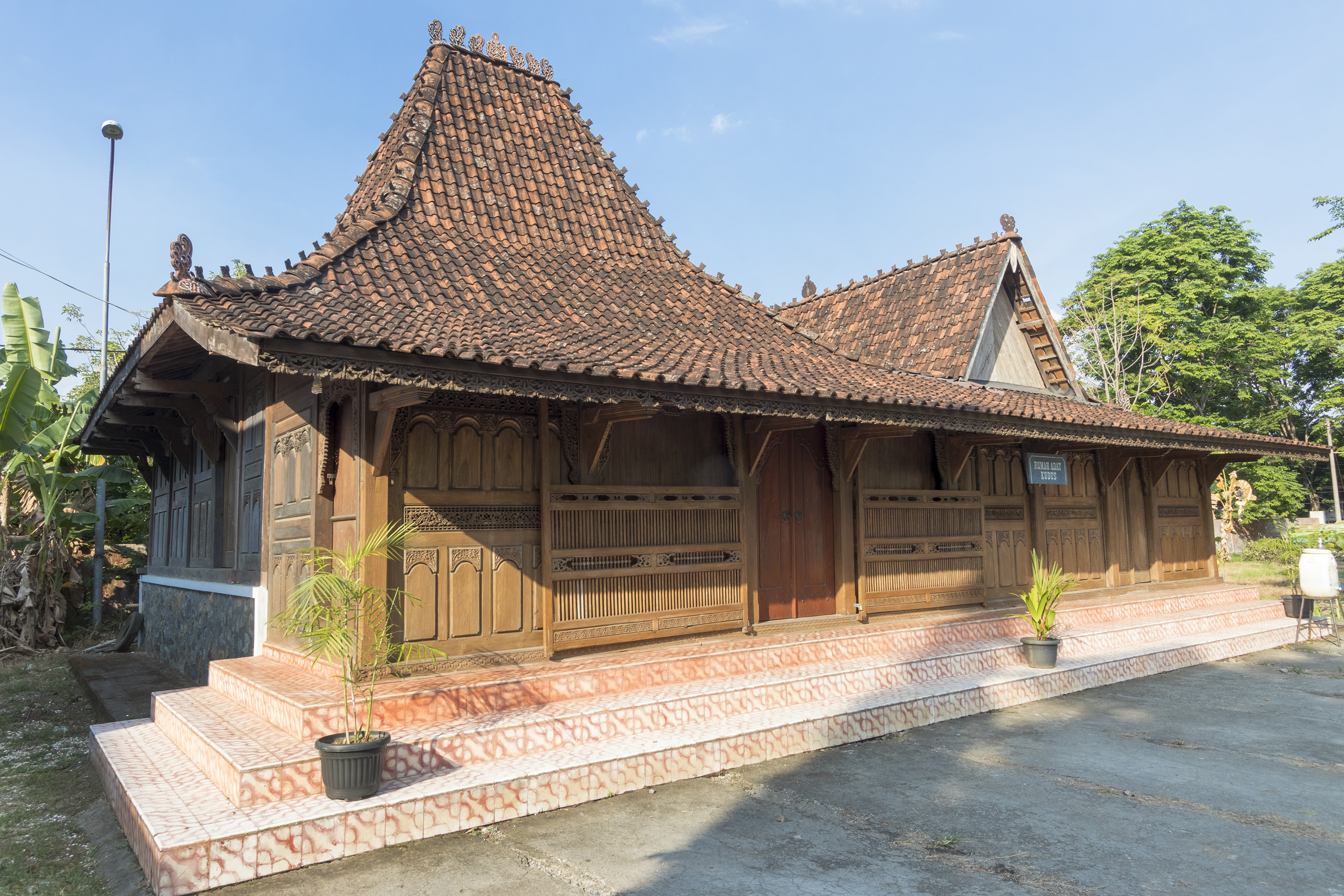
Joglo Javanese house, Central Java

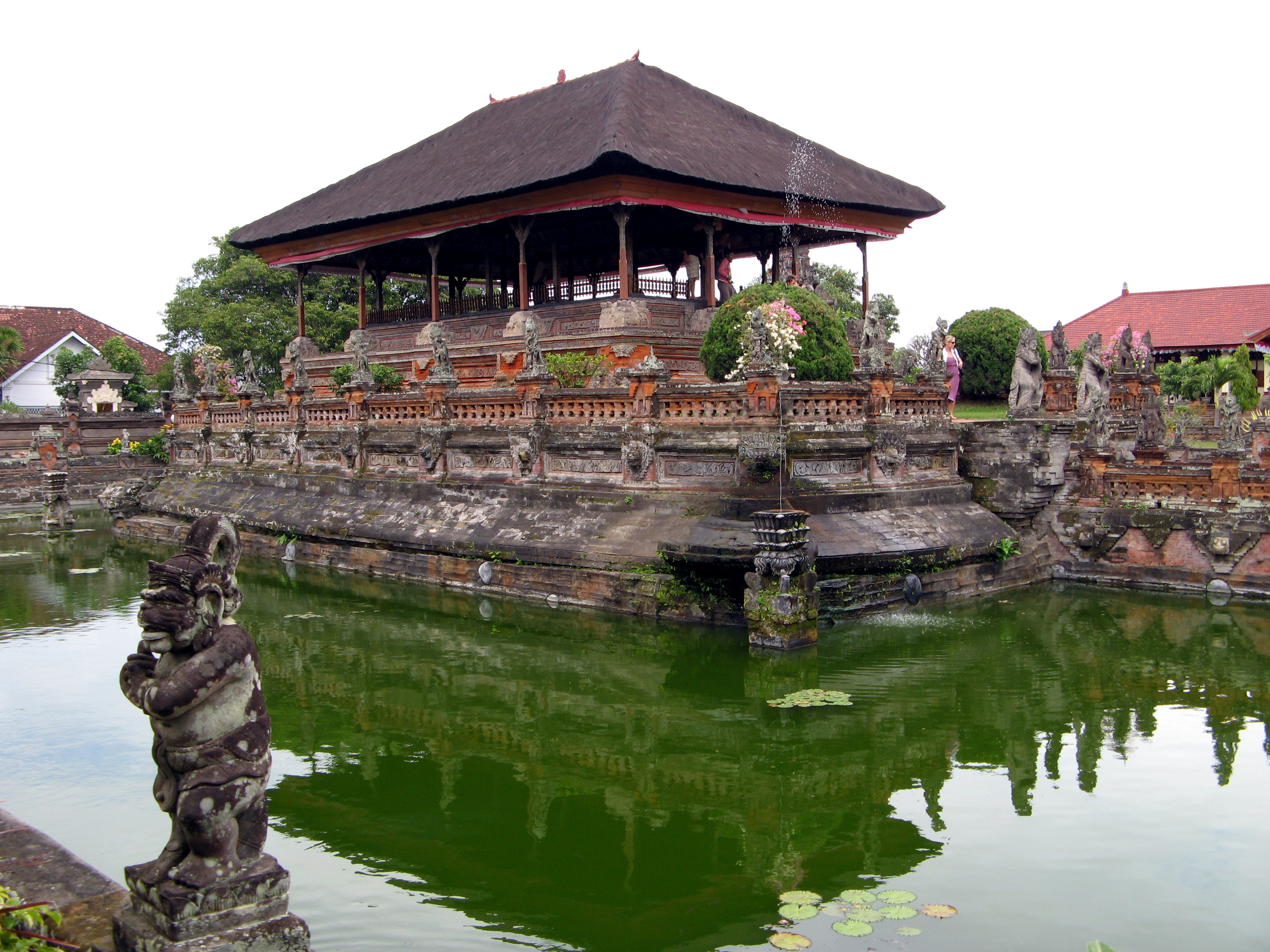
Balinese pavilion, Bali

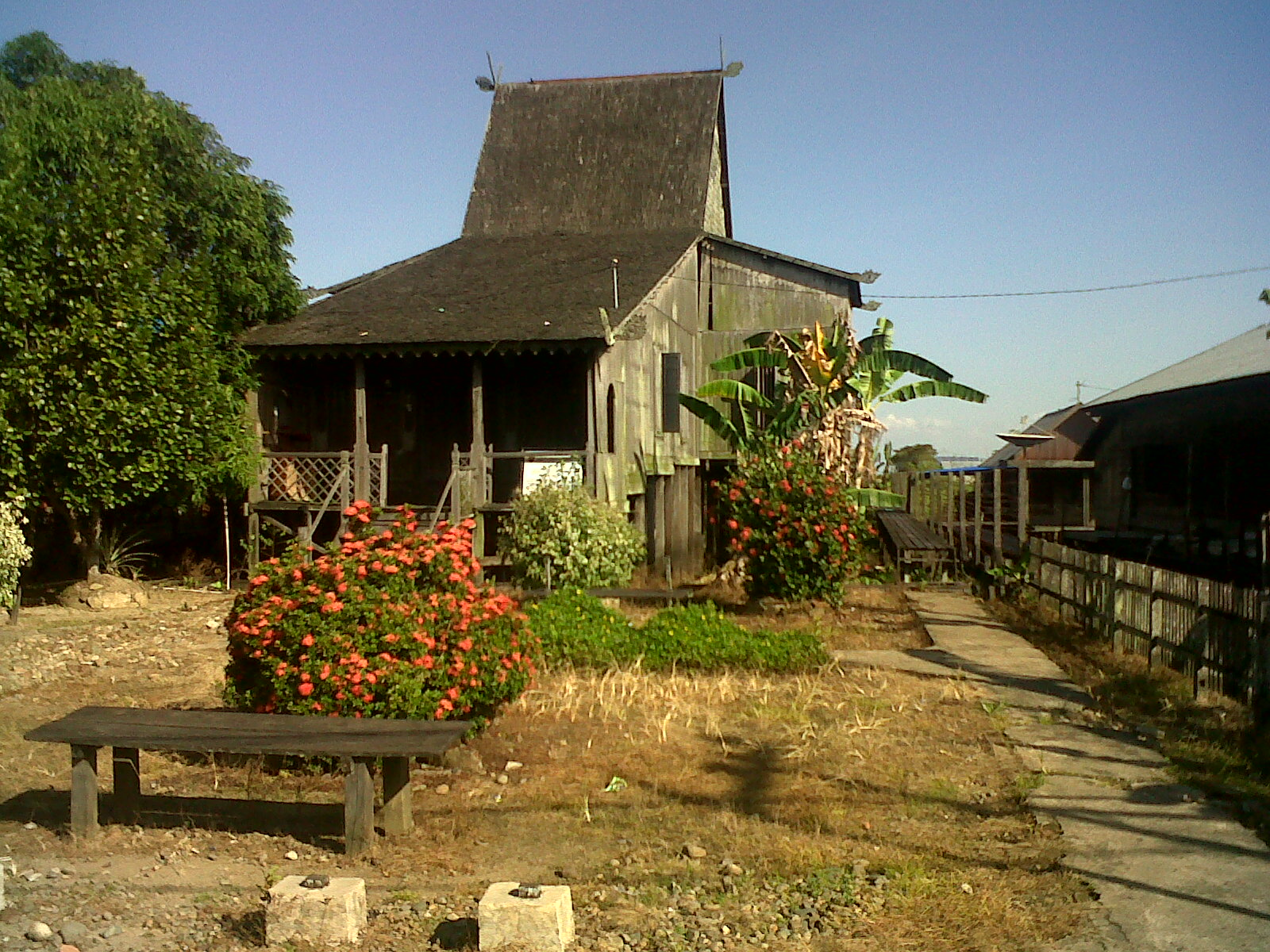
Rumah Bubungan Tinggi, South Kalimantan

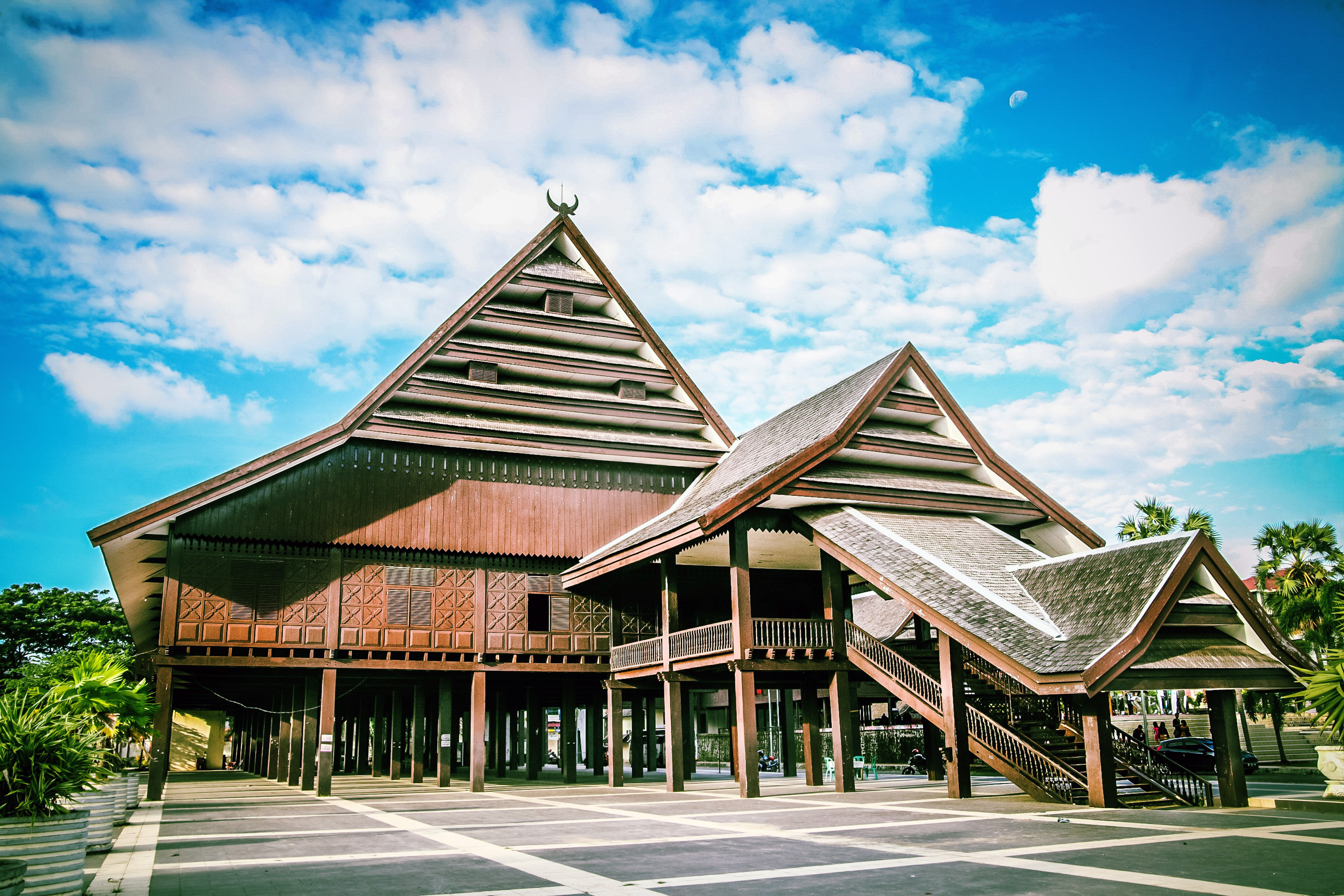
Bugis house, South Sulawesi

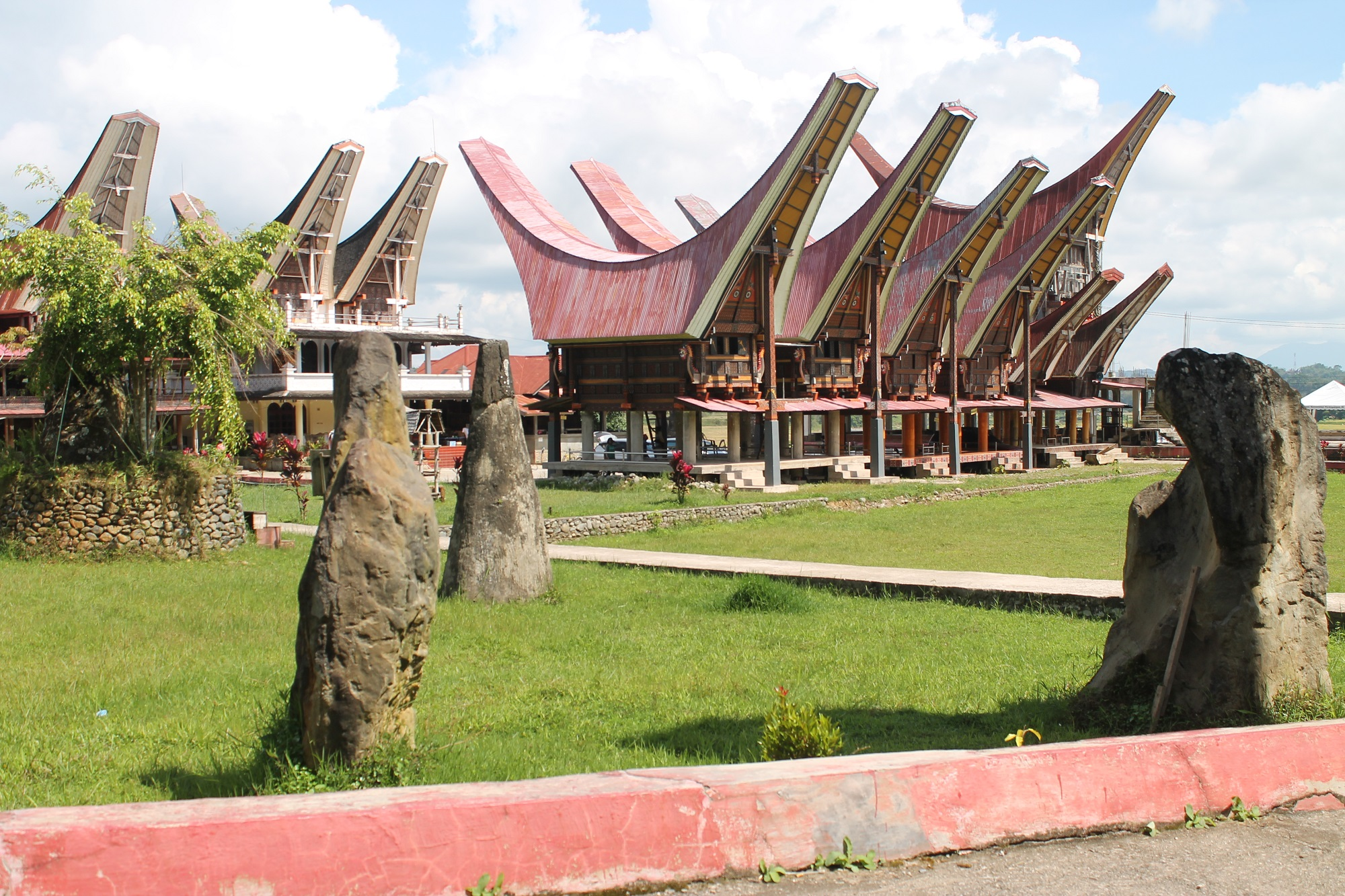
Houses in a Torajan village, South Sulawesi

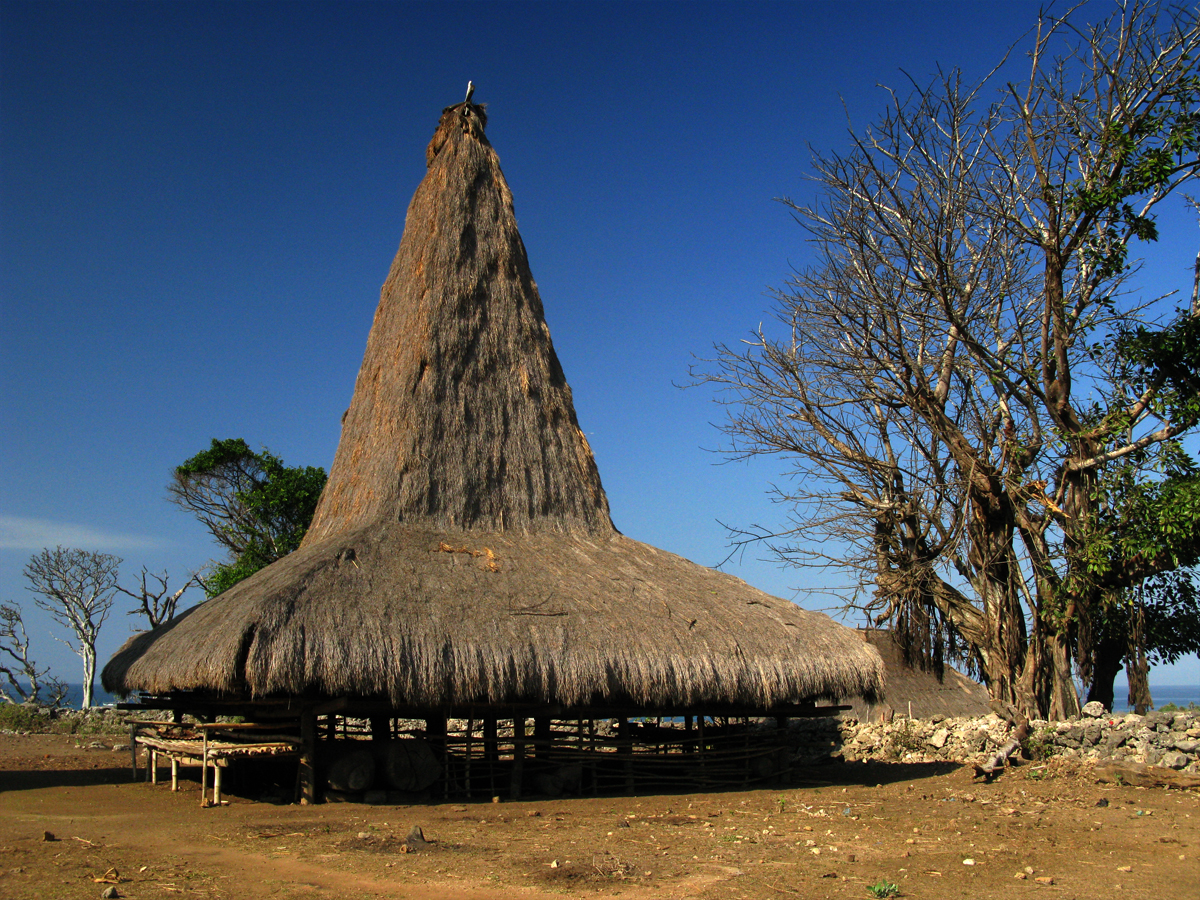
Sumba house, East Nusa Tenggara

== Decline ==
The numbers of rumah adat are decreasing across Indonesia. This trend dates from the colonial period, with the Dutch generally viewing traditional architecture as unhygienic, with big roofs that sheltered rats. Multi-family homes were viewed with suspicion by religious authorities, as were those aspects of the rumah adat linked to traditional belief. In parts of the Indies, colonial authorities embarked on vigorous demolition programmes, replacing traditional homes with houses built using Western construction techniques, such as bricks and corrugated iron roofs, fitting sanitary facilities and better ventilation. Traditional craftsmen were retrained in Western building techniques. Since independence, the Indonesian government has continued to promote the 'rumah sehat sederhana' ('simple healthy home') over the rumah adat.

Exposure to the market economy made the construction of labour-intensive rumah adat, such as the Batak house, extremely expensive (previously villages would work together to construct new homes) to build and maintain. In addition, deforestation and population growth meant that the hardwoods were no longer a free resource to be gathered as needed from nearby forests, but instead a too-expensive commodity. Combined with a general appetite for modernity, the great majority of Indonesians now dwell in generic modern buildings rather than traditional rumah adat.

In areas with many tourists, such as the Tanah Toraja, rumah adat are preserved as a spectacle for tourists, their former residents living elsewhere, with design elements exaggerated to the point that these rumah adat are considerably less comfortable than the original designs. While in most areas rumah adat have been abandoned, in a few remote areas they are still current, and in other areas buildings in the style of the rumah adat are maintained for ceremonial purposes, as museums or for official buildings.

== Contemporary adaptation ==
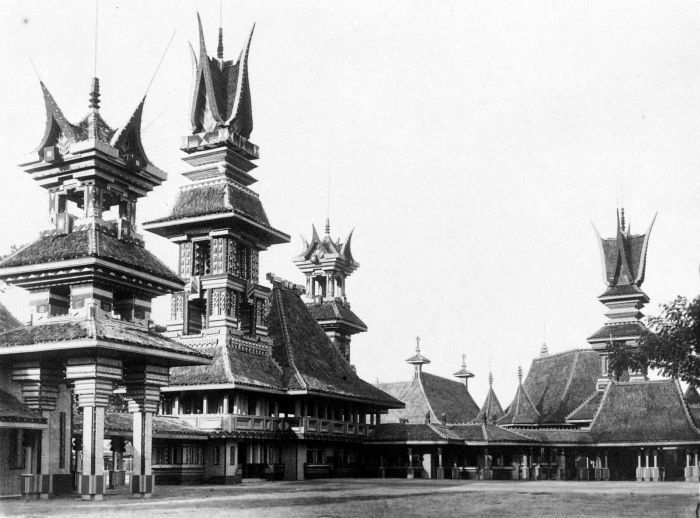
Gates and pavilions of annual Gambir Fair draw influences and combine elements from rumah adat, such as these pavilion that combines Karo, Minang and Javanese style.

During the colonial Dutch East Indies period around the first half of the 20th century, the typical style and elements of vernacular Indonesian rumah adat were often used as the inspiration, recreated and replicated intentionally to represent the cultural diversity of the colony, also intended to create a festive atmosphere with fantastic architecture. The annual Pasar Gambir for example — a fair held between 1906 and 1942 in Batavia, was known to have gates, stages, towers and pavilions constructed in rumah adat style drawn from all over the archipelago. Each year, these uniquely designed rumah adat pavilions were created and constructed anew using locally available materials, thus also become the attraction of the fair.

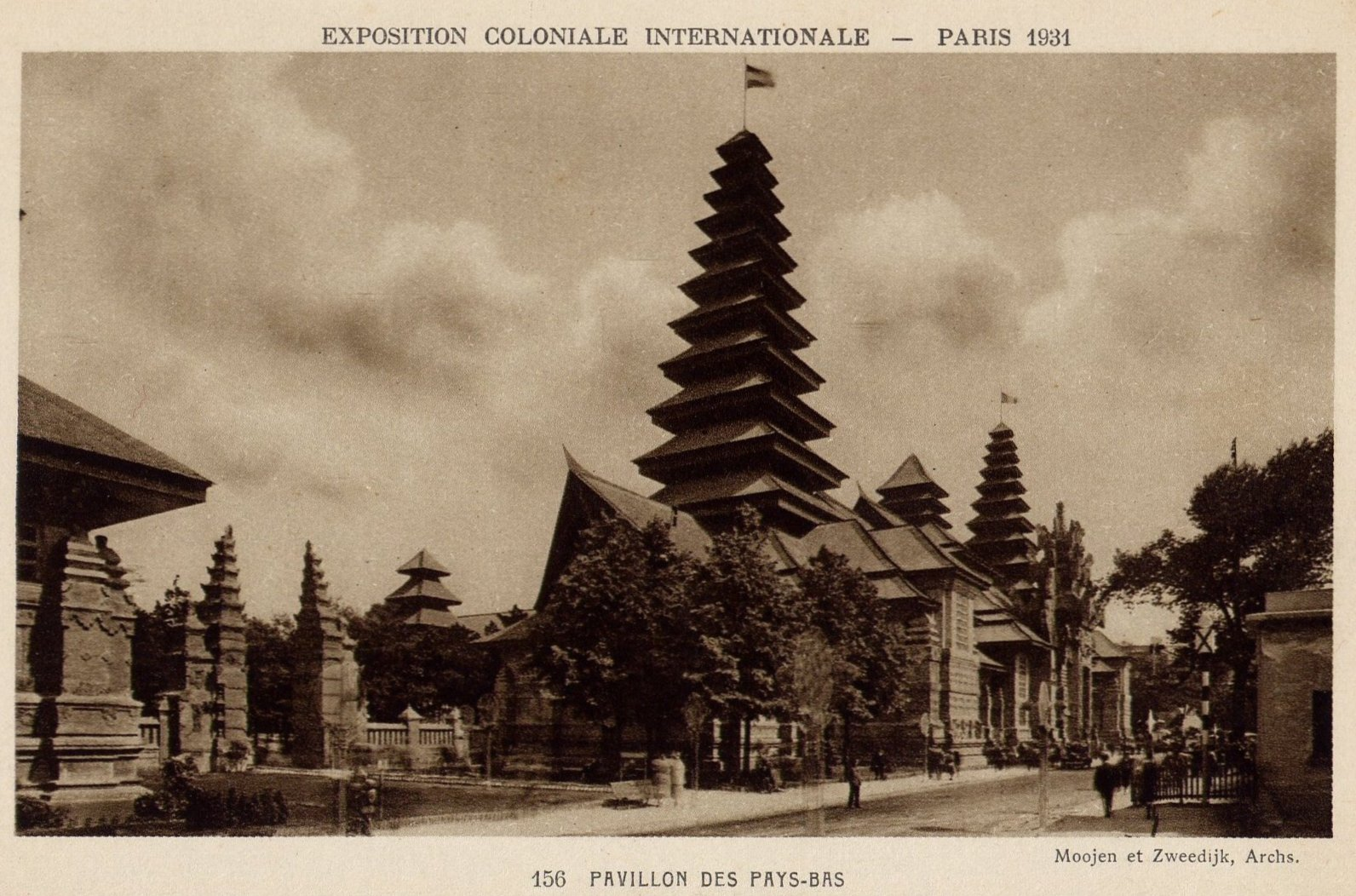
The Dutch colonial pavilion in Paris Colonial Exposition 1931 showcasing a synthesis of various rumah adat of the Dutch East Indies.

This period also saw the pride and desire to showcase the cultural diversity of the colony through showcasing the vernacular architecture of the archipelago. In 1931, during Paris Colonial Exposition, the Netherlands presented a beautiful cultural synthesis from their colony — the Dutch East Indies. The Dutch colonial pavilion was located on exhibition lot as wide as 3 hectares and was built based on the combination of many cultural elements of the Nusantara (Indonesian archipelago), a combination of Indonesian vernacular architecture. It has walls consisted of 750,000 pieces of ironwood from Kalimantan (Indonesian Borneo). As the centerpiece, the front part is decorated with twin 50 metres-tall Balinese Meru towers. The pavilion's roof was done in tumpang or tajug style, a signature of Javanese mosque, completed with carved wooden door of kori agung typical towering portal of pura Balinese temple, combined with arched roof of Minangkabau's atap bagonjong typical of rumah gadang. This fusion of Indonesian vernacular architecture presented a splendid and majestic palace-like pavilion. However, on 28 June 1931, an enormous fire burnt down the Dutch pavilion, along with all cultural objects displayed inside.

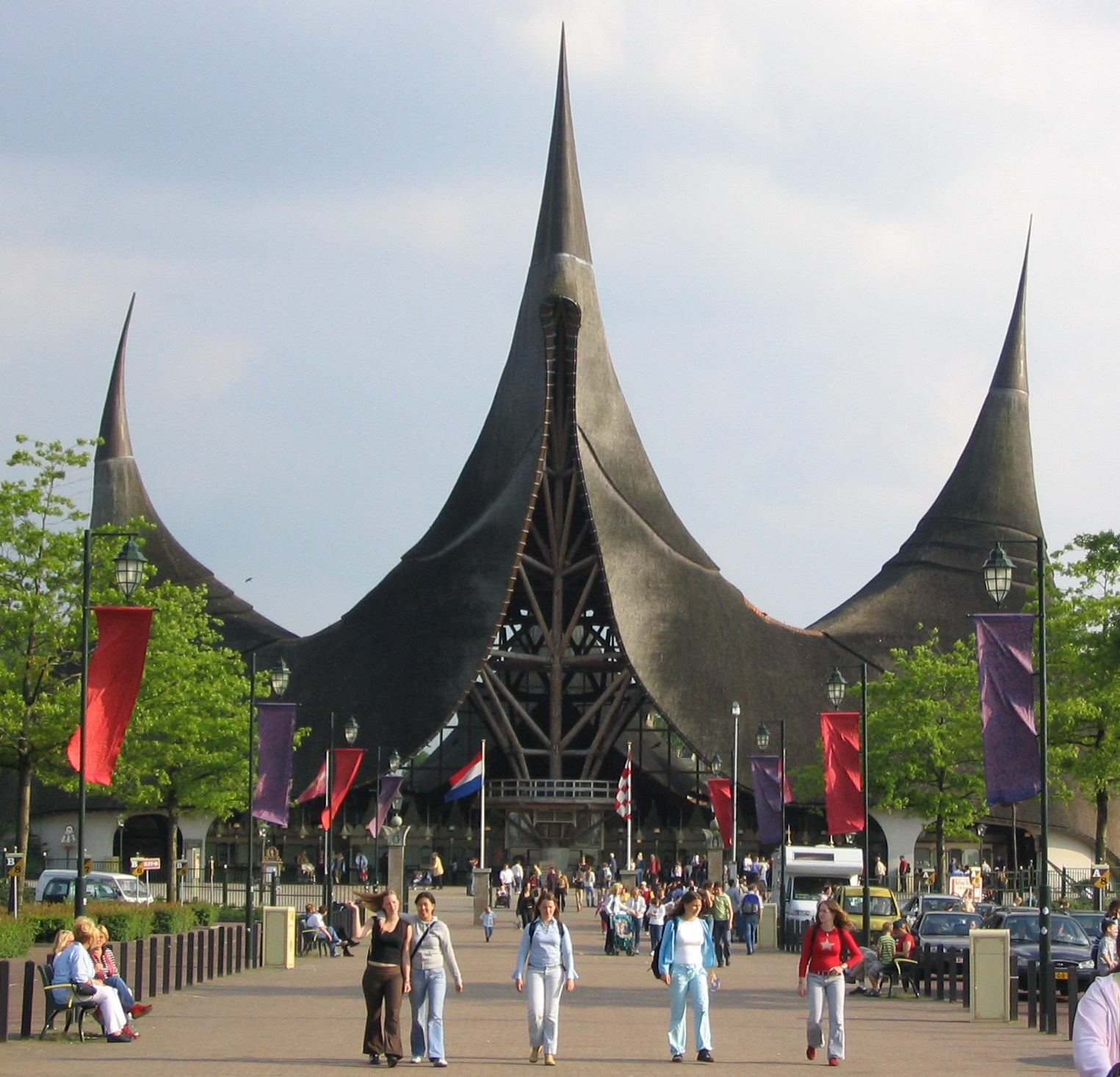
The House of the Five Senses, Efteling theme park, The Netherlands. An example of a modern building constructed using Western techniques, based on a rumah gadang design

Buildings are sometimes built with modern construction techniques that include stylistic elements from rumah adat, such as The House of the Five Senses in the Efteling, a building modeled on the Minangkabau rumah gadang. In the colonial period some Europeans constructed homes according to hybrid Western-adat designs, such as Bendegom, who built a 'transitional' Western-Batak Karo house.

In numbers of places, elements or ornaments of rumah adat has become the regional identity of provinces or regencies (kabupaten). Thus the construction of government and public buildings are encouraged to include or feature this native architectural elements. Despite technically the new buildings are constructed in contemporary technique with concrete frames and brick walls, instead of traditional timber carpentry. Most often the result is the implant of traditional roof sit on top of modern buildings. This tendency can be seen in West Sumatra and Tana Toraja, where the typical Minang bagonjong (horned) roof and Toraja tongkonan roof are implanted in almost any public buildings; from airports to hotels, restaurants and government offices.

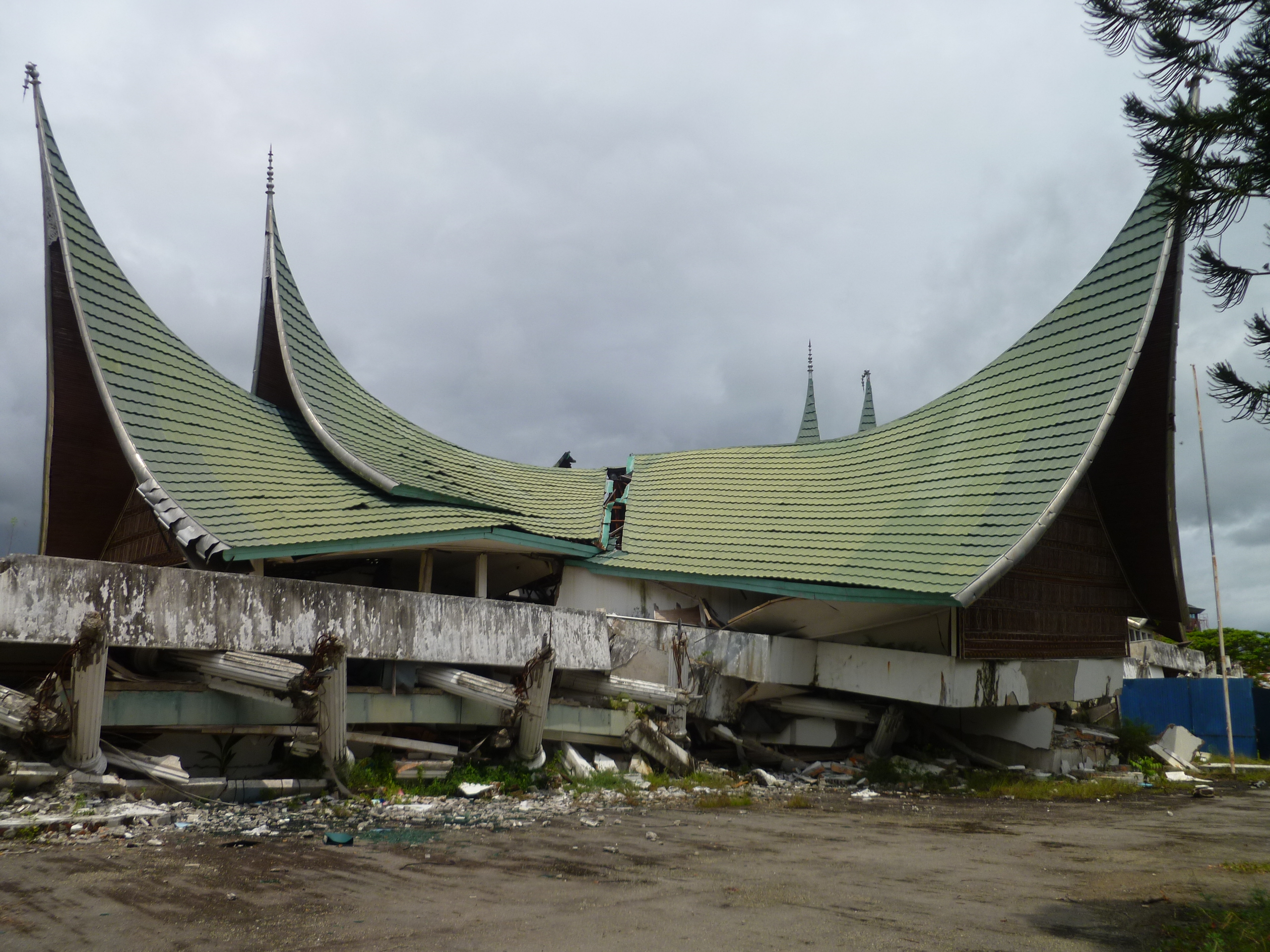
Collapsed concrete rumah adat with bagonjong roof caused by 2009 Padang earthquake

It has been noted that the traditional wooden houses are generally more earthquake-resistant than modern brick designs, although they are more vulnerable to fire. The construction of modern concrete framed and brick walled rumah adat has undermine the very characteristic of traditional wooden house, which is its flexibility to absorb shock-waves generated by an earthquake. These concrete rumah adat-style building often can not withstand earthquake and collapsed, like those buildings collapsed in 2009 Padang earthquake. In some areas, a 'semi-modern' rumah adat concept has been adopted, such as among some Ngada people, with traditional elements placed inside a concrete shell.

== See also ==
- Architecture of Indonesia
- Javanese traditional house
- Balinese traditional house
- Rumah gadang
- Malay houses
- Bahay kubo
- Bahay na Bato
- Torogan

== Bibliography ==
- Reimar Schefold, P. Nas, Gaudenz Domenig, Indonesian Houses: Tradition and Transformation in Vernacular Architecture, 2004, National University of Singapore Press, Singapore, ISBN 9789971692926
- Dawson, B., Gillow, J., The Traditional Architecture of Indonesia, 1994 Thames and Hudson Ltd, London, ISBN 0-500-34132-X
- Schoppert, P., Damais, S., Java Style, 1997, Didier Millet, Paris, 207 pages, ISBN 962-593-232-1
- Wijaya, M., Architecture of Bali: A source book of traditional and modern forms, 2002 Archipelago Press, Singapore, 224 pages, ISBN 981-4068-25-X
- Peter JM. Nas, The House in Indonesia
