= Kebaya house =

Betawi Traditional House in Jakarta, Indonesia

Rumah Kebaya
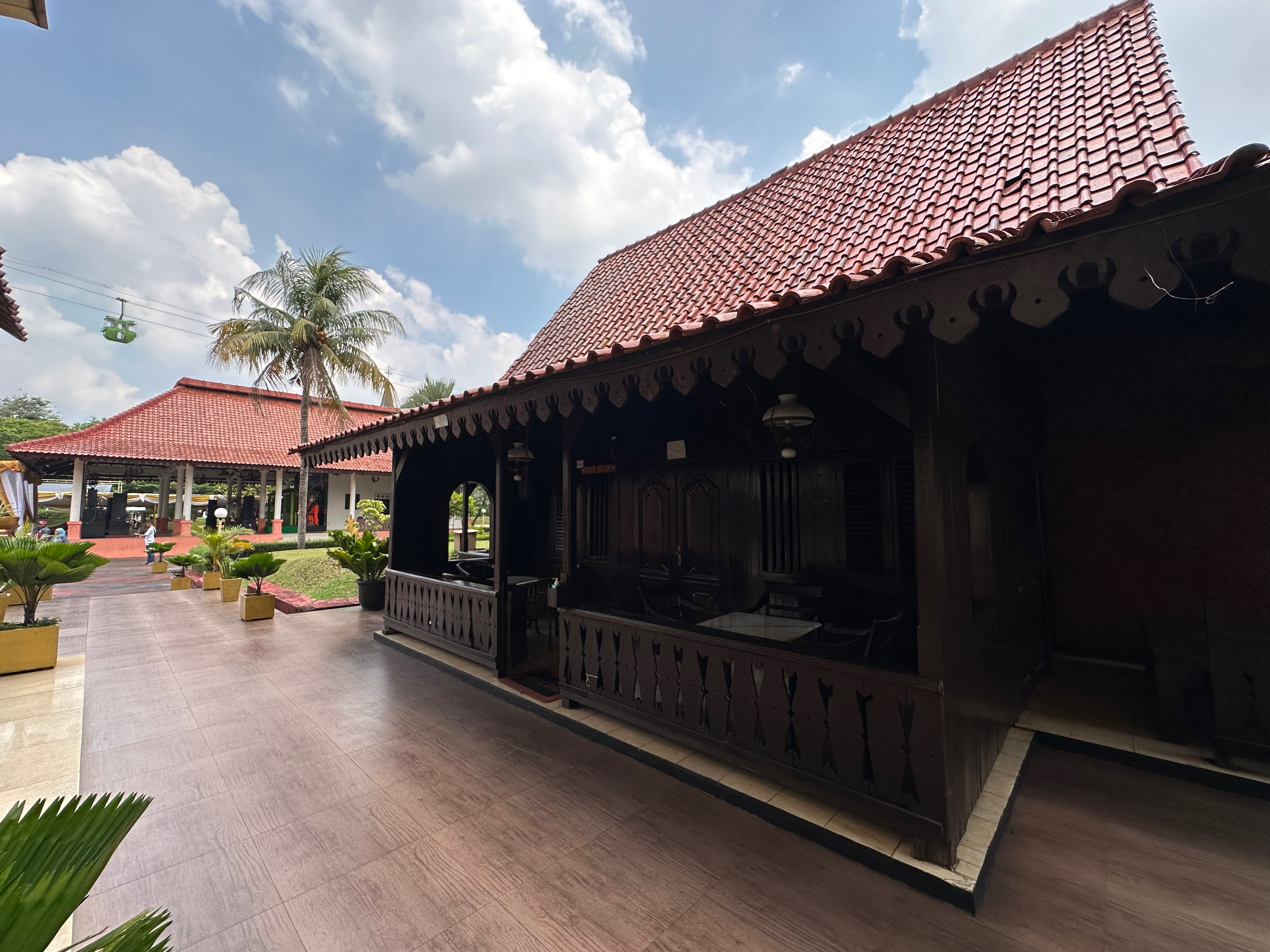
- Rumah Kebaya in Jakarta
- Alternative names: Rumah Adat Kebaya

General information
- Status: Residences
- Type: Traditional House
- Architectural style: Indonesian
- Location: Jakarta, Indonesia
- Owner: Betawis

Rumah Kebaya is a name of a Betawi traditional house. The name comes from the shape of the roof, which resembles a fold of the Kebaya form of dress. The fold can be seen from the side of the house. Beside that, the Betawi have other traditional houses, namely Rumah Gudang and Rumah Joglo. Although the Betawi have 3 traditional houses, but the government admitted Rumah Kebaya as a legitimate house of Betawi society. A main characteristic of this house is its wide terrace, which may serve to receive a visitor and as a place for relaxing.

In the past, Betawi society usually made a well in front of their house and funerals took place beside their house. The wall is made from wooden panel which may be moved horizontally to enlarge the room. The house may be divided into two parts, for example the front of the house may be used as a public area, and the rear of the house reserved for private use.

== See also ==
- Rumah adat
