= Tongkonan =

Traditional home of the Torajan people

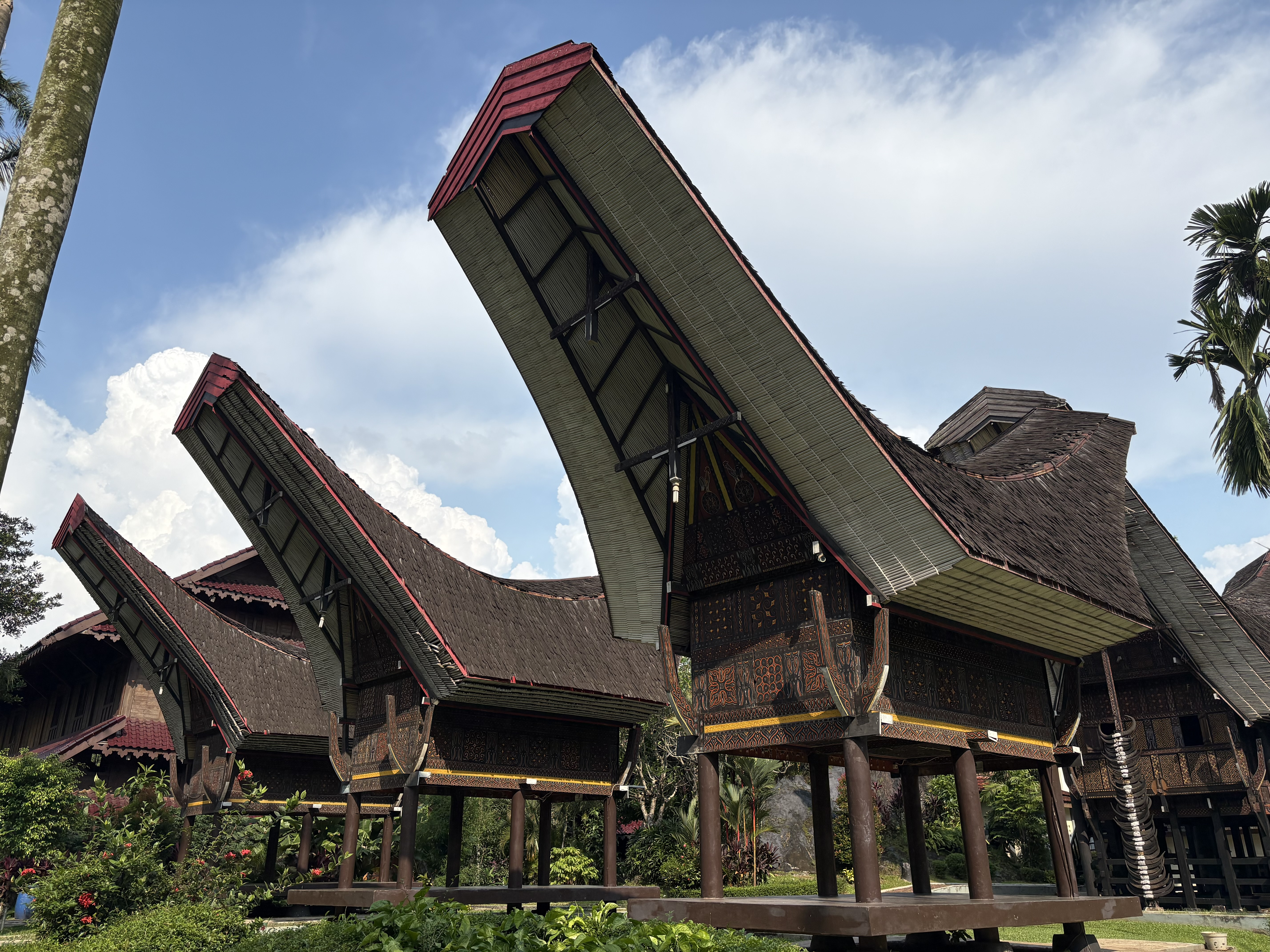
- A row of tongkonans in Taman Mini Indonesia Indah, Jakarta.
- Alternative names: Rumah Adat Tongkonan

General information
- Status: Residences
- Type: Traditional House
- Architectural style: Indonesian
- Location: Tana Toraja (South Sulawesi), Indonesia
- Owner: Torajan

Tongkonan is the traditional ancestral house, or rumah adat, of the Torajan people in South Sulawesi, Indonesia. Tongkonan has a distinguishing boat-shaped and oversized saddleback roof. Like most of the Indonesia's Austronesian-based traditional architecture, tongkonan is built on piles. Its construction is a laborious task, and it is usually built with the help of all family members or friends. In the original Toraja society, only nobles had the right to build tongkonan. Commoners live in smaller and less decorated homes called banua.

== Background ==
Sulawesi (formerly known as the Celebes) is a large island, extraordinarily contorted in shape, lying between Kalimantan (Indonesian Borneo) and the Maluku Island group (also known as the Moluccas). It is an island abundant in natural resources with a rich and varied array of cultures, including some of the most distinctive and anthropologically significant in Indonesia. The dominant groups of the island are the seafaring and once piratical Muslim Bugis and Makassarese residing in the island's south-west, and the strongly Christian Minahasa of the northern peninsula. The Toraja of South Sulawesi are, however, arguably one of the most distinctive of ethnic groups in all Indonesia.

The name Toraja is of Bugis origin and is given to the people of rugged northern part of the south peninsula. The Toraja are the Austronesian ethnic group, speaking various related Malayo-Polynesian languages. Like many Indonesian ethnic groups, the Toraja were head-hunters and participants in inter-village raids; villages were thus located strategically on hill tops and were heavily fortified. The Dutch colonialists pacified the Toraja and led them to build their villages in valleys and changed their agriculture from a slash and burn variety to wet-rice cultivation, and pig and buffalo raising.

The native religion is megalithic and animist. Many of these native practices remain including animal sacrifices, ostentatious funeral rites and huge communal feasts. Their native faith only began to change when Protestant missionaries first arrived in 1909 with Dutch colonists. Today, the Toraja are 60 per cent Protestant Christians and 10 per cent Muslim. The beliefs of the rest are centered on the native religions. The Toraja are largely Christian and animist.

Toraja are divided into different geographic groups, the most important being Mamasa, centred on the isolated Kalumpang valley and the Sa’dan of the southern Toraja lands. Known as 'Tana Toraja', Sa'dan has the market towns of Makale and Rantepao. There have never been any strong lasting political grouping within the Toraja. Good roads now reach Tana Toraja from Makassar, the largest city in Sulawesi. This brings in a seasonal influx of foreign tourists who, whilst injecting their money into the local economy, have not yet had much lasting impact on local people's lives.

== Etymology and history ==
The word 'tongkonan' is derived from the Toraja word tongkon (‘to sit’) and literally means the place where family members meet.

According to the Torajan myth, the first tongkonan house was built in heaven by Puang Matua, the Creator. It was built on four poles and the roof was made of Indian cloth. When the first Torajan ancestor descended to earth, he imitated the heavenly house and held a big ceremony. An alternative legend, describes the Toraja arriving from the north by boats, but caught in a fierce storm, their boats were so badly damaged that they used them as roofs for their new houses.

There are three types of tongkonan. Tongkonan layuk is the house of the highest authority and it is used as the center of government. The second type is tongkonan pekamberan, which belongs to the family group members, who have some authorities in local traditions (known as adat). The last one is tongkonan batu, which belongs to the ordinary family members.

== Construction ==
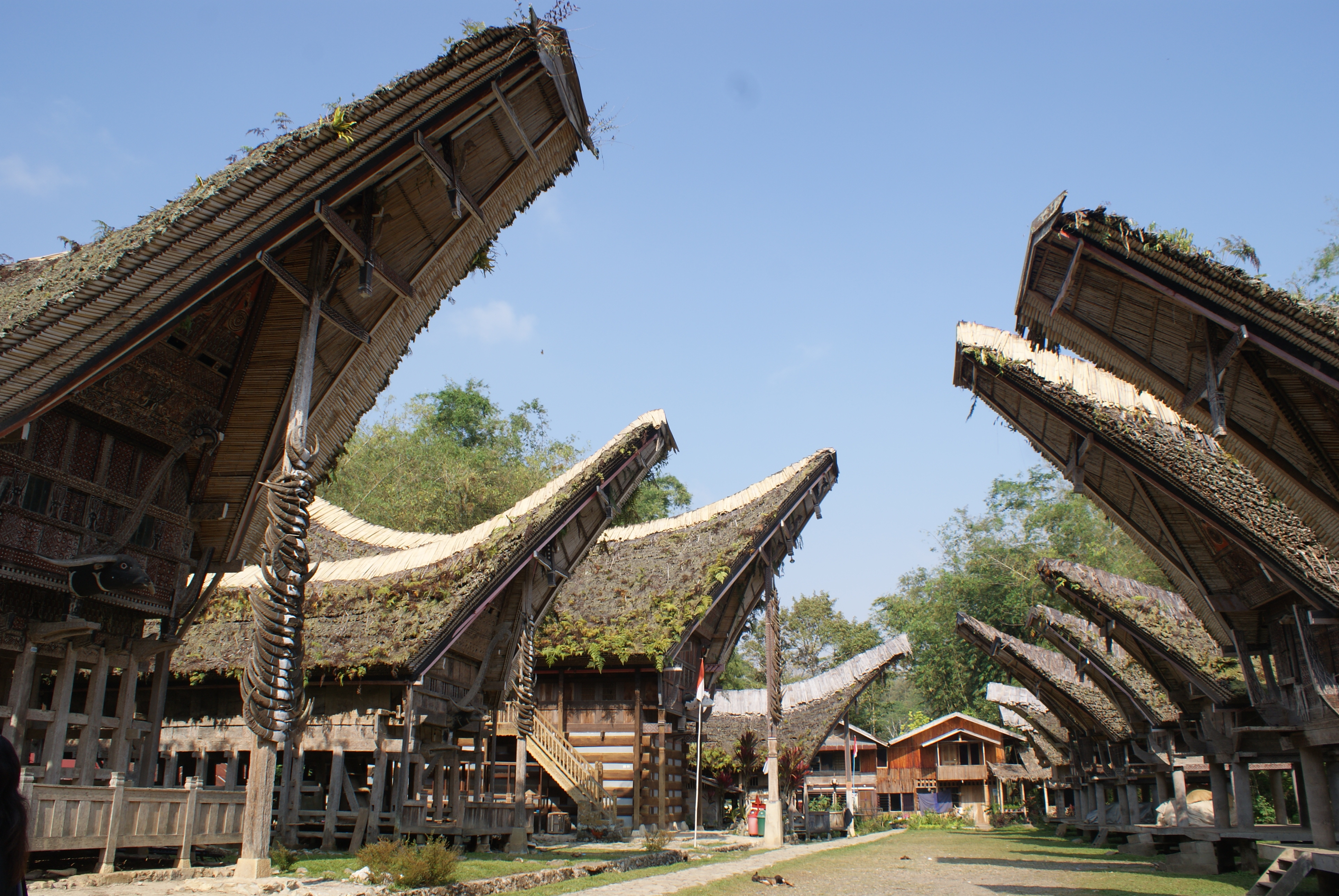
Tongkonan in a Torajan village

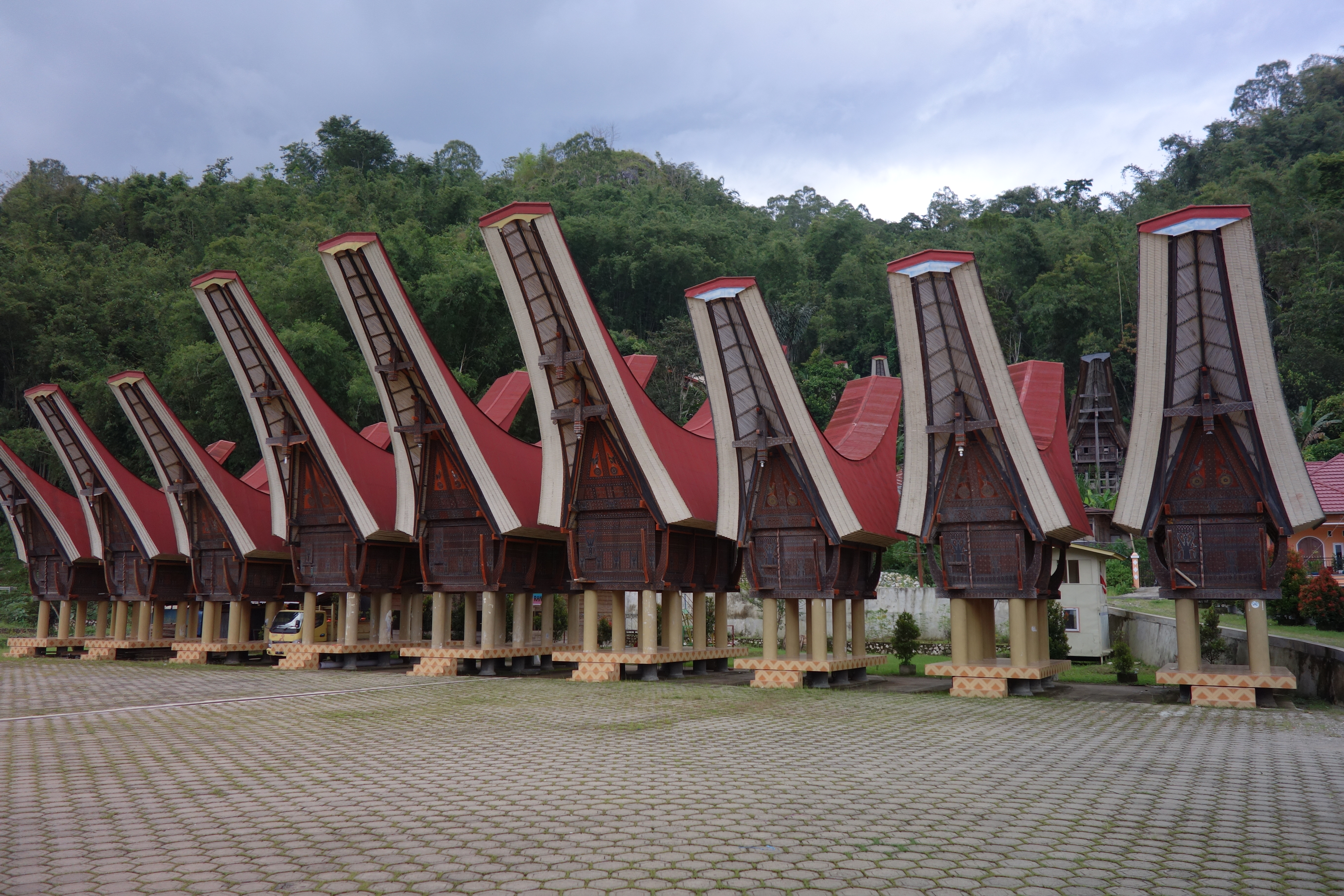
Modern tongkonan

Tongkonan are customarily built facing north-south. Dominating the entire structure is the saddleback roof with gables that are dramatically upswept. The internal space is small in comparison with the overwhelming roof structure that covers it. Interiors are typically cramped and dark with few windows, however, most of daily life is lived outside the homes, with interiors simply intended for sleeping, storage, meetings and occasionally protection.

A large tongkonan can take a crew of ten about three months to build and another month to carve and paint the outside walls. Bamboo scaffold is erected for the duration of the construction phase. Traditionally tongue and groove joinery has been used without the need for nails. A number of components are pre-fabricated with final assembly in-situ. Although built on a log cabin-style sub-structure, tongkonan are set on large vertical wooden piles with mortises cut into their ends to grasp the horizontal tie beams. The tops of the piles are notched for the longitudinal and transverse beams that support the upper structure. The remainder of the sub-structure is assembled in-situ. The transverse beams are fitted into the notched piles, and then notched to fit the longitudinal beams. Side panels, which are often decorated, are then formed on these main horizontal beams. The distinctive curved roof shape is obtained through a series of vertical hanging spars supporting upwardly angled beams. A vertical free-standing pole supports that portion of the ridge pole extending beyond the ridge purlin. Bamboo staves bound with rattan are assembled transversely in layers and tied longitudinally to the rafters forming the roof. The under roofing is of bamboo culm. Wooden boards laid over thick hardwood joists form the floors. Nowadays, zinc roofing sheets and nails are increasingly used.

In larger Tana Toraja villages, houses are arranged in a row, side by side, with their roofs on a north-south alignment with the front gable facing north. Opposite each house is the family's rice barn, or alang customarily a symbol of family wealth, and together they form a second row of parallel buildings. Houses of the Mamasa Toraja, however, are orientated to the direction of the river with their rice barns aligned perpendicular to the house.

The tongkonan at Ke'te' Kesu' is reputed to be 500 years old; too old to trace a direct descendant from the founder to maintain the title that goes with the house. The buildings themselves, however, are constantly maintained and renewed, thus this age refers to the length of time years for which that particular site has been used as a meeting place.

== Social significance ==
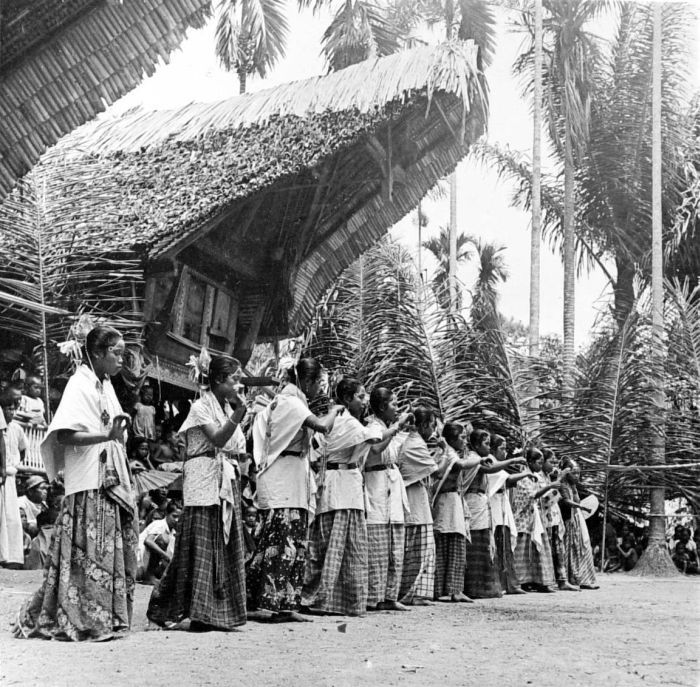
Dancers perform in front of tongkonan at a Torajan funeral

Common to Toraja of all religions is the cultural centrality of the tongkonan as ancestral homes. The homes are the focus of family identity and tradition, representing the descendants of a founding ancestor. Kis Jovak et al. (1988) describes the tongkonan as being not simply a house but symbolising a Torajan's microcosm.

As the focus of ancestral identity, it is through the tongkonan that Torajans consider themselves related to parents, grandparents and more distant relatives. Torajans belong to more than one house as they trace descent bilaterally - that is, through both the male and female line. Upon marriage, Toraja men customarily live in their wives' home. If divorced, possession of the house is granted to the wife, although the husband may be compensated by being given the rice barn which can be dismantled and reassembled. A tongkonan, however, is never removed, in part because of the large number of placentae buried on the east side of the house (east is associated with life).

The tongkonan is traditionally seen as the navel of the universe and a miniature cosmos; and in those some regions, it is the meeting place of the north-south and east-west axes. It faces north, to the “head of the sky” where Puang Matua resides. The alang, or rice granaries, across the yard, face south or the posterior, as this is the direction from which trouble and disease exit. In some regions, the house is entered via a door on the northern end of the east wall, and in others, at the western end of the north wall. A person, thus, walks towards the southwest or southeast as they enter. The tongkonan is vertically divided into three levels: the attic where the regalia and family heirlooms are kept; the living area; and the space under the floor where domesticated animals are kept. These compare with the upper world, the middle world, and the under world.

There are three types of tongkonan which are classified according to their function in society. A tongkonan layuk ('grand tongkonan') or tongkonan pesio' aluk ('aluk maker') is the original ancestral home in which the aluk of a particular adat territory were established. Tongkonan according to its literal translation, is the place 'to sit' and it is the traditional centre of governance. Customarily people would assemble to sit in a place of historical significance to discuss and resolve matters of communal import. This site would be the seat of residence of the most respected member of the community. This home would thus be developed into a grand building.

The second type is tongkonan pekamberan, or tongkonan pekaindoran which belongs to the family group members and offspring of the founder. It is their duty to carry out local traditions (known as adat). The last one is tongkonan batu, which belongs to the ordinary family members. Traditionally, only the nobility could afford to build large tongkonan and the elaborate ceremonies associated with them.

Ordinary residences, known as banua are smaller, less decorated homes versions of tongkonan, through which families’ descent would also be traced. Generally speaking their occupants would be families of lower social status, families that once constituted part of a greater family's fiefdom. These homes may also be converted into tongkonan after several generations of the same line have lived in them and after suitable rites have been carried out, but due to prohibitive costs, this has traditionally been rare. The former exclusivity of the tongkonan is also diminishing as many Toraja commoners find employment in other parts of Indonesia and remit funds back to their families, enabling in some cases the construction of larger Tongkonan by commoners.

== Ornamentation ==
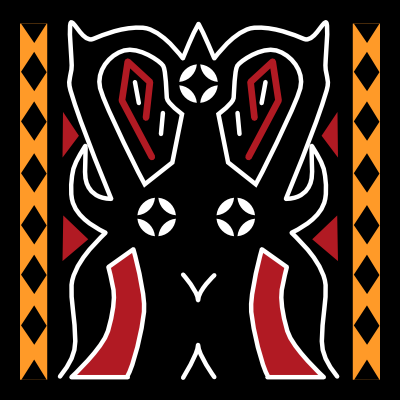
pa'tedong (buffalo) representing prosperity and ritual sacrifice

Gables and the outside walls of tongkonan are often decorated by red, black, and yellow colored wood, with patterns carved into it. Toraja society, however, is highly hierarchical and traditionally villagers have only been able to decorate their houses according to their social status, with the elite being the only ones who could carve their entire house exteriors with incised designs. Most carvings on tongkonan represent prosperity and fertility with the individual designs represent what is important to the particular family, some also represent the social status of the family associated with the tongkonan. Other houses have no carvings or painting; their surfaces are simply bare weather-worn timbers.

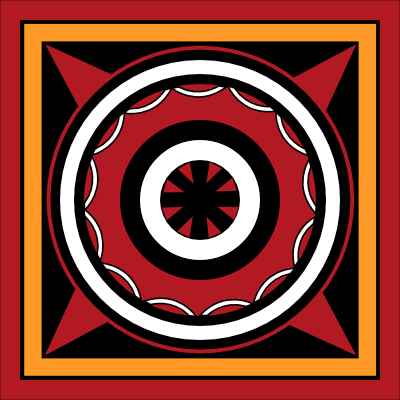
pa'barre allo (the sun and its rays)

Circular motifs represent the sun, the symbol of power. Golden kris ('daggers') motifs symbolise wealth. Geometric spiralling designs and motifs are used that include buffalo heads - representing a prosperity and ritual sacrifice. Cockerels are represented in the colours of red, white, yellow and black; colors which represent the indigenous Toraja religion the Aluk To Dolo (the Way of the Ancestors). Black symbolises death and darkness; yellow, God's blessing and power; white, the colour of flesh and bone symbolising purity; and red, the colour of blood symbolising human life. The pigments are sourced from common materials; black from soot; white from lime; red and yellow from colored earth; and tuak (palm wine) is used to strengthen the colors.

Many of the motifs are identical to those on Dong Son kettle drums. Another source of the motifs is thought to be Hindu-Buddhist, particularly the square cross motifs that may have alternatively been copied from Indian trade cloths. Christian toraja use the cross as a decorative symbol of their faith. Payment for the decorating artists has traditionally been in the form of buffalo. Water is also a common theme in designs and represents life, fertility and prolific rice fields.

Buffalo horns hung in a vertical array on the front gable are a sign of prestige and are customarily used to signify the wealth of the household. Furthermore, a buffalo head made from painted wood and buffalo-dung, but crowned with real horns, is mounted on the façades.

== Contemporary tongkonan ==
Although still commanding great prestige in a ritual sense, the tongkonan, like many traditional Indonesian housing styles, has a small, dark and smoky interior, and consequently is losing favour amongst contemporary Torajans. Instead, many Torajan villagers are choosing to live in a single storey 'Pan-Indonesia' style residence. The more spacious, brighter and more ventilated bugis-type dwelling is also increasingly being adopted. An approach more in line with tradition is to add an extra storey and a saddleback roof which fulfils contemporary expectations of space and brightness, while maintaining the prestige of a tongkonan.

Tongkonan are a viable part of the market for managed tourism, their seminal value drawing enough people to make Tana Toraja one of Indonesia's most significant destinations for international tourists; a region particularly popular with European visitors. Today, because tourism has displayed the richly carved tongkonan as a symbol of the Toraja ethnic group, tongkonans carved with geometric designs are often seen as symbols of Toraja ethnic identity and not just as symbols of elite identity.

== See also ==
- Architecture of Indonesia
