= Kurnianingrat =

Indonesian educator (1919–1993)

Raden Ajeng Kurnianingrat Sastrawinata
- Kurnianingrat, c. 1950
- Born: Koernia; 4 September 1919; Ciamis, Dutch East Indies
- Died: 18 October 1993 (aged 74); Jakarta, Indonesia
- Education: Cornell University (MA)
- Known for: Teaching English as a foreign language; educational psychology
- Spouse: Ali Sastroamidjojo (m. 1970; died 1975)
- Parents: Sulaeman Sastrawinata (father); Suhaemi (mother)

Raden Ajeng Kurnianingrat Sastrawinata (4 September 1919 – 18 October 1993), (Note: Until 1947, the Van Ophuijsen Spelling System was the orthography used for writing Indonesia's languages. Under this system, Kurnianingrat's name was written Raden Adjeng Koernianingrat Sastrawinata ([ra'dɛn a'dʒəŋ kʊrniaˈniŋrat sastrawi'nata]), as listed in Gunseikanbu (1943, p. 86). Among friends, Zainu'ddin (1997, p. 157) notes that she was known as Jo ([jo]), also written using the same spelling system.) more commonly known mononymously as Kurnianingrat, was an Indonesian educator and pioneer of the country's curriculum for teaching English as a foreign language. She was deputy director of Indonesia's English Language Inspectorate, a branch of the Ministry of Education, Instruction, and Culture, from 1953 to 1956. Later, she served as the head of the English studies department at the University of Indonesia.

Born to an aristocratic Sundanese family—her father the regent of Ciamis in West Java (then part of the Dutch East Indies colony) and her mother a schoolteacher from nearby Garut—Kurnianingrat attended Dutch-language schools and boarded with Dutch and Indo-European families. After high school, she graduated from teacher training schools with a teaching diploma, specializing in psychology. Her first teaching assignment, in 1938, was in Batavia (now Jakarta), where she first learned about the growing Indonesian nationalist movement. During and immediately following the Japanese occupation of the Indies, she worked and lived in Yogyakarta and was witness to and a participant in the Indonesian National Revolution. There, she met Indonesian prime minister Ali Sastroamidjojo, whom she would marry in 1970. Two of her students, Daoed Joesoef and Nugroho Notosusanto, became ministers of education.

Kurnianingrat spent time abroad to further her education; first, a one-year study in Sydney to learn about Australia's education system, then two years at Cornell University in the United States to complete a Master of Arts degree in English literature. She formed friendships with a number of foreign scholars of Indonesia, including Herbert Feith and his wife, Betty, Ailsa Thomson Zainuddin, and George McTurnan Kahin. Because of her experience working with the Feiths and Zainuddin, who were among Australia's first volunteers working on assignments for the Indonesian government, she became an early supporter of the Australia's international volunteering programs.

== Biography ==
=== Early life, family, and education ===
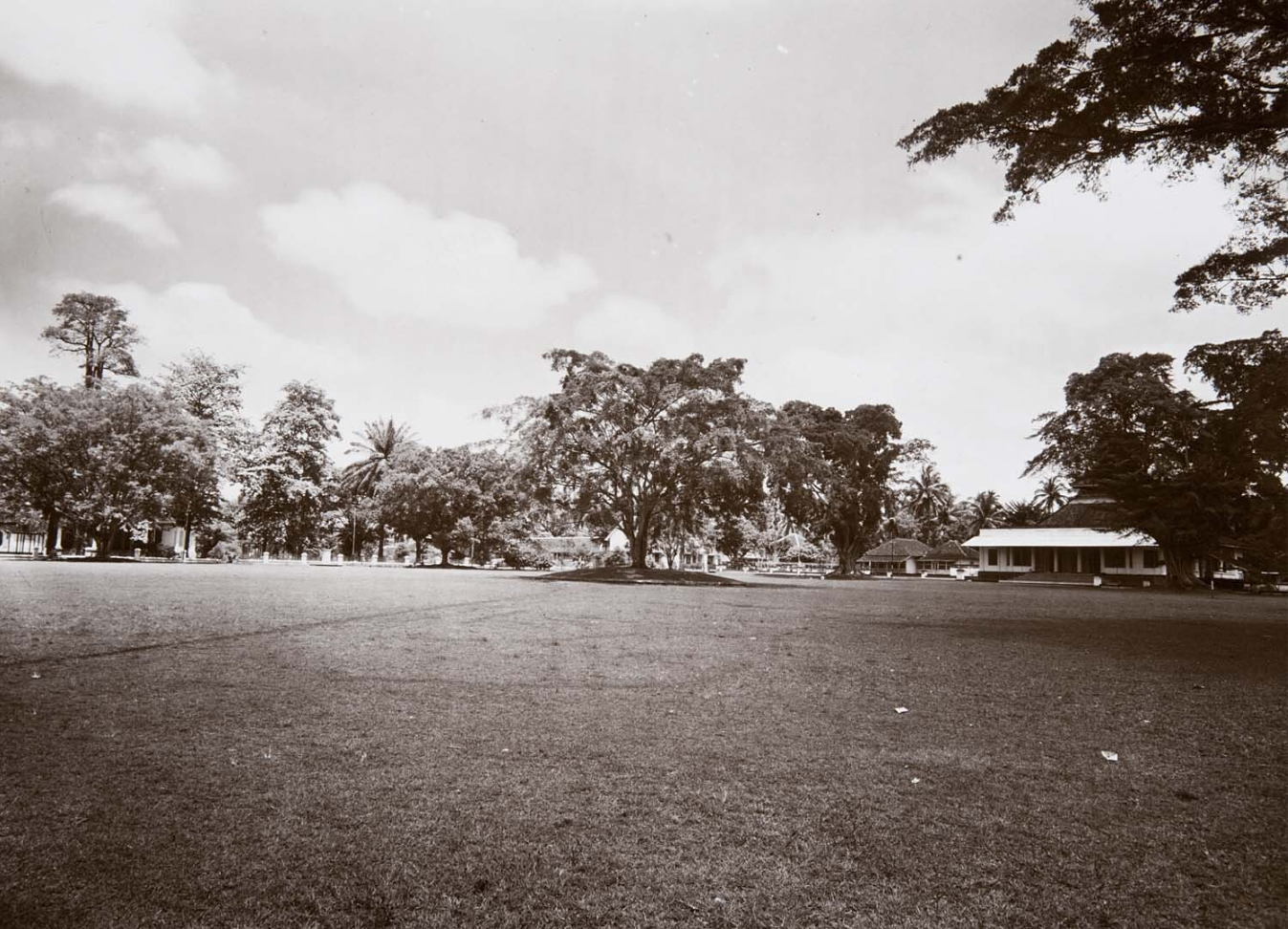
Alun-alun of Ciamis, c. 1925–1933. Kurnianingrat and her mother lived in a simple house near the mosque to the right, behind the tree line.

Kurnianingrat was born in Ciamis, a town near the border of West Java and Central Java, on 4 September 1919. (Note: Zainu'ddin (1994, p. 115) and Zainu'ddin (1997, p. 164) published conflicting information about Kurnianingrat's date of birth, with the former stating 14 September and the latter 4 September. This discrepancy appears to be corrected in McCarthy & Zainuddin (2017, p. 188), which included a letter, dated 17 September 1991, where Kurnianingrat writes, "Two weeks ago I celebrated my 72nd birthday [...]") Her father was Raden Adipati Aria Sulaeman Sastrawinata, a Sundanese aristocrat who was appointed the bupati (regent) of Ciamis by administrators of the Dutch East Indies colony that included Java. (Note: Prior to the arrival of European colonists, Java's traditional rulers during the Mataram Sultanate governed through a suzerainty. Palmier (1960, p. 205) notes that the Dutch adopted this form of governance as it subdued the island and allowed local rulers and their family members to oversee the country as representatives of the colonizing power.) He married Suhaemi, a schoolteacher from Garut and the daughter of a local landowner, after the death of his first wife from dysentery. Because his first wife did not bear any children, Sastrawinata named the first child from this marriage Kurnia, meaning gift. The name was later appended with ningrat, indicating aristocratic descent.

Suhaemi, on the other hand, was not of noble birth and, therefore, could not take the title Raden Ayu and become the principal wife of the regent. Ten days after Kurnianingrat's birth, her father married Kancananingrat, the widowed daughter of the regent of Sumedang, and she became his Raden Ayu. (Note: Sutherland (1973, p. 128) notes that the family line of Sumedang's regents held a central role in West Java's aristocratic families, having been the chief regents of Priangan—encompassing Cianjur, Sumedang, and Ciamis—during the time of the Mataram Sultanate. Their importance was reflected in their title of Pangeran, meaning prince, compared to other regents who held the titles Tumenggung (marquess) or Adipati (governor).) Kancananingrat treated Kurnianingrat like her own child and administered the affairs of the household. Meanwhile, Kurnianingrat and her birth mother lived in a separate house from the kabupaten, the residence of the regent and the Raden Ayu. She was always welcome at the kabupaten and visited daily for a few hours, often accompanying her father on inspection tours of the regency. A brother was born in 1924, and two sisters in 1932 and 1934.

Kurnianingrat began attending the village school at age three or four. In the following year, she was sent to nearby Tasikmalaya to live with an Indo-European family. This enabled her to learn Dutch, which promised opportunities for better education and employment during the colonial era. By age five, her knowledge of the language was sufficient for her to enter a European primary school in second form. She was then sent to Bandung at age seven to enter a school run by the Ursuline order. Having found no friends at school, she often visited the movie theater, learning German and improving her spoken English by watching foreign films. After completing junior high school, she attended the Indo-European Society's teacher training school (Indo-Europees Verbond Kweekschool) in Bandung. By then, her father had retired as regent and was renting a villa in the city, allowing Kurnianingrat to live with family during the school term. She followed the training course with a more advanced two-year course, which allowed her to earn a Hoofdacte (head teacher) certificate. During this time, she also taught part time at a girls' school.

=== Early career and wartime activities ===
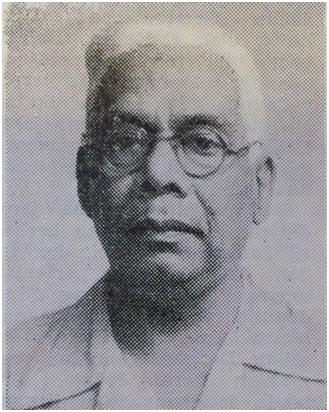
Baginda Dahlan Abdullah (1895–1950), who introduced Kurnianingrat to Indonesia's nationalist movement

In 1938, Kurnianingrat began her career teaching third grade at a Dutch-Chinese primary school in Glodok, the Chinese district of the colonial capital, Batavia. A colleague from Sumatra who taught sixth grade, Dahlan Abdullah, introduced her to the Indonesian nationalist movement opposing colonial rule. Through him, she became aware of injustices committed by the Dutch and discovered that most native Indonesians were not allowed admission at European primary schools like she was. At the request of her father, she was later transferred by the Ministry of Education to Purwakarta to teach at a European primary school. With the school being closer to home, her sister and some of her young nephews and nieces were enrolled there and taught by Kurnianingrat.

War soon broke out in Europe, and, as Germany began an invasion of the Netherlands, the school's headmaster left to join the defense effort. Kurnianingrat, as the next most qualified teaching staff, replaced him as headmaster, to the displeasure of the other teachers and the local colonial supervisor. However, with the prospect of a Japanese invasion of the Indies becoming more likely following their attack on Pearl Harbor in 1941, the school soon closed as Dutch families began leaving for Australia and elsewhere. Kurnianingrat also evacuated to the countryside with her family, and, by March 1942, Japanese forces occupied Purwakarta. The invasion caused her father to lose his pension from the Dutch colonial administration, so Kurnianingrat once again sought work in Batavia, by then renamed Jakarta by the Japanese military administration, after several months of unemployment. There, she reunited with her former colleague, Dahlan Abdullah, whom the Japanese had installed as the temporary head of municipal administration because of his anti-Dutch views. He offered her employment at the municipal office, though her salary was very small. Later, she applied at the Japanese Ministry of Education for an opening for a psychology teacher position at a Girls' Teacher Training School (Sekolah Guru Perempuan) in Yogyakarta. She first became interested in psychology as a student at the Indo-European Society teacher training school.

In Yogyakarta, Kurnianingrat observed that residents were regularly urged to speak the still-developing Indonesian language instead of a foreign language. As a frequent speaker of Dutch, she knew very little Indonesian, yet it was the primary medium of instruction at the school where she had to teach. A colleague had to translate her lessons into Indonesian, and she would memorize them for classes. As the economy worsened during the Japanese occupation, Kurnianingrat bartered batik cloth and sold her jewelry to support her family members' education. She was vacationing with family in Purwakarta when news of Japan's surrender to western Allies in 1945 reached the Indies. Days later, news of nationalist leaders Sukarno and Mohammad Hatta proclaiming the independence of Indonesia reached Yogyakarta through Australian radio broadcasts. Allied forces arrived in September to restore Dutch control, prompting the newly-formed republican government to relocate to Yogyakarta, bringing with them government officials, military commanders, foreign dignitaries, and journalists. In 1946, Kurnianingrat began teaching English at a senior high school and also reading English-language broadcasts for the Voice of Free Indonesia radio station. She and a fellow teacher, Utami Soerjadarma, were recruited to attend many state dinners at the presidential palace because not many Indonesians could speak English with foreign guests at the time. She hoped that, by attending the dinners, "I would help dispel the image of Indonesians being ignorant half savages."

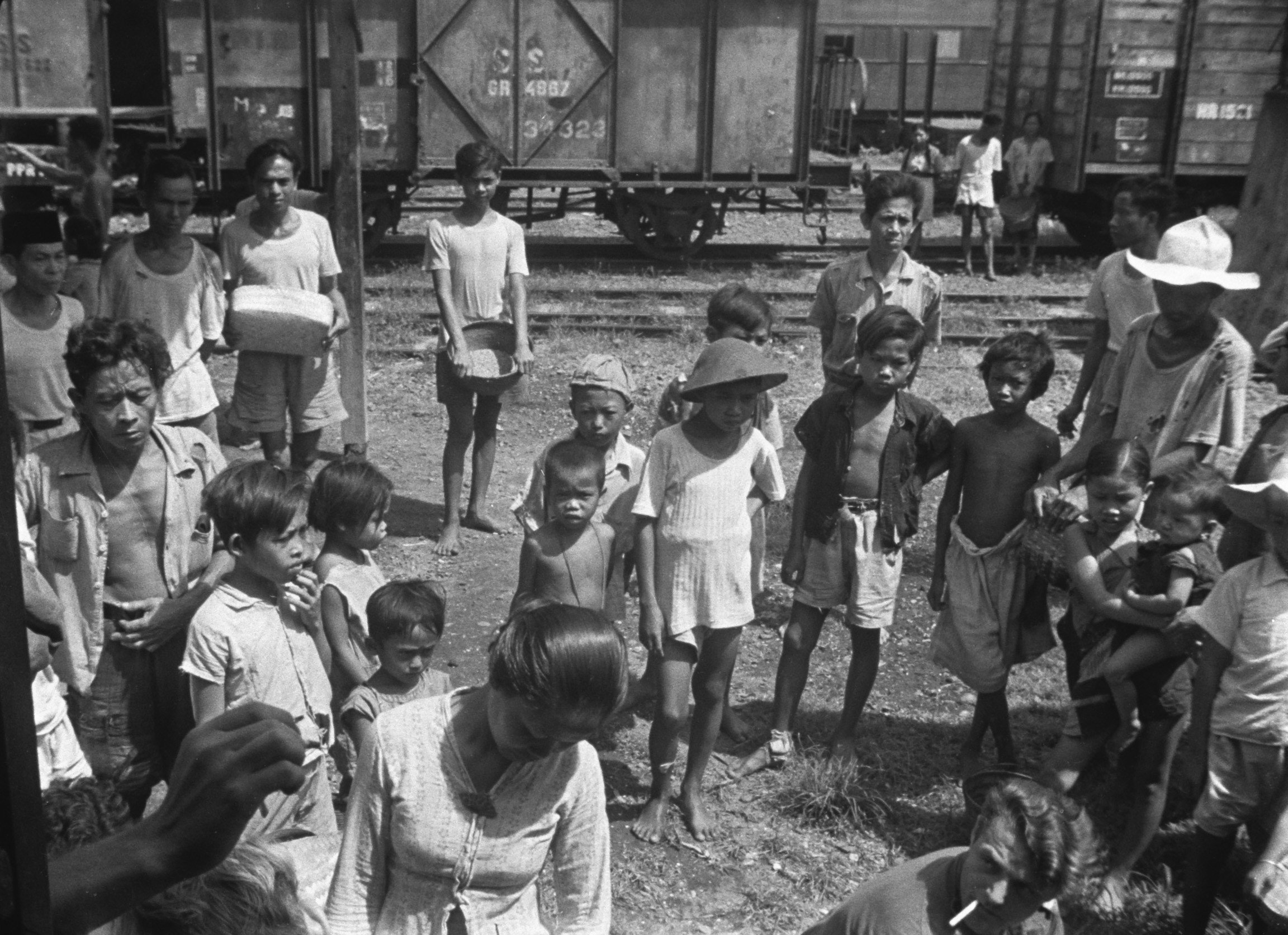
Residents of Yogyakarta await rice distribution during a food shortage following the 1948 Dutch attack on city.

In 1947, Kurnianingrat was selected as a secretary for the Indonesian delegation to the United Nations-brokered Renville negotiations with the Dutch. After Dutch forces abrogated a ceasefire agreement and captured Yogyakarta in 1948, she assisted the Indonesian resistance by allowing guerrilla fighters to use her home as a supply depot. Because the attack led to a food shortage in the city, she and other women operated clandestine "rice kitchens" to feed families who had no food reserves. She also continued teaching students in secret with other high school teachers and also conducted administrative work for the Indonesian Red Cross Society. Despite inspections by Netherlands Indies Civil Administration soldiers of her home, her clandestine activities were never exposed. By 1949, the attack had turned world opinion against the Dutch, who were then forced to release the captured Indonesian leaders and return to the negotiating table, leading to the recognition of Indonesian sovereignty in December.

=== Studies abroad and return to Indonesia ===
As part of Australia's postwar assistance package to Asian countries, the Office of Education began offering scholarships to Indonesians in 1949. Being interested in the future of education in Indonesia, Kurnianingrat applied to study educational psychology and received an endorsement from the Indonesian government. The scholarship offered to her was for a one-year study in Sydney in the subject of her choosing, so she decided to study the Australian education system. She departed for Sydney in November and was received by the Indonesian chargé d'affaires, Usman Sastroamidjojo, upon arrival. Studying under Professor William O'Neill of the University of Sydney, she visited schools throughout the country, finding few differences between Australian schools and Indonesia's Dutch schools. She was, however, surprised by the number of single-sex schools and overall sex segregation in Australian life. The New South Wales Teachers Federation made her an honorary member. Her travels also took her to Canberra, Melbourne, and Tasmania.

She returned to Indonesia in December 1950 and was warmly welcomed by education ministry officials eager to hear about her experience in Australia. She was appointed the head of a teacher training school (Sekolah Guru Atas) and tasked with transforming the Dutch school into a "republican institution". By 1951, English had replaced Dutch as the primary foreign language of the Indonesian government, and an English Language Inspectorate (Inspeksi Pengajaran Bahasa Inggeris, IPBI) was established in 1953. Kurnianingrat applied to join the inspectorate and was accepted as its deputy director. She was joined by its director, Fritz Wachendorff, and a staffer, Harumani Rudolph-Sudirdjo. IPBI enlisted the help of the British Council and the Ford Foundation in planning a syllabus for teaching English at post-primary institutions. It also managed a two-year course for training English teachers. In 1951, Australian volunteers began arriving under the Volunteer Graduate Scheme (VGS), working on assignments for the Indonesian government, including at IPBI. Kurnianingrat supervised and built friendships with some these volunteers.

IPBI disbanded in 1956, with Rudolph-Sudirdjo giving birth to her first child and Wachendorff accepting a faculty position at the University of Indonesia. Kurnianingrat traveled to the United States to study English literature and linguistics at Cornell University in Ithaca, New York after receiving a scholarship from the Ford Foundation. She spent two years at the university and completed a Master of Arts thesis on the history of William Shakespeare in Indonesia. Her thesis explored the origins of Komedi Stambul, a form of ethnic folk theatre from the late colonial period, which performed adaptations of works such as Hamlet. Upon her return, she began teaching in the English studies department at the University of Indonesia, eventually becoming the head of the department in June 1960.

The entry of English-language media in the late 1960s led to an increase in the number of Indonesians learning and using the language. Language schools teaching English and publishers releasing English textbooks flourished. Kurnianingrat, however, lamented the general low level of proficiency in English as few could afford the cost of private lessons. She received an offer from London-based Longman to publish a textbook, but she rejected it because the publisher did not want to print the author's name on the cover. A domestic publisher, Bhratara, published her textbook titled Practical Conversations in 1973. By 1974, Kurnianingrat had retired from teaching at the University of Indonesia. She taught privately in her later years, but by her 70s she would virtually lose her eyesight and could no longer write unaided. To compensate for this condition, she learned Braille.

At the encouragement of Rudolph-Sudirdjo, Kurnianingrat began writing a memoir and included drafts among letters written to historian Ailsa Thomson Zainuddin between January 1991 and June 1993. The memoir is unfinished, and only nine chapters recounting her life through her 30s were completed before she fell ill and died on 18 October 1993. She lived in Cipinang Muara, Jakarta.

== Personal life ==
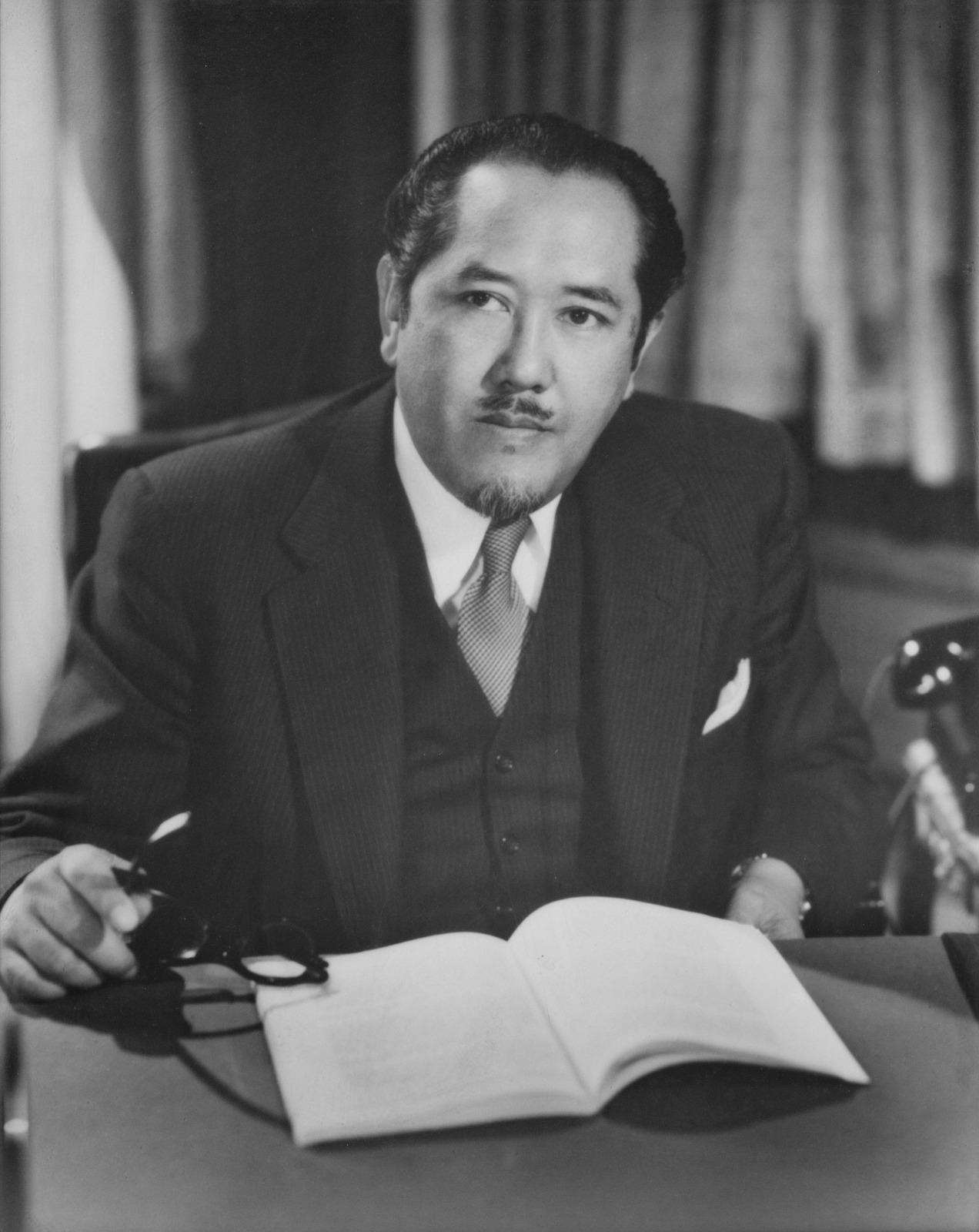
Former prime minister Ali Sastroamidjojo (1903–1975), whom Kurnianingrat married in 1970

In 1940, during Kurnianingrat's first teaching assignment in Batavia, she began a courtship with Jusuf Prawira Adiningrat, a law student. The two were introduced to each other through Toos Prawira Adiningrat, Jusuf's brother and a cousin of Kurnianingrat, with whom she had become a very close friend. During this time, she was living in the household of the patih (vice regent) of Weltevreden. As Jusuf's relationship with Kurnianingrat became more serious, he sought the permission of Kurnianingrat's father to marry her. The two became engaged following a formal proposal on his behalf by the regent and Raden Ayu of Cianjur, cousins of Jusuf. He then requested the Ministry of Education to transfer her assignment to Purwakarta, so she could be properly chaperoned. Jusuf visited her every weekend in Purwakarta, but when her family evacuated ahead of the Japanese invasion, she was forced to leave the city without him. Even after Japanese forces occupied Purwakarta, she did not hear from Jusuf, so she returned to search for him. There, she learned that he had been killed while en route to Purwakarta by villagers who had mistaken him as Chinese.

Kurnianingrat later married the widowed former prime minister Ali Sastroamidjojo, whose wife had died several years prior. They had known each other since their time in Yogyakarta—her as a teacher and him as a republican leader—and often met during state functions. In a 1949 letter to Australian consul-general Charles Eaton, Ali, in his capacity as then-Minister of Education, praised Kurnianingrat as "one of the most qualified teachers in the English language in our secondary schools", endorsing her application to study in Australia. While those who knew Ali considered him a rigid man, she saw his humorous persona and often observed the respect that the people conferred upon him as an elder statesman. She encouraged him to complete a memoir, published in 1974. In the last three months of his life, Ali suffered from a lung disease. The two were married from 1970 until his death in 1975.

== Legacy ==
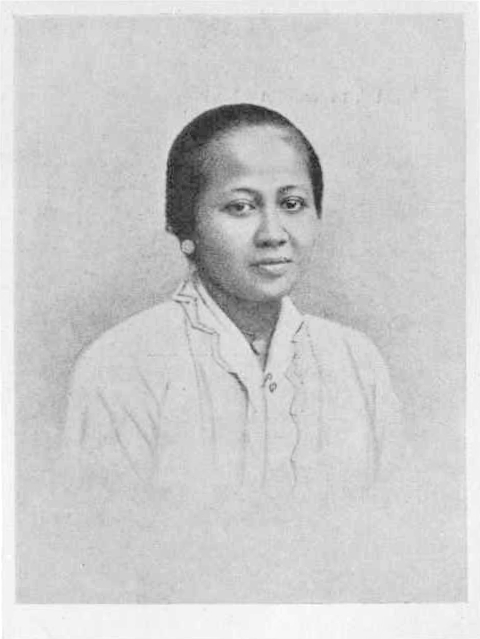
Kartini (1879–1904), pioneer of women's rights and education, whom Zainuddin compared to Kurnianingrat

Historian Ailsa Thomson Zainuddin viewed Kurnianingrat as a modern-day Kartini, the 19th-century Javanese aristocrat and advocate of women's education and emancipation. Kurnianingrat confessed in her later years that she had "learned to appreciate Kartini much more" through Zainuddin's writings. In an unpublished article written in 1980, she compared her own upbringing with Kartini's:

I was born in an environment similar to that of Kartini, pioneer of women's emancipation in Indonesia, but forty years later. In the 1920s, the kabupaten no longer confined girls within its walls; it was a centre from which youngsters went forth to pursue their studies. Many cousins of mine, boys as well as girls, came to live in the kabupaten and we grew up together as equals. Never were the girls made to feel that the boys were superior and the younger did not have to humble themselves before the older. Whereas Kartini craved the opportunity to get Western schooling, we were encouraged to learn as much as possible about Western culture.

During her time in Yogyakarta, Kurnianingrat was a witness to the events of the Indonesian National Revolution and regularly interacted with its leading figures, including President Sukarno and her future husband, Ali Sastroamidjojo. Historian Jean Gelman Taylor described her life as being "intimately connected with the creation of Indonesia". Her home in Gondokusuman regularly hosted visitors, family members, friends, and eventual refugees of Dutch military offensives. She formed friendships with Indonesian Red Cross official Paramita Abdurachman and American historian George McTurnan Kahin (then still a doctoral student). Later, she prevented Dutch authorities from seizing copies of speeches by Sukarno, Mohammad Hatta, and Mohammad Natsir—prepared for broadcasting in case of a Dutch attack on Yogyakarta—and helped Kahin smuggle them out of Indonesia. Among her students in Yogyakarta were future ministers of education, Daoed Joesoef and Nugroho Notosusanto.

Australian scholar Herbert Feith, his wife, Betty, and Zainuddin were lifelong friends of Kurnianingrat. Feith arrived in indonesia in 1951 and was Australia's first volunteer in Indonesia. His wife and Zainuddin followed in July 1954 and worked at IPBI, where Kurnianingrat was deputy director, for eighteen months. Kurnianingrat's experience working with these three individuals made her an early supporter of the Australia's volunteers. Though conscious the pitfalls of international volunteering—paternalism exhibited by the sending country and poor understanding of local needs—she wrote in a 1959 opinion piece, "I can only say that I have a deep appreciation for the Volunteer Graduate Scheme and the way it tries to establish friendly relations with Indonesia."

== Works ==
- Kurnianingrat (9 June 1950). "Education In Indonesia". Education: Journal of the New South Wales Teachers' Federation. 31 (8). Sydney: N.S.W. Teachers' Federation: 4. OCLC 220329934.
- Kurnianingrat (1958). An Essay Towards a History of Shakespeare in Indonesia (MA thesis). Cornell University. OCLC 1198052.
- Kurnianingrat; Rudolph, Harumani (1985) [1973]. Practical Conversations: A Guide to English Use. Jakarta: Bhratara Karya Aksara.
