= Letters of a Javanese Princess =

Dutch-language book of collected letters by Kartini

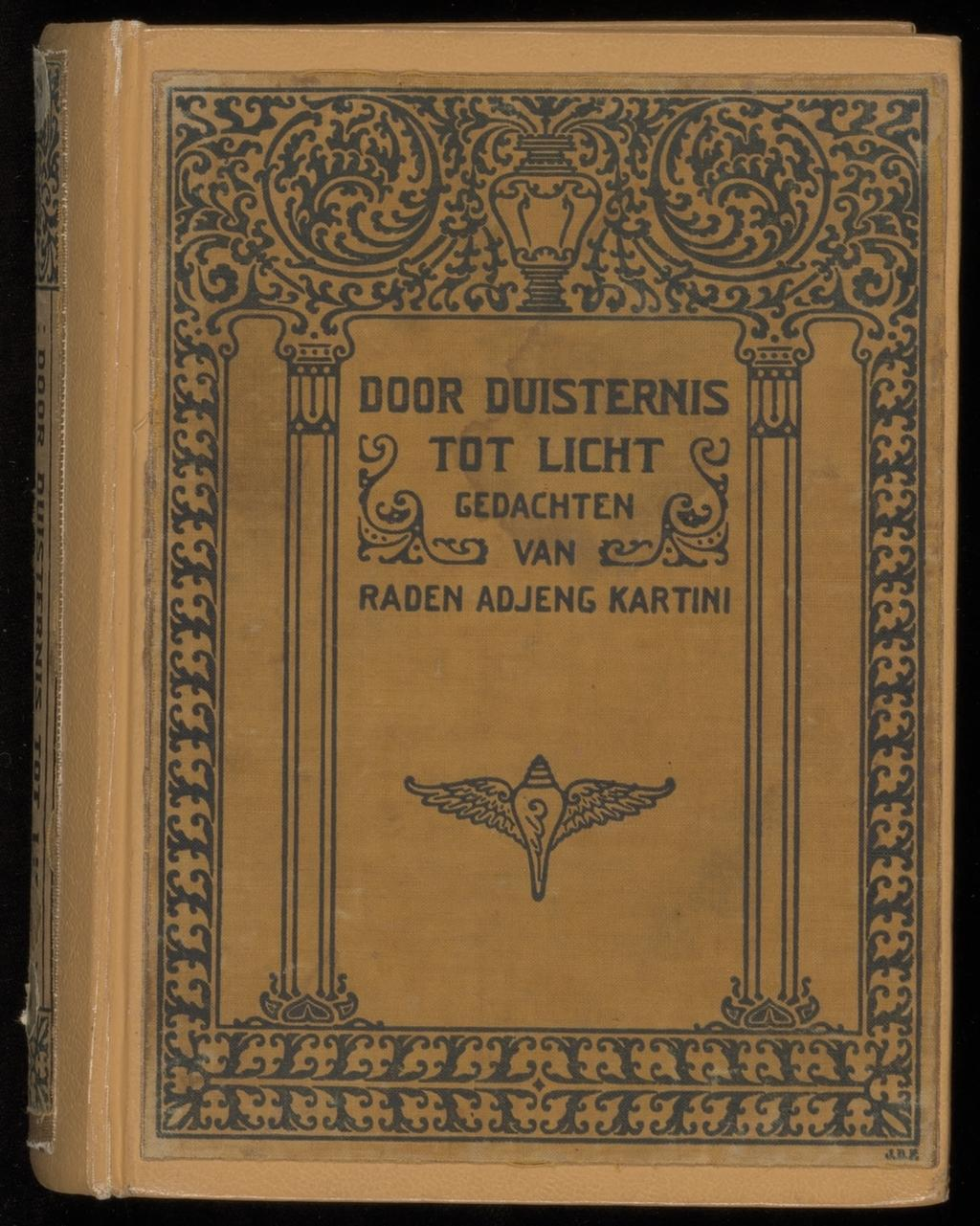
- Cover of the first edition (1911)
- Author: Kartini
- Original title: Door duisternis tot licht: Gedachten over en voor het Javaansche volk
- Translator: Agnes Louise Symmers (English, 1919); Bagindo Dahlan Abdullah, Zainudin Rasad, Sutan Muhammad Zain, and Djamaloedin Rasad (Malay, 1922); Armijn Pane (Malay, 1938); Louis Charles Damais (French, 1960)
- Language: Dutch language
- Publisher: G. C. T. van Dorp
- Publication date: 1911 (first edition)
- Publication place: Dutch East Indies
- English publication date: 1920

Letters of a Javanese Princess (Dutch: Door duisternis tot licht: Gedachten over en voor het Javaansche volk; 'Through darkness to light: Thoughts about and for the Javanese people'; Indonesian/Malay: Habis Gelap Terbitlah Terang; 'After Darkness Comes Light') is a posthumous book of letters by the Dutch East Indies women's rights activist and intellectual Kartini. The letters, which were written in Dutch, reveal Kartini's views on society and modern life, and were collected by one of Kartini's correspondents Jacques Henrij Abendanon and published in 1911. They have since been translated into a number of other languages, including an English language version in 1920 and a Malay language version published by Balai Pustaka in 1922. The book became an important symbol both for liberal Dutch colonial policy (the Dutch Ethical Policy) and for Indonesian nationalism.

== History ==
Kartini (1879–1904) was the daughter of an aristocratic Javanese family from Jepara. Unusually for the time, she was schooled in the Dutch language and read, wrote and corresponded extensively as a youth living in aristocratic seclusion. She had hoped to leave home to obtain further education, but was denied by her family, since it was unheard of at that time. Therefore she was mostly self-educated, and soon became very well-informed on colonial politics, modern issues, and was an admirer of Abdoel Rivai. The letters she wrote, which were written between 1899 and 1904, were addressed to around ten Europeans whom she mostly met in Java, including the Indies Minister of Education Jacques Henrij Abendanon and his wife Rosa Abendanon, Nellie van Kol (wife of the politician Henri van Kol), Marie Ovink-Soer (wife of the Resident of Jepara) and so on. In the letters she discusses her views on politics and culture, her family life, and her relationships.

After her untimely death in 1904 at the age of 25, J. H. Abendanon began to collect letters Kartini had written to him and other Europeans. Selected letters were edited by Abendanon and published by G. C. T. van Dorp in 1911, both in Java and in The Hague, under Abendanon's evocative title Through darkness to light. The book sold very well and several more printings were issued in the 1910s; Abendanon used some of the proceeds to found girls' schools in the Indies.

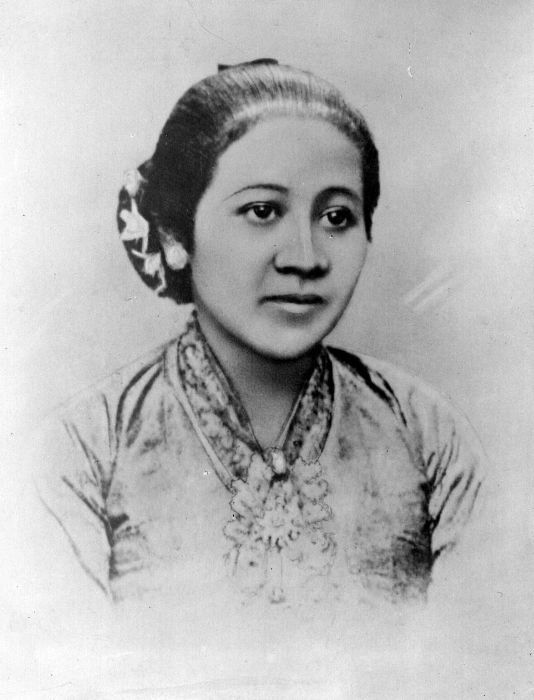
Portrait of Kartini

Because of its popularity, the book was eventually translated and published in other languages. Starting in late 1919 some letters were translated into English and serialized in Atlantic Monthly; by 1921 these were published in book form by Knopf under a new title, Letters of a Javanese Princess. At Abendanon's request, in 1922 the book was published in Malay translation by the colonial printing house Balai Pustaka; it was a group effort by Empat Saudara (Bagindo Dahlan Abdullah, Zainudin Rasad, Sutan Muhammad Zain, dan Djamaloedin Rasad). A fourth Dutch edition in 1924 had an expanded text by Abendanon in which he described the advances of girls' education in the Indies since Kartini's death.

== Significance and legacy ==
The publication of the book, and its subsequent commercial success, turned Kartini into a household name in the Indies and in the Netherlands. She became a symbol of the Dutch Ethical Policy to liberal Europeans and of the Indonesian National Awakening to Indonesian nationalists. The tension between these two uses of her ideas can be seen in Abendanon's foreword to the first edition, in which he praised Kartini's progressive ideals but also warned that lofty ideals can be dangerous. Abendanon heavily edited Kartini's letters, for example to remove references to polygamy from her family life. The English editions also excluded some of the letters from the 1911 book, downplaying her criticism of European colonialism and paternalism. Meanwhile the 1922 Malay edition, promoted heavily by the colonial education system, popularized Kartini and her ideas among Indonesians.

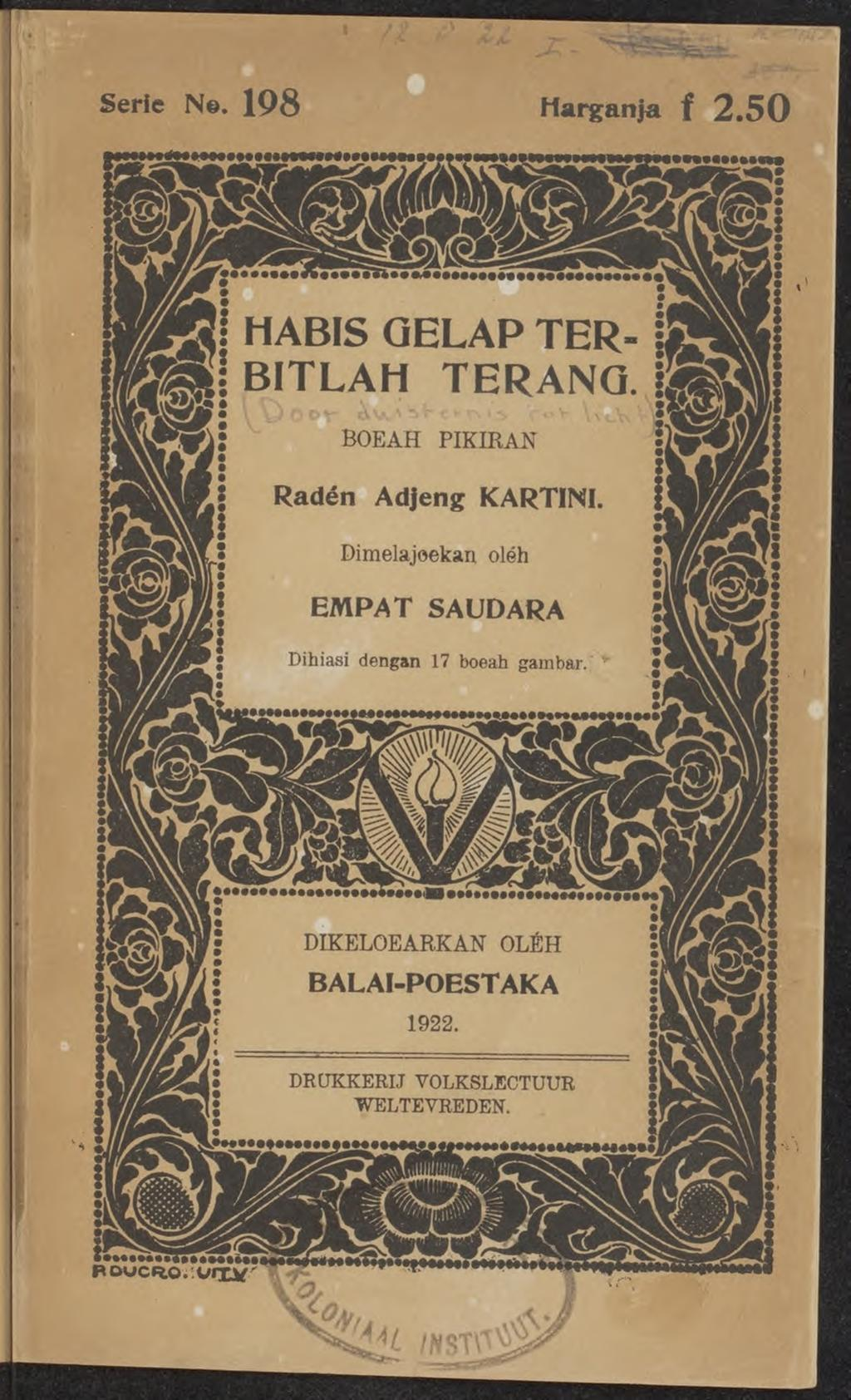
Cover of 1st Malay edition Habis Gelap Terbitlah Terang (1922)

For the next several decades, Kartini and this book became almost unknown outside the Indies/Indonesia and the Netherlands. There were nonetheless many new translations in other languages, including an Arabic version in 1925, Sundanese in 1930, Javanese in 1938 and Japanese in 1955. It was only in the late 1950s that UNESCO took interest in her and her writings, and supported the creation of new editions. The first was a French language translation by Louis-Charles Damais with a foreword by Orientalist Louis Massignon, published in 1960, and in 1964 a reprint of Symmers' 1920 translation with a foreword by Eleanor Roosevelt. At around this time Indonesian writers also took new interest in Kartini, including Pramoedya Ananta Toer and the journalist Soeroto. It was only in the late 1980s, after Abendanon's descendants donated Kartini's archive to the Royal Netherlands Institute of Southeast Asian and Caribbean Studies, that many of the original letters became available to scholars and started to be published and re-translated. The most complete version is currently the English translation by Joost Coté published in 2014 (Kartini: The Complete Writings 1898-1904 ).

== Selected editions and translations ==
- Door duisternis tot licht: gedachten over en voor het Javaansche volk / van wijlen Raden Adjeng Kartini; [verz. en ingel. door J.H. Abendanon]. (first Dutch edition, G. C. T. van Dorp, 1911)
- Letters of a Javanese princess / by Raden Adjeng Kartini; transl. from the Dutch by Agnes Louise Symmers; with a forew. by Louis Couperus. (first English translation, Knopf, New York, 1920 and Duckworth Books, London, 1921)
- Habis gelap terbitlah terang: boeah pikiran / Radén Adjeng Kartini; dimelajoekan oléh empat saudara; dengan pendahoeloean daripada J.H. Abendanon (first Malay edition, Balai Pustaka, Weltevreden (Batavia), 1922)
- Lettres de Raden Adjeng Kartini: Java en 1900 / choisies et trad. par Louis Charles Damais; introd. et notes de Jeanne Cuisinier; préf. de Louis Massignon (Mouton de Gruyter, Paris, 1960)
- Raden Adjeng Kartini: letters of a Javanese princess / transl. from the Dutch by Agnes Louise Symmers; ed. and with an introd. by Hildred Geertz; pref. by Eleanor Roosevelt. (Norton, New York, 1964)
- Letters of a Javanese princess (shortened English edition, Oxford University Press, 1976)
- Door duisternis tot licht: gedachten over en voor het Javaanse volk (1976 reprint, Nabrink, Amsterdam)
