= Education in Indonesia =

Ministry of Primary and Secondary Education Ministry of Higher Education, Science, and Technology Ministry of Religious Affairs
- Minister of Primary and Secondary Education Minister of Higher Education, Science, and Technology Minister of Religious Affairs: Abdul Mu'ti Brian Yuliarto Nasaruddin Umar

National education budget (2017)
- Budget: IDR 416.1 trillion USD 31.2 billion

General details
- Primary languages: Indonesian
- System type: Curriculum
- Merdeka Curriculum: 4 February 2022

Literacy (2018)
- Total: 95.66%
- Male: 97.33%
- Female: 93.99%

Enrollment (2018)
- Total: (N/A)
- Primary: 93.5%
- Secondary: 78.73%
- Post secondary: 36.31%

Interpolated median educational attainment of Indonesia by district (2022)

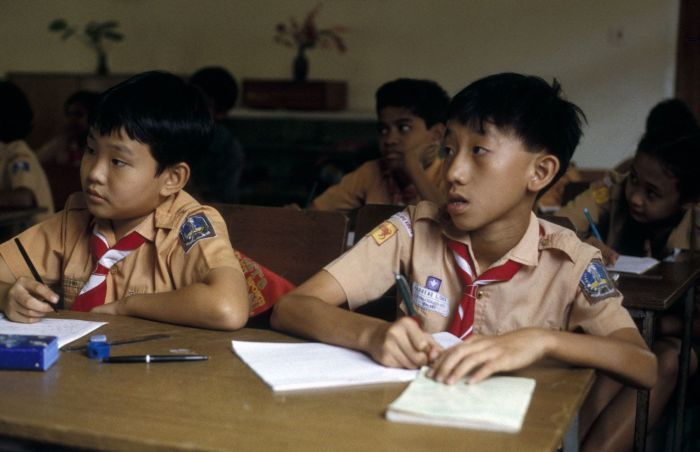
Students wearing the pramuka (scout) uniform studying. This uniform is usually worn on either Wednesday, Thursday, Friday or Saturday.

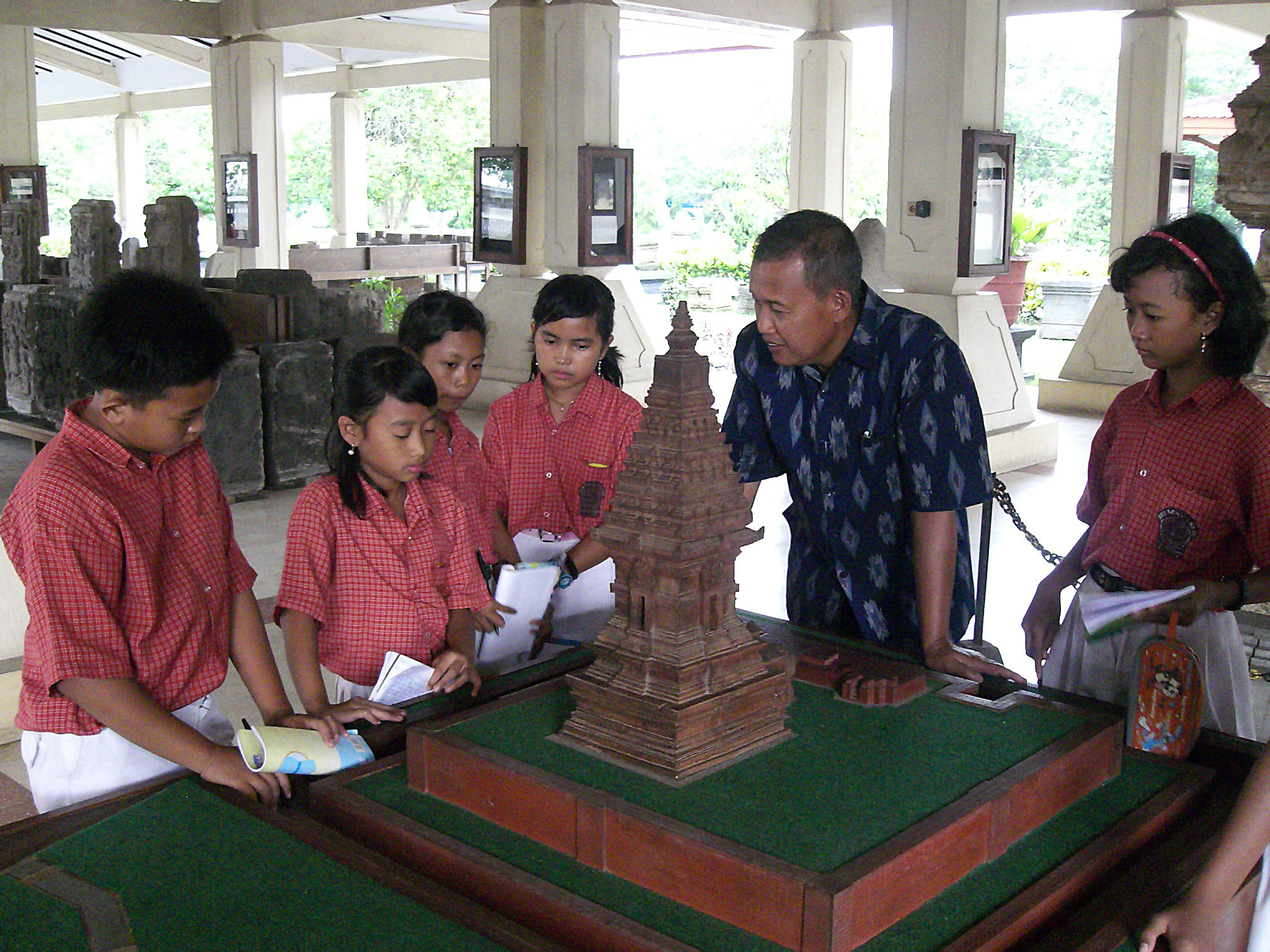
The students pictured above are listening to a guide at the Trowulan Museum, East Java whilst examining a model of the Jawi temple.

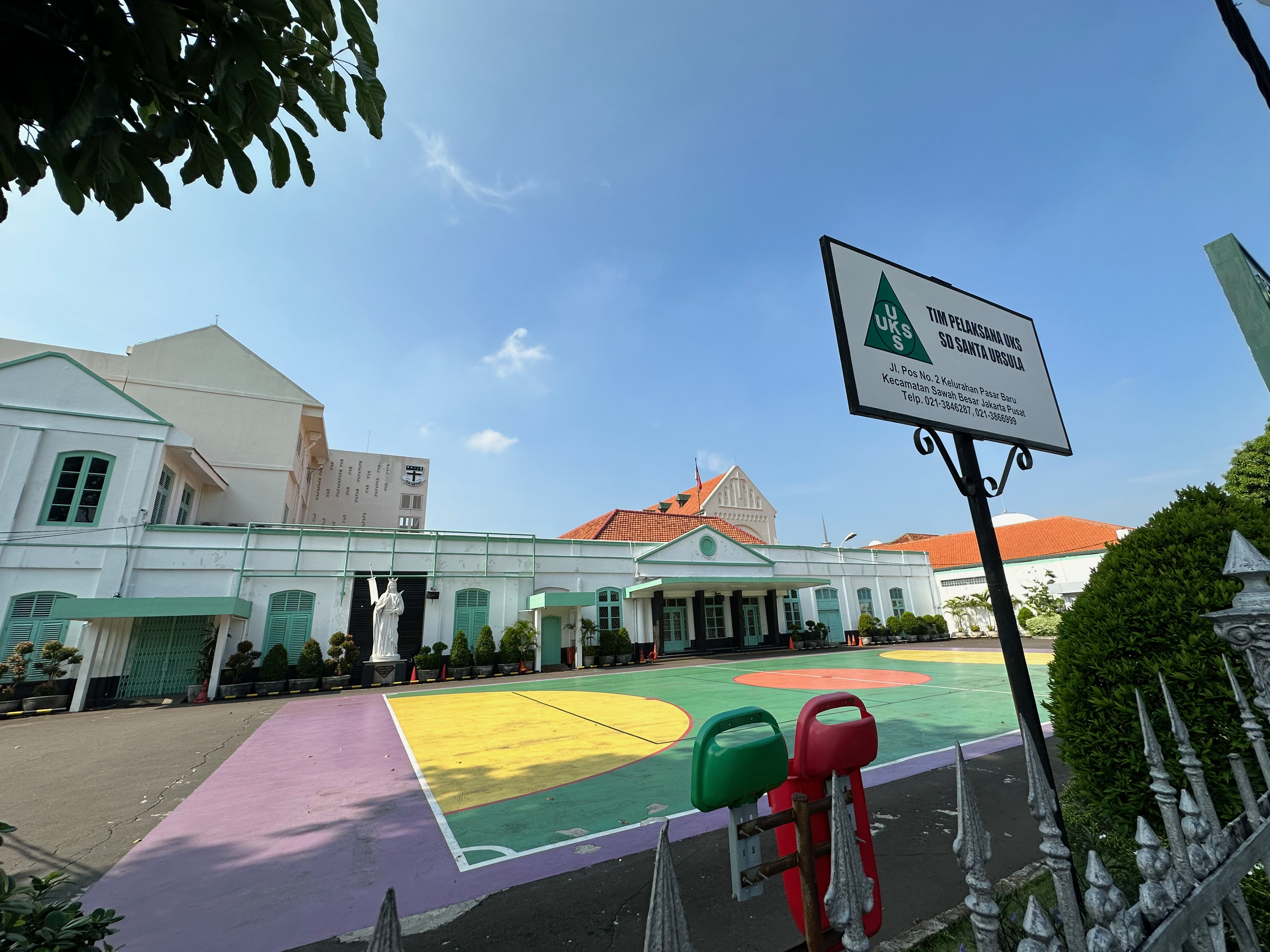
Santa Ursula Catholic School in Jakarta

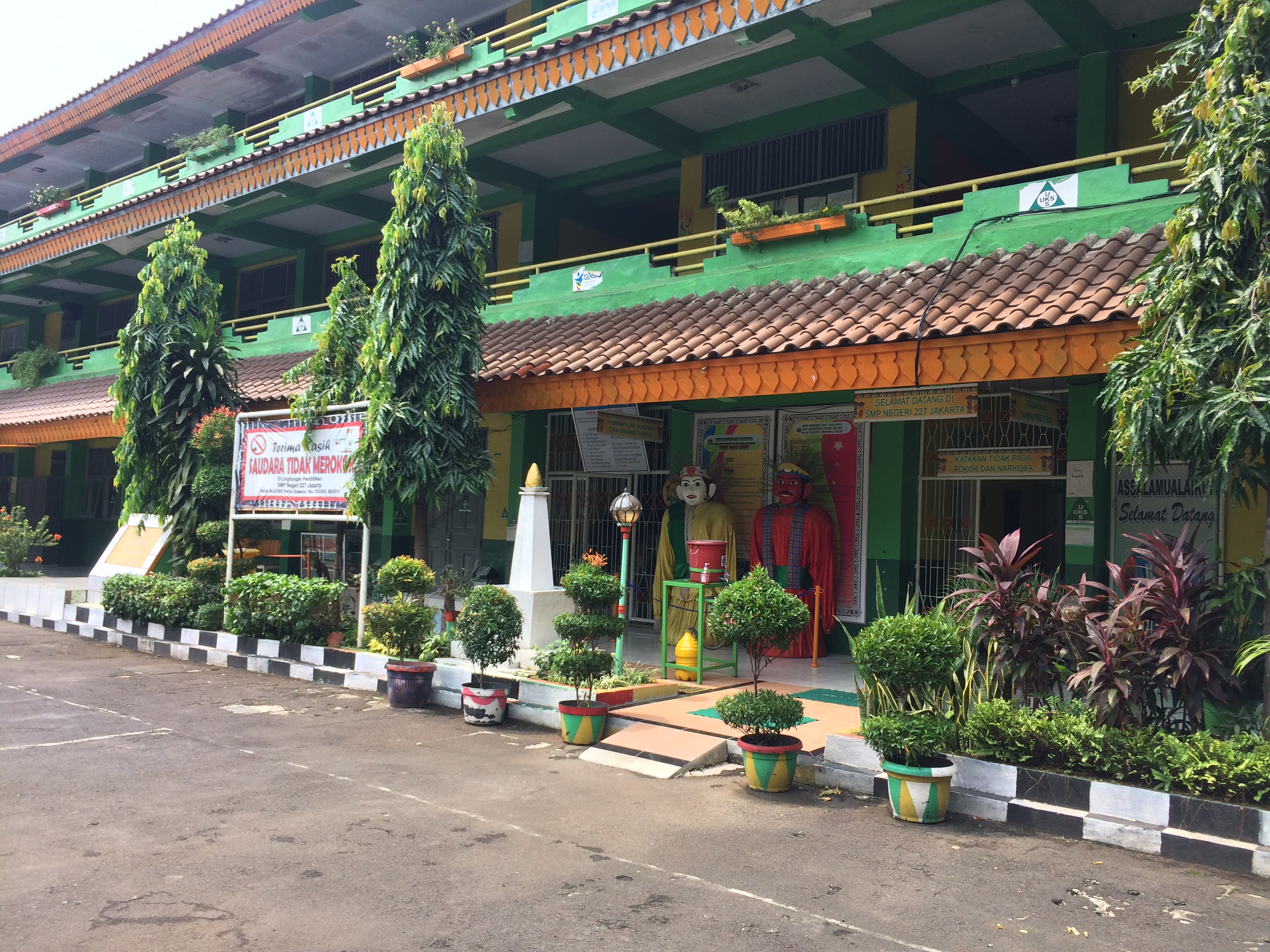
A typical public school in Jakarta

Education in Indonesia falls under the responsibility of the Ministry of Primary and Secondary Education (Kementerian Pendidikan Dasar dan Menengah, or Kemendikdasmen), the Ministry of Higher Education, Science, and Technology (Kementerian Pendidikan Tinggi, Sains, dan Teknologi, or Kemendikti Saintek), and the Ministry of Religious Affairs (Kementerian Agama, or Kemenag). In Indonesia, all citizens must undertake twelve years of compulsory education. This consists of six years at the elementary level and three years each at the middle and high school levels. Islamic, Christian, Hindu, Buddhist, and Confucian schools are under the responsibility of the Ministry of Religious Affairs.

Education is defined by Indonesia's 2003 National Education System Law as a conscious and planned effort to create a learning environment and process so that students can actively develop their potential. The law recognises three educational pathways: formal, non-formal, and informal. Formal education is structured and tiered and comprises basic, secondary, and higher education. Non-formal education is provided outside formal education and may be structured and tiered, while informal education is provided through family and the environment.

Schools in Indonesia are run either by the government (negeri) or the private sector (swasta). Some private schools refer to themselves as "national plus schools", which means that their curriculum exceeds the requirements set by the Ministry of Education, especially by using English as the medium of instruction or having an international-based curriculum instead of the national one. In Indonesia, there are approximately 170,000 primary schools, 40,000 junior-secondary schools, and 26,000 high schools. Eighty-four percent of these schools are under the Ministry of Education and Culture, and the remaining sixteen percent under the Ministry of Religious Affairs.

== School system overview ==
The Indonesian education system is the fourth largest in the world, with more than fifty million students, three million teachers, and 300,000 schools. The compulsory education system is divided into three levels: primary school, junior high school, and senior high school. Primary school and junior high school are free, while senior high school requires a fee. In 2018, the net enrolment rates for primary school, junior high school, and senior high school were 93.5%, 78.84%, and 60.67%, respectively. Tertiary education participation is low at 36.31%. In 2011, the completion rates for primary school, junior high school, and senior high school were 95.3%, 97.68%, and 96.8%, respectively.

Indonesian students can choose between state-run, non-sectarian public schools supervised by the Ministry of Education, Culture, Research, and Technology (Kemendikbudristek) and private or semi-private religious (usually Islamic) schools supervised and financed by the Ministry of Religious Affairs. Although 86.1% of the Indonesian population is registered as Muslim, only fifteen percent of school-age individuals attended religious schools according to the 2000 census. Overall enrolment figures are slightly higher for girls than for boys, and Java has higher enrolment figures than the rest of Indonesia.

A central goal of the national education system is to impart secular knowledge about the world and to instruct children in the principles of participation in the modern nation-state, its bureaucracies, and its moral and ideological foundations. Beginning under the Guided Democracy period and strengthening in the New Order after 1975, a key feature of the national curriculum was the instruction in Pancasila. Children aged six and older learned its five principles by rote—belief in one God, humanitarianism, national unity, democracy, and social justice—and were instructed daily to apply the meanings of this key national symbol to their lives. With the end of the New Order in 1998 and the beginning of the campaign to decentralise the national government, provincial- and district-level administrators obtained increasing autonomy in determining the content of schooling, and the role of Pancasila in the curriculum began to diminish.

Public-school pedagogy emphasises rote learning and deference to the authority of the teacher. Teachers customarily do not ask questions of individual students; rather, they typically narrate a historical event or describe a mathematical problem, pausing at key junctures to allow students to call out responses that "fill in the blanks". By not identifying individual problems of students and retaining an emotionally distanced demeanour, teachers are said to demonstrate patience, which is admired in Indonesian culture.

== History ==
=== Islamic kingdoms period ===
The emergence of the Islamic state in Indonesia is marked by the acculturation of Islamic and Hindu-Buddhist traditions. During this period, the pondok pesantren, a type of Islamic boarding school, was introduced. Pesantren are typically located far from the hustle and bustle of cities, resembling the location of Karsyan.

=== Dutch colonial period ===
Elementary education was introduced in Indonesia by the Dutch during the colonial era. The Dutch education system was a series of educational branches based on the social status of the colony's population, with the best available institutions reserved for the European population.

In 1870, with the development of the Dutch Ethical Policy formulated by Conrad Theodor van Deventer, some of these Dutch-founded schools opened the doors to Pribumi (native Indonesians). They were called Sekolah Rakjat (folk schools), the predecessor of what is now called Sekolah Dasar (elementary school). In 1871, the Dutch parliament adopted a new education law that sought to standardise the highly scattered and diversified indigenous education systems across the archipelago and expand the number of teacher-training schools under the supervision of the colonial administration. The public school budget was increased in stages from approximately 300,000 guilders in 1864 to roughly 3 million guilders by the early 1890s. Educational development often lacked funding because many Dutch politicians feared that expanding education would eventually lead to anti-colonial sentiment. Funding for education accounted for six percent of the total expenditure of the colonial budget in the 1920s. The number of government and private primary schools for natives had increased to 3,108, and libraries to 3,000 by 1930. However, spending sharply declined after the economic depression in 1930.

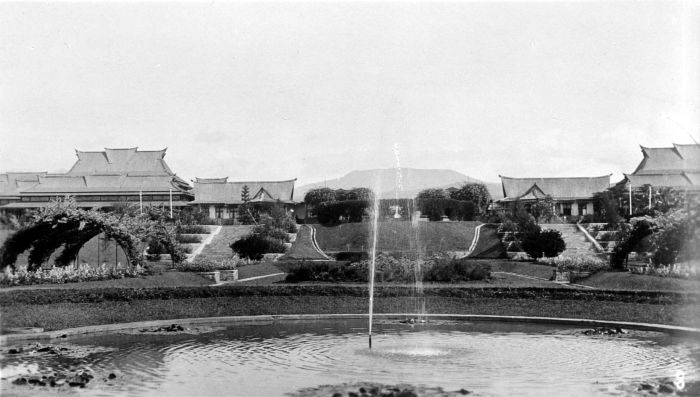
Technische Hogeschool te Bandoeng, opened as a branch of Delft University of Technology.

The Dutch introduced a system of formal education for the local population of Indonesia, although this was restricted to certain privileged children. The schools for the Europeans were modelled on the Dutch education system and required proficiency in Dutch. Dutch was also needed for higher education enrolment. Elite native and Chinese populations who lacked Dutch language skills could enrol in either Dutch Native or Chinese schools. The schools were arranged in the following levels:

- ELS (Dutch: Europeesche Lagereschool "European Low School") – primary school for Europeans
- HSS (Dutch: Hollandsch-Schakelschool "Dutch-Switch School")
- HIS (Dutch: Hollandsch-Inlandscheschool "Dutch-Native School") – primary school for natives
- HCS (Dutch: Hollandsch-Chinescheschool "Dutch-Chinese School") – primary school for Chinese
- MULO (Dutch: Meer Uitgebreid Lager Onderwijs "More Advanced Low Education") – middle school
- AMS (Dutch: Algemene Middelbareschool "General Middle School") – high school or college
- HBS (Dutch: Hogere Burgerschool "Higher Citizen School") – pre-university

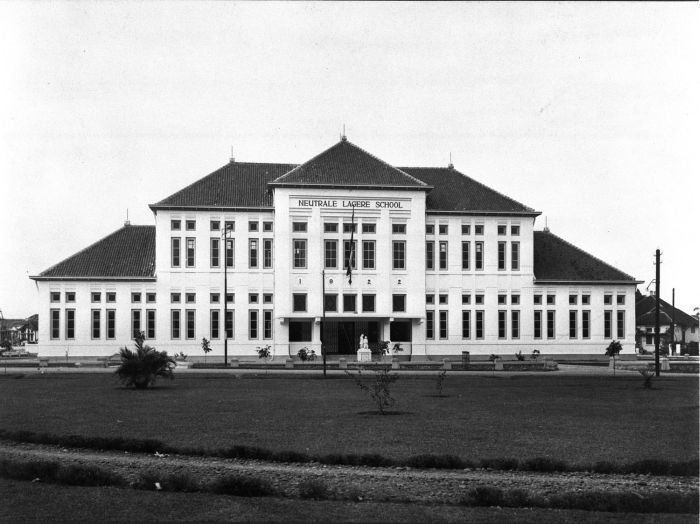
Neutrale Lagere School in Malang.

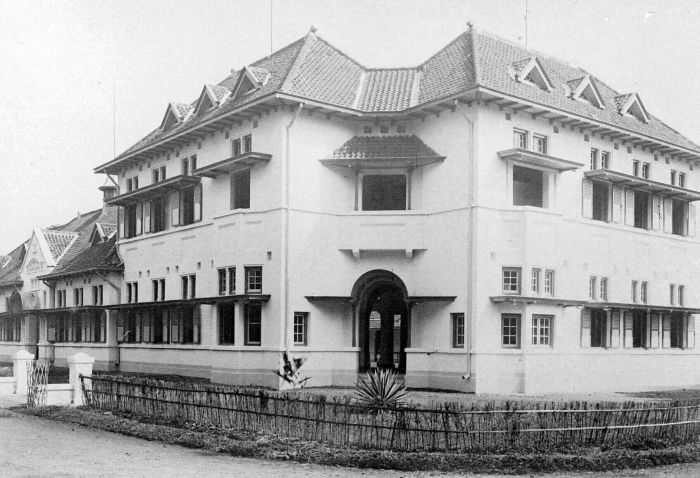
Kartini School in Bogor.

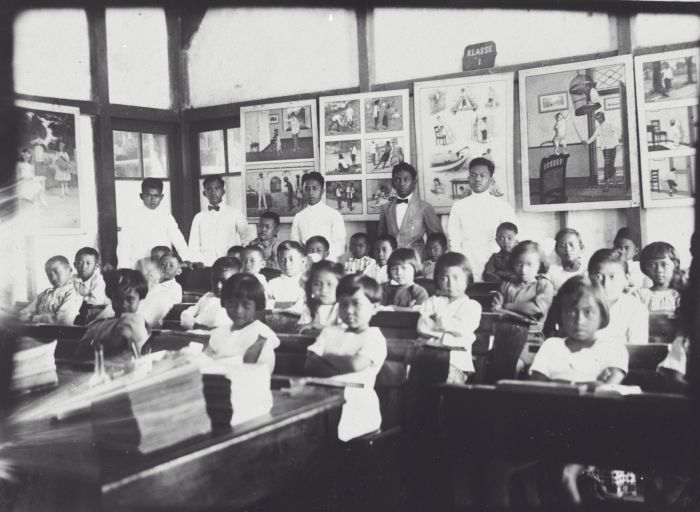
Inside a classroom of the Dutch Native School in Bandung.

For the rural population, the Dutch created the Desa Schools, or village school system, which aimed to spread literacy among the native population. These schools provided two or three years of training in vernacular subjects (reading, writing, ciphering, hygiene, animals and plants, etc.) and served as cheaper alternative schools. These village schools received far less funding than the European schools; thus the quality of education provided is often lacking. Despite its flaws, the number of village schools increased to 17,695 by 1930. The rest of rural education was left to Christian missionaries, who were considered more cost-efficient.

The segregation between Dutch and Indonesian people in education led several Indonesian figures to establish educational institutions for local people. Arab Indonesians founded Jamiat Kheir in 1905; Ahmad Dahlan founded Muhammadiyah in November 1912; and Ki Hajar Dewantara founded Taman Siswa in July 1922 to promote the emancipation the native population. The number of pesantren grew rapidly during this period.

During the colonial period, there was a large gap between the educated male and female populations. In 1920, on the islands of Java and Madura, 6.5% of the male native population were literate compared with only 0.5% of the female native population. A similar phenomenon could be observed in the Arab and Chinese populations, with 26.5% of the male population being literate and only 8.5% of the female population being literate. In the outer islands beyond Java, the literacy rates for the male and female populations were 12% and 3% respectively. Inspired by Javanese-born aristocrat Kartini, who died at the age of 25, the Van Deventer family worked to increase female involvement in education and received support from the Dutch government—eventually leading to the foundation of Kartini Schools in 1911.

In 1920, the Dutch founded the Bandung Institute of Technology, Indonesia's first university-level educational institution, as well as other universities and colleges for native Indonesians on the island of Java. Most of these universities have become the country's top educational institutions. These institutions are as follows:

- School tot Opleiding van Inlandsche Artsen (STOVIA), a medical university which later became Geneeskundige Hogeschool in Batavia.
- Nederland-Indische Artsen School (NIAS), a medical school in Soerabaja.
- Rechts-Hoge-School, a law school in Weltevreden, Batavia.
- De Technische Hoge-School (THS), a technical school in Bandoeng and the first full-fledged university in the country (opened in 1920).
- Middelbare Landbouw-school, an agricultural college which later became Landbouwkundige Faculteit in Buitenzorg.
- Opleiding-School voor Inlandsche Ambtenaren (OSVIA), colleges for training native civil servants.
- Hollandsche-Indische Kweek-school, colleges for training teachers.

By the 1930s, the Dutch had introduced limited formal education to nearly every province of the Dutch East Indies, although by this period only 7.4% of the population were literate in 1931, and 2% were fluent in Dutch. Around the outer islands beyond Java, to meet demand for schooling, the Dutch government relied heavily on missionary schools that provided a basic education.

=== Japanese occupation ===
During the Japanese occupation in World War II, the operations of the Dutch education system were consolidated into a single system that paralleled the Japanese education system. These schools were organized with the goal of creating the Greater East Asia Co-Prosperity Sphere of influence and trained students in military and physical drills that were anti-Western in orientation. The new curriculum also included the indoctrination of Japanese culture and history, such as requiring students to raise the Japanese flag and bow to the Emperor every morning. The Japanese made schools less stratified; despite this, enrolment shrank by thirty percent for primary education and ninety percent for secondary education by 1945.

=== Post-independence ===
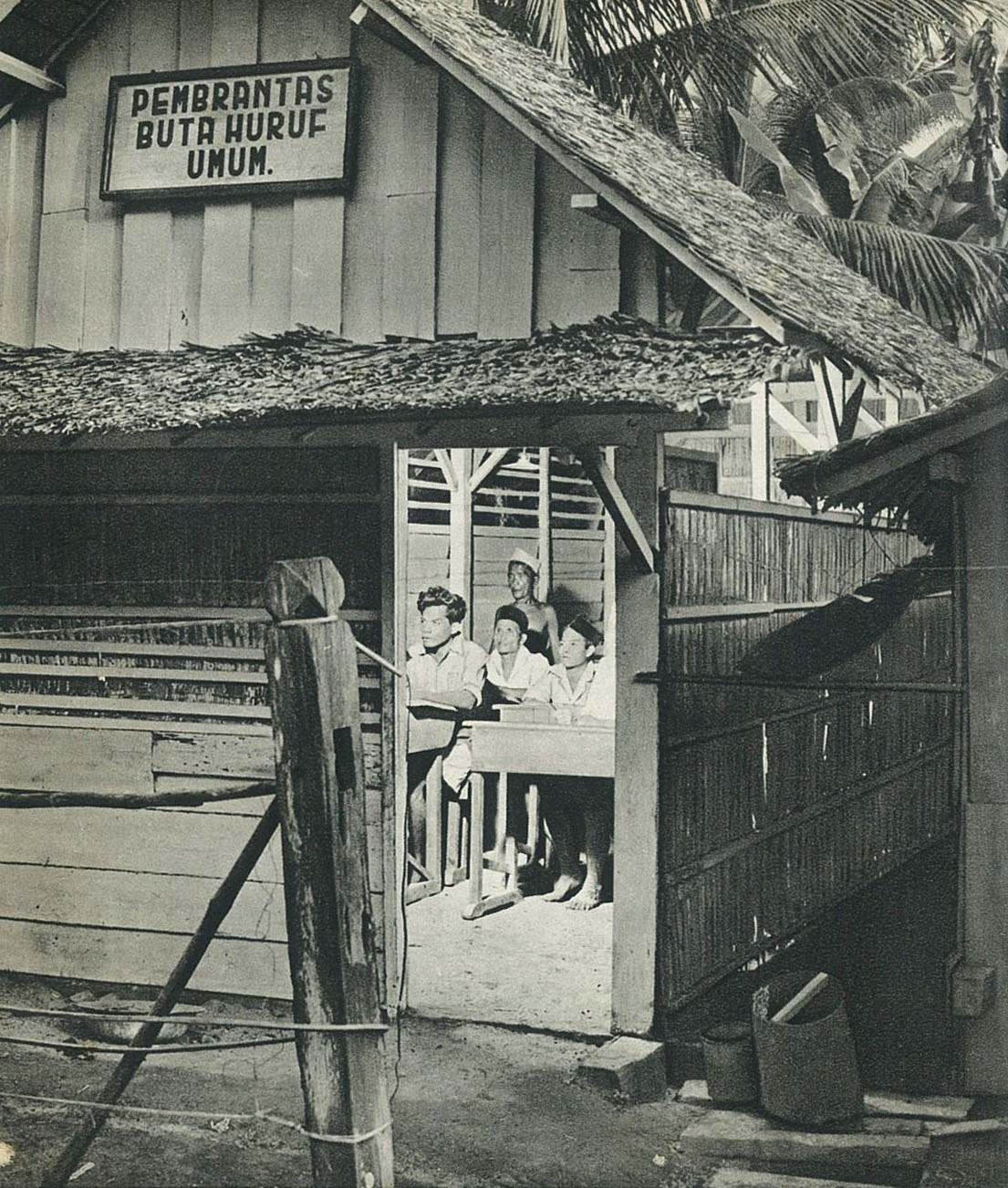
A schoolhouse in Kalimantan for eradicating adult illiteracy, c. 1952

After Indonesia declared its independence in 1945, the surviving education system was fragile and unorganised. There was a shortage of teachers, as most of them had been Dutch or Japanese. Very few Indonesians had experience in managing schools.

The first government of Indonesia had to create a system from scratch and reject the colonial European system. Chapter XIII, Article 31(1) of the 1945 Constitution states that every citizen has the right to education. Article 31(2) also requires citizens to undertake basic education, with the government providing the funding. The Ministry of Education, Instruction and Culture was founded with its first minister, Soewandi. The new institution sought to create an education system that was anti-discriminatory, anti-elitist, and anti-capitalist, to promote nationalism in the new republic of Indonesia. It was also decided that religion deserved a proper place and attention under the new republic, resulting in increased support for pesantren and Islamic madrasah.

In 1961, 46.7% of the population were literate.

By 2008, the staff shortage in Indonesia's schools was no longer as acute as in the 1980s, but serious difficulties remained, particularly in the areas of teacher salaries, teacher certification, and finding qualified personnel. In many remote areas of the outer islands, there is a severe shortage of qualified teachers, and some villages have school buildings but no teachers, books, or supplies.

== Early education ==
Pre-school education in Indonesia is known as PAUD (Pendidikan Anak Usia Dini, lit. Early Childhood Education). The Ministry of Primary and Secondary Education's data portal defines PAUD as education for children from birth to age six that supports their physical and spiritual development and prepares them for further education. It distinguishes PAUD as an educational unit from PAUD as a programme or service; units may provide playgroup and day-care programmes, while community learning centres may also provide PAUD services. It includes Taman Bermain (playgroup) and Taman Kanak-Kanak (kindergarten, abbreviated TK).

Children attend Taman Bermain at the age of two and TK at the age of four. Most TKs arrange classes into two grades, A and B, which are informally called kelas nol kecil (little zero grade) and kelas nol besar (big zero grade), respectively. While this level of education is not compulsory, its aim is to prepare children for primary schooling. Of the 49,000 kindergartens in Indonesia, 99.35% are privately operated.

== Public primary and secondary education ==
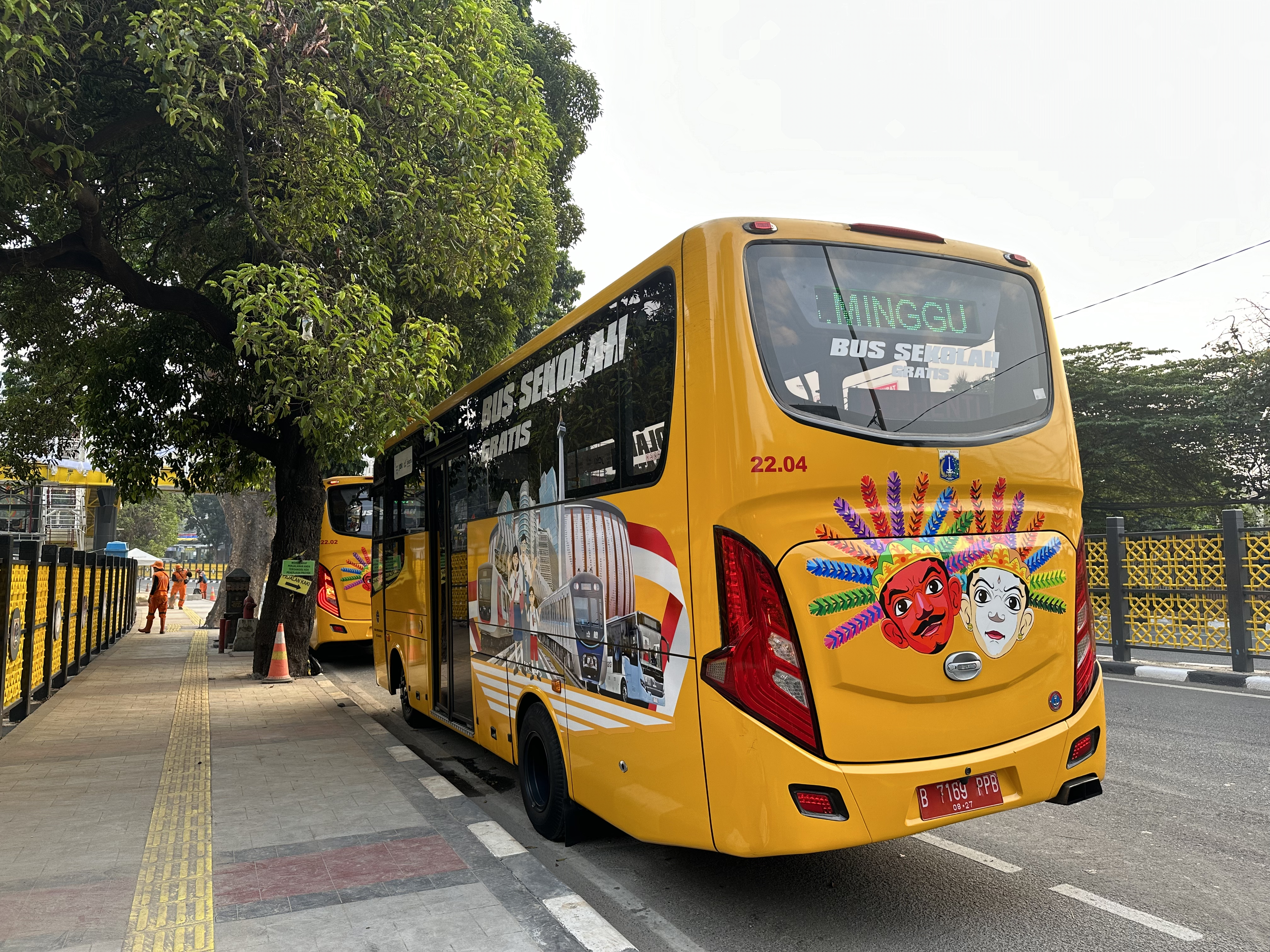
School buses for Jakartan students, free to ride as long as one is wearing school uniform

A group of middle school's students

Children aged six to twelve attend primary school, called Sekolah Dasar (SD). As of 2014, most elementary schools are government-operated public schools, accounting for 90.29% of all elementary schools in Indonesia. Students generally spend six years in primary school but may finish in five through an accelerated learning programme. Although the youngest children are sometimes allowed to use their local language, nearly all instruction is conducted in Indonesian by the third year of primary school.

Three years (or two through an accelerated learning programme) of junior high school (Sekolah Menengah Pertama, or SMP) follow elementary school. Specialised options include academic and vocational junior high schools that lead to senior-level diplomas and "domestic science" junior high schools for girls.

After completing junior high school, students may attend three years (or two through an accelerated learning programme) of high school (Sekolah Menengah Atas, or SMA). Students who do not wish to attend traditional high schools can choose from forty-seven programmes of vocational and pre-professional high school (Sekolah Menengah Kejuruan, or SMK), divided into the following fields: technology and engineering, health, arts, crafts and tourism, information and communication technologies, agribusiness and agrotechnology, and business management. Students may also attend agricultural, veterinary, and forestry schools.

Special schools at the junior and senior levels teach hotel management, legal clerking, plastic arts, and music.

Students with disabilities or special needs may opt to be enrolled in a separate school from the mainstream called Sekolah Luar Biasa (SLB, Extraordinary School).

Teacher-training programmes are varied and are gradually being upgraded. In the 1950s, anyone completing a teacher-training programme at the junior high school level could obtain a teacher's certificate. Since the 1970s, primary-school teachers have been required to graduate from a senior high school for teachers, and teachers of higher grades have been required to complete a university-level education course.

=== School grades ===
The school year is divided into two semesters. The first commences in July and ends in December; the second commences in January and ends in June.

Level/Grade	Typical age
Preschool
Pre-school playgroup	3–4
Kindergarten	4–6
Primary school (Compulsory Education)
1st Grade	6–7
2nd Grade	7–8
3rd Grade	8–9
4th Grade	9–10
5th Grade	10–11
6th Grade	11–12
Middle school (Compulsory Education)
7th Grade	12–13
8th Grade	13–14
9th Grade	14–15
High school (Compulsory Education)
10th Grade	15–16
11th Grade	16–17
12th Grade	17–18
Post-secondary education
Undergraduate education	18+
Graduate education
Adult education

=== 2013 curriculum ===
Discipline		Subjects		Grade											
#	Name	#	Name	Primary school						Middle school			High school		
#	Name	#	Name	1	2	3	4	5	6	7	8	9	10	11	12
1	Education	1	Religion	4						3			2		
1	Education	2	Pancasila and civics	6						2					
1	Education	3	Physical education	4									2		
1	Education	4	Home economics	n/a						2					
2	Language (and literature)	1	Indonesian language	6									4		
2	Language (and literature)	2	English language	n/a						4					
3	Natural sciences	1	Mathematics	6						4					
3	Natural sciences	2	Physics	n/a			1.5			2			n/a		
3	Natural sciences	3	Biology	n/a			1.5			2			n/a		
4	Social sciences	1	History	n/a			1						2		
4	Social sciences	2	Geography	n/a			1						n/a		
4	Social sciences	3	Economics	n/a			1						n/a		
5	Arts	1	Music	1									1		
5	Arts	2	Painting	1									1		
5	Arts	3	Skill	1									n/a		
5	Arts	4	Dance	1									n/a		
6	N/A	1	Peminatan Akademik	n/a									2		
6	N/A	2	Kelompok Peminatan	n/a									16		
Total hours				27			29.5			29			41		
Total subjects				6			8			10			11		

Specialization groups (kelompok peminatan)

#	Natural sciences	Social sciences	Language and literature	Islamic schools	Christian theology schools	Catholic schools	Total hours
1	Mathematics	History	Indonesian language	History of Islam	History of Christianity	History of Catholicism	4
2	Physics	Geography	Anthropology	Tafsir	History of Church	Scripture	4
3	Biology	Economics	Indonesian literature	Quran and Hadith	Bible	Catholic Church doctrine and Christian morals	4
4	Chemistry	Sociology	Foreign language	Fiqh	Christian ethics	Liturgy	4

== Islamic schools ==
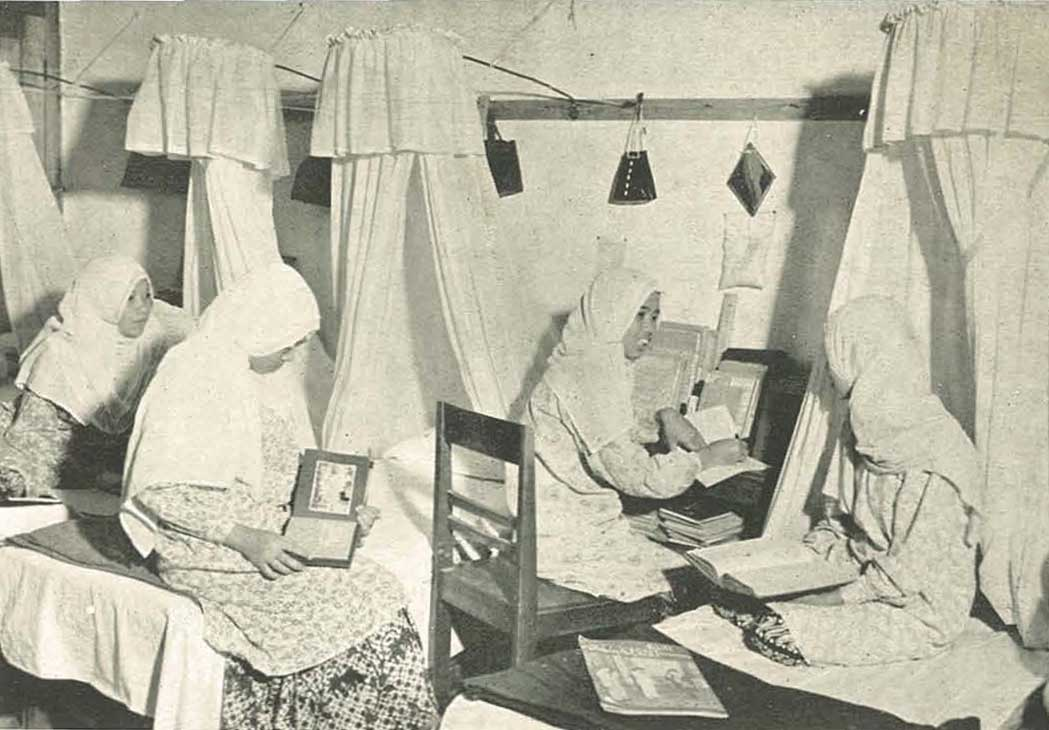
Students in the dorm of a school of higher Islamic education, Bukittinggi, c. 1953

There are three types of Islamic schools in Indonesia: pesantren, madrasah, and sekolah Islam. Pesantren are led by hereditary kyais, who lead the school and have religious authority. Madrasah vary in their ideological foundations and in the provision of secular and religious content. Sekolah Islam use the Ministry of Education and Culture's secular curriculum and add their own Islamic curricula.

Some Muslims have resisted the secular and nationalist emphasis in public schools and placed their children in pesantren. Usually found in rural areas and directed by a Muslim scholar, pesantren are attended by young people seeking a detailed understanding of the Quran, the Arabic language, sharia, and Muslim traditions and history, as well as more modern subjects such as English, mathematics, and geography. Students can enter and leave pesantren at any time of the year, and the studies are not organised as a progression of courses leading to graduation. Those who opt for a pesantren education can complete a state test to obtain a sixth-grade equivalency certificate.

Pesantren are not unified in their positions on Islam or secularism. Some pesantren emphasise the autonomy of modern students to think for themselves and to interpret scripture and modern knowledge in a way that is consistent with the teachings of Islam. Others are more traditional and stress the importance of following the wisdom of elders, including their teachings on science, religion, and family life. Although the terrorist bombings in Kuta, Bali, in 2002 raised suspicions about whether pesantren promote extremist views, the majority of these schools present themselves as theologically moderate and reflective of the views of the general Indonesian population.

For students to adapt to life in the modern nation-state, the Muslim-dominated Department of Religion (now the Ministry of Religious Affairs) advocated in the 1970s the spread of a newer variety of Muslim school: the madrasah. This type of school integrates religious subjects from pesantren with secular subjects from the Western-style public education system. Although the public generally believes that Islamic schools offer lower-quality education, among Islamic schools a madrasah is ranked lower than a pesantren.

Raudhatul Athfal (RA) is the Islamic pre-school equivalent of TK, Madrasah Ibtidaiyah (MI) is the Islamic schooling equivalent of SD, and Madrasah Tsanawiyah (MTs) is the Islamic schooling equivalent of SMP. Madrasah Aliyah (MA) is the Islamic schooling equivalent of SMA, while Madrasah Aliyah Kejuruan (MAK) is the equivalent of SMK.

== Higher education ==
College attainment rate of Indonesia by district (2022)

Higher education in Indonesia is offered by several types of institutions, including academic education, vocational education, and professional education.

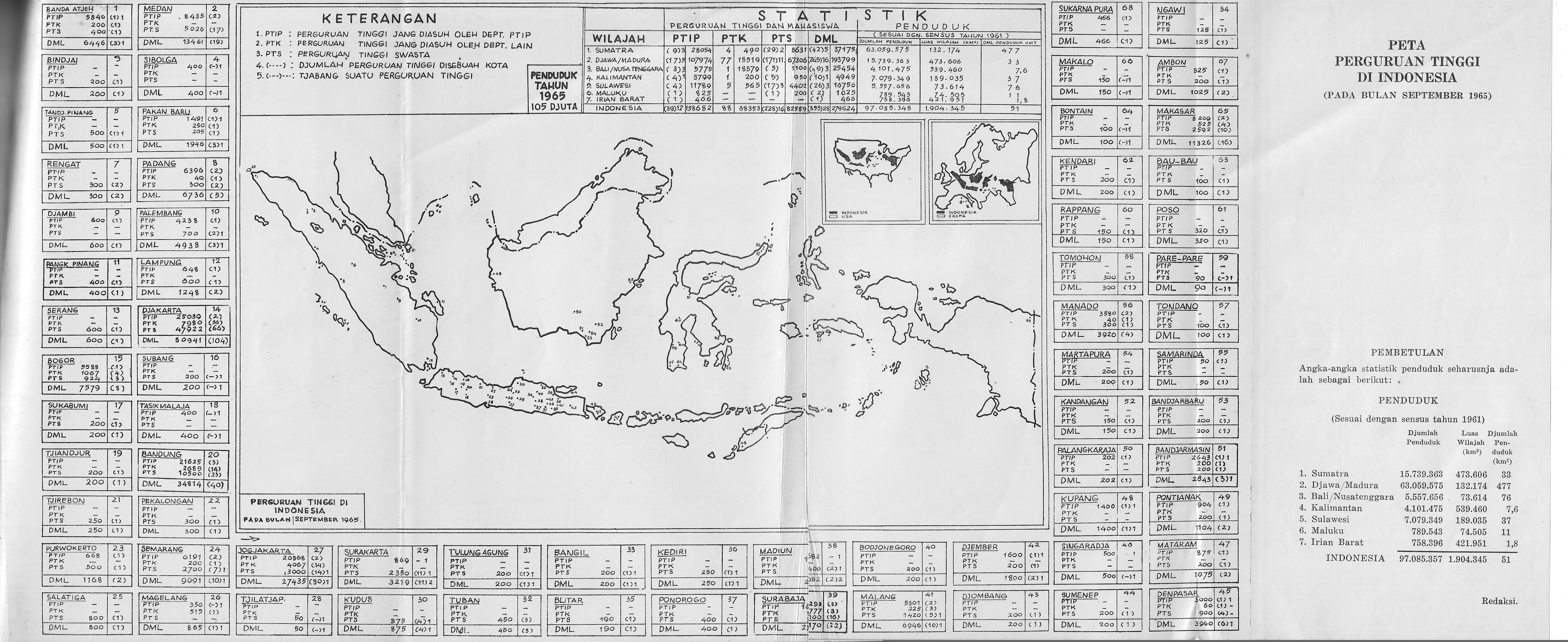
A map of higher education institutions in Indonesia per September 1965, according to the Department of Higher Education and Science.

Higher education institution types in Indonesia
Institutions	Academic Education	Vocational Education	Professional Education	Note
Universitas	Comprehensive	Comprehensive	✓	
Institut	Multidisciplinary	Multidisciplinary	✓	
Sekolah Tinggi	Monodisciplinary	Monodisciplinary	✓	
Politeknik	X	Comprehensive	✓	
Akademi	X	Mono/Multi-disciplinary	X	
Akademi Komunitas	X	Mono/Multi-disciplinary	X	Highest offered degree is diploma dua for local or special purposes.

Since 2012, the Indonesian education system has been organized on the Indonesian National Qualification Framework (Indonesian: Kerangka Kerja Nasional Indonesia, KKNI).

Indonesian National Qualification Framework (NQF)
Indonesian NQF Level	Academic education	Vocational education	Professional education	Career Development
9	Doktor Doctorate	Doktor Terapan Applied Doctorate	Spesialis Dua Subspecialist	Ahli Expert
8	Magister Master	Magister Terapan Applied Master	Spesialis Satu Specialist	Ahli Expert
7			Profesi First Professional	Ahli Expert
6	Sarjana Bachelor	Diploma Empat / Sarjana Terapan Bachelor		Teknisi / Analis Technician, Analyst
5		Diploma Tiga Diploma		Teknisi / Analis Technician, Analyst
4		Diploma Dua Diploma		Teknisi / Analis Technician, Analyst
3		Diploma Satu Diploma		Operator Operator

== See also ==
- Indonesian National Academic Exam
- Test-Based National Selection
- List of universities in Indonesia
- List of schools in Indonesia
- List of Indonesian agricultural universities and colleges
