= Sulaeman Sastrawinata =

Sundanese aristocrat

Raden Adipati Aria Sulaeman Sastrawinata
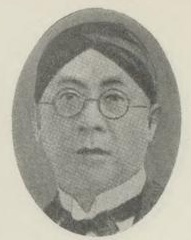

Regent of Ciamis
- In office 1914–1935
- Monarch: Wilhelmina

Personal details
- Born: 27 February 1869 Purwakarta, Dutch East Indies
- Died: 16 June 1951 (aged 82)
- Spouses: Mojanegara (m. 1896; died 1916); Suhaemi (m. 1916); Kancananingrat (m. 1919)
- Children: Multiple, including Kurnianingrat

Raden Adipati Aria Sulaeman Sastrawinata (27 February 1869 – 16 June 1951) was a Sundanese aristocrat and the regent of Ciamis under the Dutch East Indies from 1914 to 1935.

== Early life ==
Sastrawinata was born in Purwakarta, West Java. He had been the chief prosecutor (jaksa) in Serang.

== Regent of Ciamis ==
Sastrawinata (standing, far right) with Dutch directors and administrators of West Java companies

Sastrawinata was appointed regent (bupati) in 1914, replacing the retiring Raden Adipati Aria Kusumabrata of Galuh. In 1916, he changed the name of Galuh to Ciamis, a move that brought disapproval among many residents.

== Death ==
Sastrawinata died on 16 June 1951.

== Marriages and children ==
Sastrawinata's first marriage was to Mojanegara, whom he married in 1896. She died of dysentery and did not bear him any children, but they adopted a niece and nephew from Purwakarta. When she was seeking treatment from Dutch doctors in Garut, she became fond of a local girls' school teacher named Suhaemi, who was 15 years old at the time. Prior to her death, Mojanegara asked her husband to marry Suhaemi, and the two were married in 1916. Despite being the daughter of a wealthy landowner, Suhaemi was not of noble birth, so she could not become Sastraningrat's official wife and take the title of Raden Ayu. In 1919, he married Kancananingrat, the widowed daughter of the regent of Sumedang, and she became his Raden Ayu.

Ten days before Sastrawinata's marriage to Kancananingrat, Suhaemi gave birth to his first child, a daughter whom he named Kurnia, meaning gift. He later appended her name with ningrat to indicate aristocratic descent. Suhaemi's second child, a son, was born in 1924, and two more daughters were born in 1932 and 1934.
