= Kartini Schools =

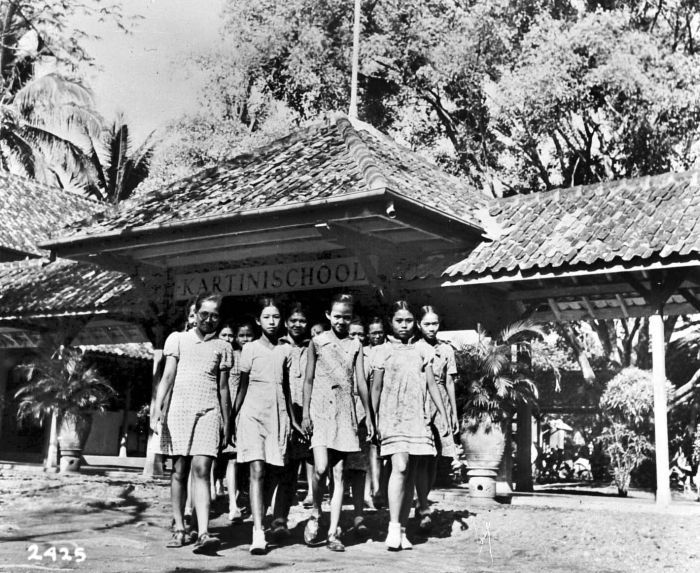
Kartini School in Jakarta

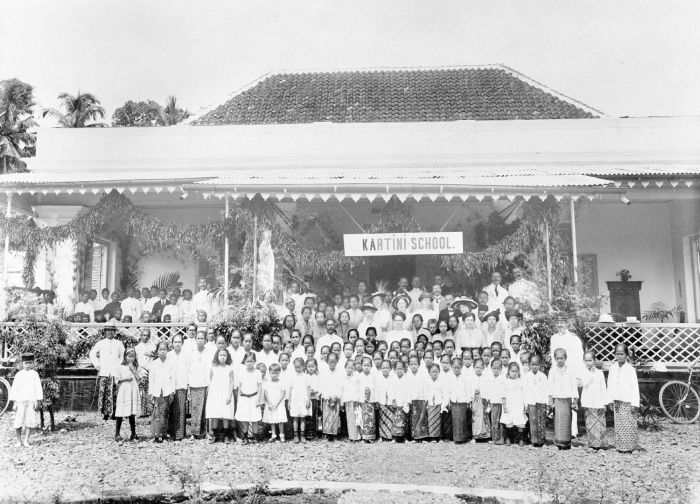
Opening of the Kartini School in Buitzenborg (Bogor) May 1915

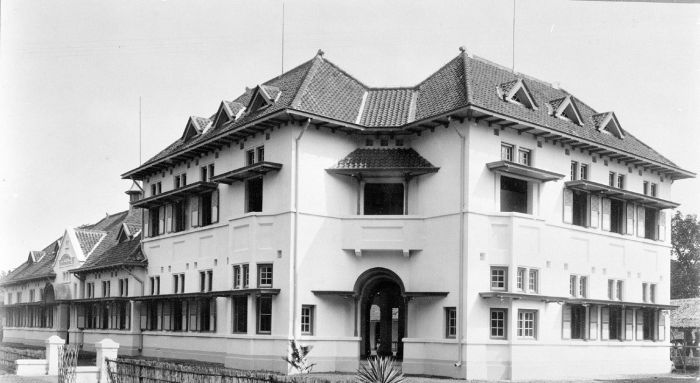
Kartini School building in Buitenzorg (opened 1918)

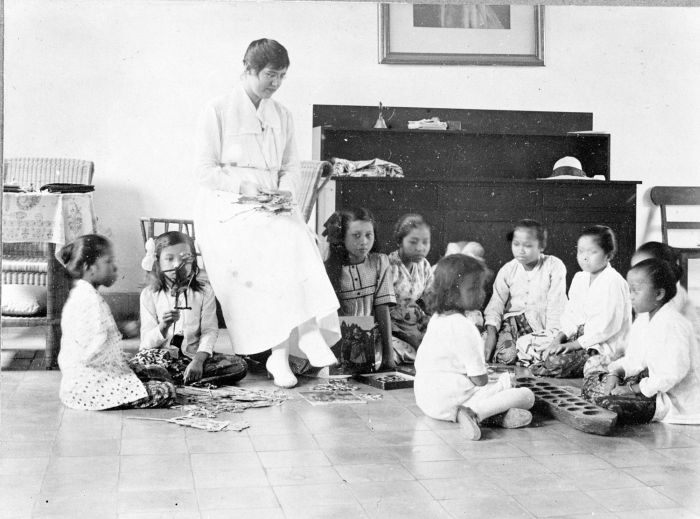
Class

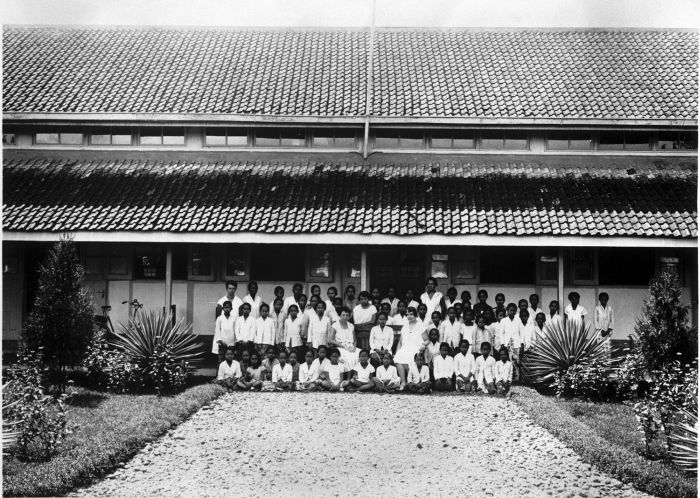
Kartini school in Malang

Kartini Schools, named for the Javanese women's rights advocate Raden Ajeng Kartini (Lady Kartini), were opened to educate indigenous girls in the Dutch East Indies in the wake of the Dutch Ethical Policy.

== About ==
The first Kartini School was opened in Batavia in 1907. It was supported by Governor General Abendanon and Queen Wilhelmina of the Netherlands. Additional Kartini Schools were opened in Malang, Cirebon, Semarang, Bogor (then called Buitenzorg), and Surabaya. The schools served indigenous students who had already received a primary education.

Efforts to create opportunities for upper-class Javanese women struggled against opposition from Conservative Dutch officials and the Javanese regent class (bupatis). The Dutch language boarding schools were staffed by women.

== Curriculum ==
The curriculum included:

- Continuing Dutch language instruction
- Javanese language and literature
- geography and history
- drawing and aesthetics
- home economics and gardening
- arithmetic and simple bookkeeping
- practical and fine needlework
- principles of hygiene and first aid
- principles of education
- singing and principles of musical theory

== See also ==
- Dutch Ethical Policy
