= Dahlan Abdullah =

Indonesian politician and diplomat

Haji Baginda Dahlan Abdullah
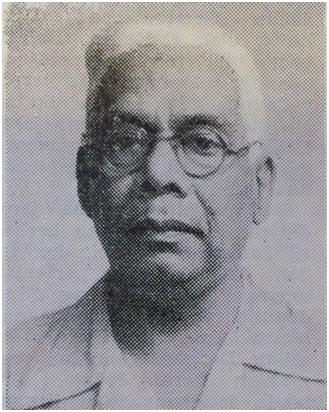

United States of Indonesia Ambassador to the Kingdom of Iraq
- In office 1 March 1950 – 12 May 1950

Personal details
- Born: Dahlan Abdoellah; 15 June 1895 Pariaman, West Sumatra, Dutch East Indies
- Died: 12 May 1950 (aged 54) Baghdad, Kingdom of Iraq
- Resting place: Mausoleum of Abdul-Qadir Gilani
- Spouse(s): Siti Nafisah (m. 1924; died 1927) Siti Akmar (m. 1930)
- Children: 8
- Parents: Abdoellah (father); Siti Alidjah (mother)
- Education: Leiden University

Baginda Dahlan Abdullah (15 June 1895 – 12 May 1950) was an Indonesian educator, politician, and diplomat of Minangkabau descent who served as the first ambassador of the United States of Indonesia to the Kingdom of Iraq, Syria, Jordan, and Lebanon.

== Biography ==
=== Early life ===
Dahlan Abdullah was born in Pariaman, West Sumatra, in the former Dutch East Indies on 15 June 1895, (Note: The 15 June 1895 birth date is engraved on Dahlan Abdullah's tomb in Baghdad. Chaniago, Nopriyasman & Abdullah (2020, p. 33) found at least one Japanese military administration source that alternatively indicates 15 July 1895 as his date of birth. This finding is echoed by Suryadi (2014, p. 2) in at least one Dutch colonial source.) the eldest son of Abdoellah, a local judge (kadi) of Islamic law, and Siti Alidjah, who is also known as Uniang. He had two younger brothers and seven younger sisters, three of whom died in childhood. His family belonged to the Minangkabau ethnic group, which reckons descent matrilineally, and his mother's lineage traces back five generations to the Tanjung clan (suku). Despite the matrilineality of Minangkabau culture, Dahlan inherited the aristocratic title Baginda from his father as a result of the influences of the patrilineal Islamic culture on Pariaman and Minangkabau society by traders from the Arab world. (Note: The aristocratic title is written alternatingly in different sources as Bagindo and Baginda. Chaniago, Nopriyasman & Abdullah (2020, p. 36) explain that, in the late 19th and early 20th centuries, Minangkabau people more commonly wrote in Arabic script, which does not contain the ⟨o⟩ sound that exists in the spoken Minangkabau language, so they resorted to using ⟨a⟩ in writing instead.)

Growing up, Dahlan lived with his family in the village of Pasia, one of Pariaman's most populated neighborhoods. He learned to read the Quran at a young age and enrolled in an indigenous elementary school (volkschool) at age seven or eight. The forward-thinking Abdoellah later enrolled his son in a Dutch-run school for indigenous children (Hollandsch-Inlandsche School) in the neighboring city of Padang, from where Dahlan would graduate in 1907. The following year, his father enrolled him in a prestigious auxiliary teacher training school (Hollandsch Inlandsche Kweekschool) in Fort de Kock (now Bukittinggi), entering in the same class as the future Marxist revolutionary figure Tan Malaka. It is unknown how Abdoellah was able to enroll his son in the European-style school, but Dutch colonial officials during that period were known to have sympathized with indigenous families whose children demonstrated academic prowess.

=== Education and activism in the Netherlands ===
Upon graduation with an indigenous teacher's certificate in 1913, Dahlan, Tan Malaka, and a third student were offered the opportunity to continue their education in the Netherlands. Sponsored by a scholarship from the Christian Hague Society (Haagsch Genootschap), Dahlan arrived in The Hague that November and enrolled in a Christian teacher's school. School archives indicate that he was the only indigenous person from the East Indies in a class of 21 students, with the remaining students coming from various places throughout the Netherlands. He graduated in 1915, one year earlier than scheduled, with a certificate allowing him to teach primary school.

Dahlan pursued higher education and enrolled in Leiden University, eventually joining the Indies Association (Indische Vereeniging), a student association founded to promote East Indies culture and causes. In 1916, Java saw its biggest floods in 30 years, submerging villages and rail infrastructure. Dahlan successfully organized the association's charity event to raise funds for the flood's victims. That same year, at the urging of the exiled Javanese writer Soewardi Soerjaningrat, he attempted public speaking for the first time at the 1916 Colonial Education Congress (Eerste Koloniaal Onderwijscongres) and advocated for the role of indigenous teachers in Dutch language instruction as part of Dutch Ethical Policy in the East Indies. Because of these two events, he gained the support of fellow students and, in 1917, was elected as the youngest chairperson in the history of the association at the age of 22.

At Leiden University, Dahlan formed a close relationship with Philippus Samuel van Ronkel, a Malay language scholar hired to replace the late linguist Charles Adriaan van Ophuijsen. Between 1918 and 1923, Dahlan was hired as Van Ronkel's teaching assistant (hulpleraar), becoming the first native speaker of Malay to teach the language at the university. He provided instruction on conversational Malay to Dutch colonial officer candidates seeking assignment in the East Indies, while Van Ronkel taught Malay grammar. In 1919, he was accepted as a member of the Bijdragen tot de Taal-, Land- en Volkenkunde, a prestigious academic journal with special emphasis on Southeast Asia and the East Indies.

=== Ambassador to Iraq ===
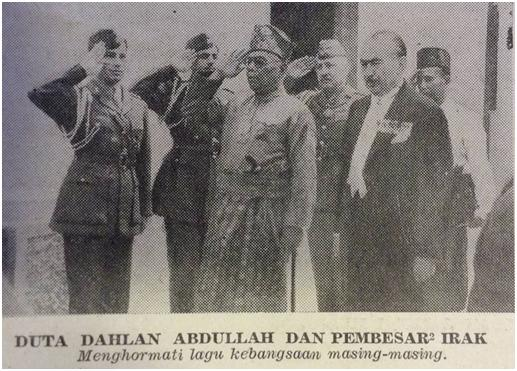
Dahlan Abdullah, center, dressed in traditional Minangkabau clothing, was received by the Iraqi government with military honors on 8 April 1950.

Following the conclusion of the Dutch–Indonesian Round Table Conference and the formation of the United States of Indonesia, the newly-formed government appointed the country's first ten ambassadors between January and February 1950. Out of these ten individuals, Dahlan Abdullah and Rasjidi were named ambassadors to the Kingdom of Iraq and the Kingdom of Egypt, respectively, to establish formal relations with two of the first countries to recognize Indonesia's independence and support its diplomatic efforts in the United Nations. The Masyumi Party, whose selections for posts in Islamic countries were given priority as an Islamic political party, submitted Dahlan's nomination in a cabinet meeting on 20 February. He was sworn in to his post on 27 February, and his appointment took effect on 1 March. Although he was formally assigned to Baghdad, he also represented Indonesia's interests in Syria, Jordan, and Lebanon. Dahlan presented his diplomatic credentials to 'Abd al-Ilah, the Regent of Iraq, in a ceremony held at the royal palace on 8 April.

== Death ==
Two of his daughters followed him to Baghdad several days later, where they observed him often working late into the night setting up the embassy's operations and attending diplomatic receptions. He was later admitted into the hospital after exhibiting signs of weakness and exhaustion and died on 12 May.

== Legacy ==
On the recommendation of Indonesian foreign minister Agus Salim, the government and his family decided to bury him in Baghdad as a "symbol of the eternal bond between Indonesia and Iraq". Dahlan's funeral procession on 19 May was attended by thousands of Baghdad residents, and the Iraqi government granted permission for his body to be interred at the complex of the Mausoleum of Abdul-Qadir Gilani.
