= Kartini =

Indonesian who advocated for women's rights and female education

Raden Adjeng Kartini
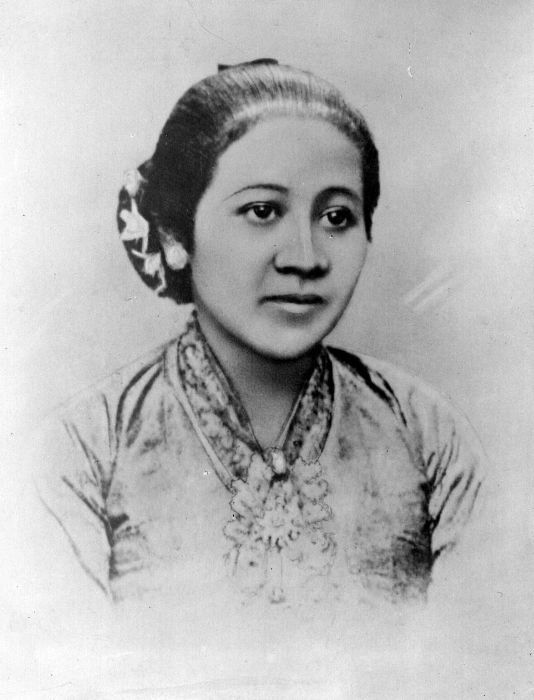
- Portrait of Raden Adjeng Kartini
- Born: 21 April 1879; Jepara, Dutch East Indies
- Died: 17 September 1904 (aged 25); Rembang, Dutch East Indies
- Other name: Raden Adjeng Kartini
- Known for: Women's emancipation; national heroine
- Spouse: Raden Adipati Joyodiningrat (m. 1903)
- Children: Soesalit Djojoadhiningrat
- Parents: Raden Adipati Sosroningrat (father); Ngasirah (mother)

Raden Adjeng Kartini, also known as Raden Ayu Kartini (21 April 1879 – 17 September 1904), (Note: Raden Adjeng was a title borne by women of the priyayi or Javanese nobles of the Robe class.) was a prominent Indonesian advocate of women's rights and female education.

She was born into an aristocratic Javanese family in the Dutch East Indies (present-day Indonesia). After attending a Dutch-language primary school, she wanted to pursue further education, but Javanese women at the time were barred from higher education. Instead, Kartini entered a period of seclusion mandated for teenage girls until they married. She acquired knowledge by reading books and by corresponding with Indonesian and Dutch people. Her father allowed her to go into the community beginning in 1896, although she remained an unmarried single woman. She opposed the Purdah-like seclusion of teenage girls and polygamy.

She met various officials and influential people, including J.H. Abendanon. She began the tradition amongst three of her sisters to found and operate schools. After she died, schools were established by a foundation founded in the Netherlands. Some of her Indonesian friends also established Kartini Schools.

After her death, her sisters continued her advocacy of educating girls and women. Kartini's letters were published in a Dutch magazine and eventually, in 1911, as the works: Door Duisternis tot Licht (From Dark Comes Light) and an English version, Letters of a Javanese Princess.

In 1964, Kartini was declared as a National Hero of Indonesia, and her birthday is now celebrated in Indonesia as Kartini Day in her honor.

== Background ==
During Kartini's life, Indonesia became an important Dutch colony with natural resources of rubber and oil and the production of tobacco that attracted more Dutch immigrants than any other Dutch colonial possession. The Dutch sought to control the entire Indonesian archipelago, which they did by the 20th century. In the meantime, there were technological advancements with the opening of the Suez Canal in 1869, the laying of telegraph lines, and the construction of railroads, which brought the colony into the modern age. As more Dutch people immigrated to Indonesia, more private businesses were founded, and educational opportunities opened up for the Indonesian noble class, when Dutch schools were opened up for immigrants. The feminist movement in the Netherlands began to spread to the traditional Indonesian culture. Polygyny was common amongst Indonesian aristocrats. Muslims could have up to four wives. Common wives had little authority in their husband's households. They often supported themselves and lived in separate buildings from their husband. Women generally had little influence in the patriarchal Indonesian society. Men's social standing was determined by the number of wives they had.

== Biography ==
=== Early life ===
Kartini was born 21 April 1879, in Java, Indonesia, in the village of Mayong. Her parents were Raden Adipati Sosroningrat, a member of the priyayi (Javanese gentry), and Ngasirah, the daughter of a religious scholar. Her father worked for the Dutch colonial empire of the Dutch East Indies as the administrative head of north-central Java. In 1880, he became the Regent of Jepara, which meant that, in all likelihood, Kartini would marry another Regent.

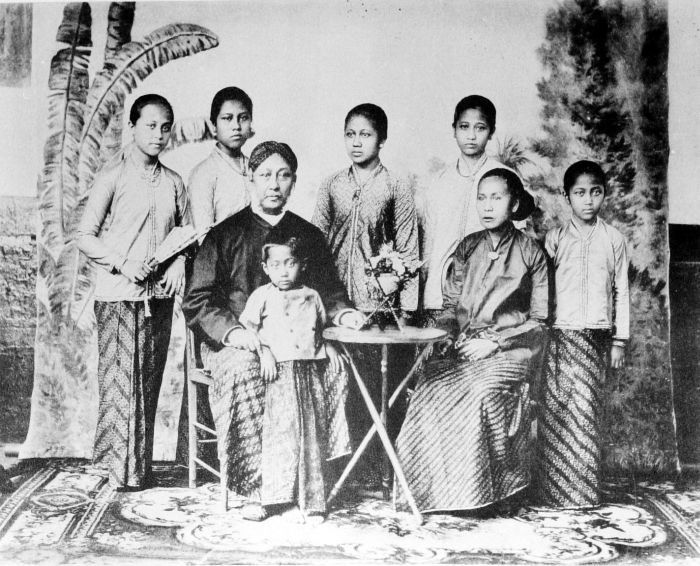
Kartini with her family, 1890 to 1904

Her mother, Ngasirah, was 14 and a commoner when she married Sosroningrat. Her parents were Nyai Haji Siti Aminah, who had a pilgrimage to Mecca, and Kyai Modirono, likely devout Muslims. Ngasirah was Sosroningrat's first wife, with whom he had eight children. His next wife was the aristocratic Raden Ayu Sosroningrat, with whom he had three daughters. Regents were expected to marry nobility. Kartini called her step-mother "mother", rather than her birth mothers.

Kartini was the fifth child and second-eldest daughter in a family of eleven, including half-siblings. She was born into a family with a strong intellectual tradition. Her grandfather, Pangeran Ario Tjondronegoro IV, became a regent at the age of 25, while Kartini's older brother, Sosrokartono, was an accomplished linguist.

=== Education ===
Kartini attended a Dutch school, which was her initiation to the Western world, beginning at the age of six. She was among the first Indonesian children to attend a European school and was treated poorly by teachers and fellow students. Over time, though, she was recognized for her intelligence. Kartini was a fluent speaker of the Dutch language. Most Indonesian girls spoke Malay. While at Dutch school, she also studied with Marie Ovink-Soer, the wife of another regent, who gave Kartini sewing lessons and taught her about feminist viewpoints. She remained in Dutch school until she was a teenager when she experienced the purdah-like "sheltered existence deemed appropriate to a young female noble", from 1891 to 1895. During this period, she was expected to be meek and compliant with rigid cultural rules and etiquette. She learned to cook and do other household chores. She made batik fabric and her clothing. Uncomfortable with the hierarchical dictates, Kartini was considerate of her subordinates and did not expect servants, commoners, or her younger siblings to treat her according to the cultural traditions. She was particularly annoyed when women berated or talked in a rebuking manner about young girls, the lowest on the hierarchical ladder. Kartini stood up for all of the females to go to school.

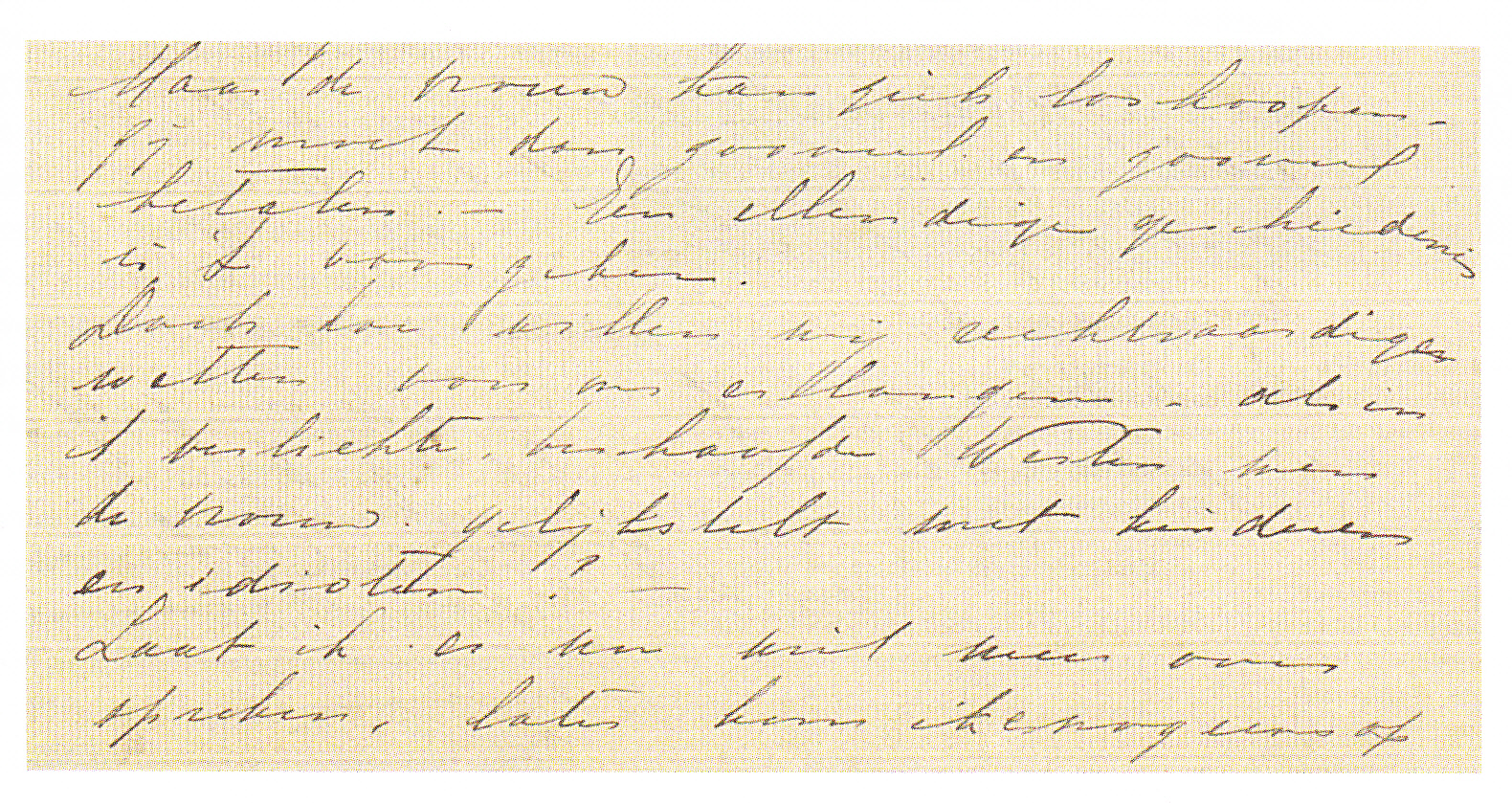
Kartini: Part of a letter to Rosa Abendanon, 1903 or 1904. Dutch:Maar de vrouw kan zich los koopen, zij moet dan zooveel en zooveel betalen... Translation: But the woman can ransom herself, she then has to pay so and so much...

During her seclusion, Kartini read feminist and political publications, including that of Pandita Ramabai Sarasvati. She said of the activist for outcastes and women, "So it's not only white women who are able to take care of themselves-a brown woman can make herself free and independent too."

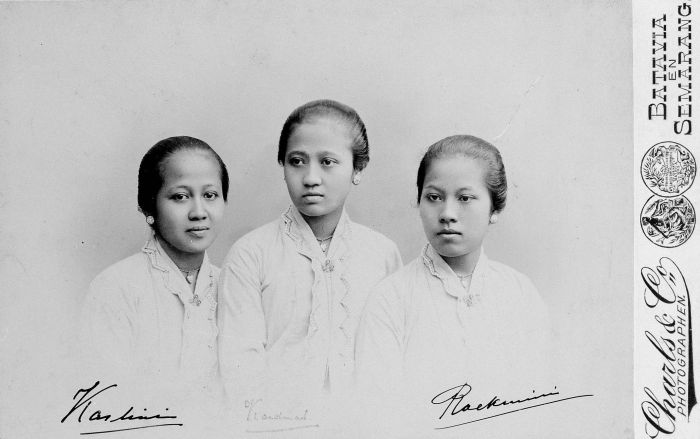
Portraits of - from left to right - the three sisters Kartini, Kardinah and Roekmini by two different mothers. Kartini and Kardinah were daughters of Ngasirah. Roekmini was the daughter of the chief wife, Raden Ayu Sosroningrat, 1902.

Kartini and her sisters, Kardinah and Roekmini, were allowed one way they could escape the seclusion periodically. They visited Marie Ovink-Soer for piano and handicrafts training.

Kartini was fluent in Dutch and acquired several Dutch pen pals. One of them was a girl named Rosa Abendanon, who later became a close friend. Kartini shared her opinions about feminism and her concern about traditional Javanese practices with her friends from Dutch school and Ovink-Soer. She was particularly concerned that Javanese girls were often denied an education and forced into marriage when they were young. She believed that education was important to develop oneself and to prepare for motherhood and was against arranged marriages and polygamy. Kartini believed that women should be free to make decisions themselves.

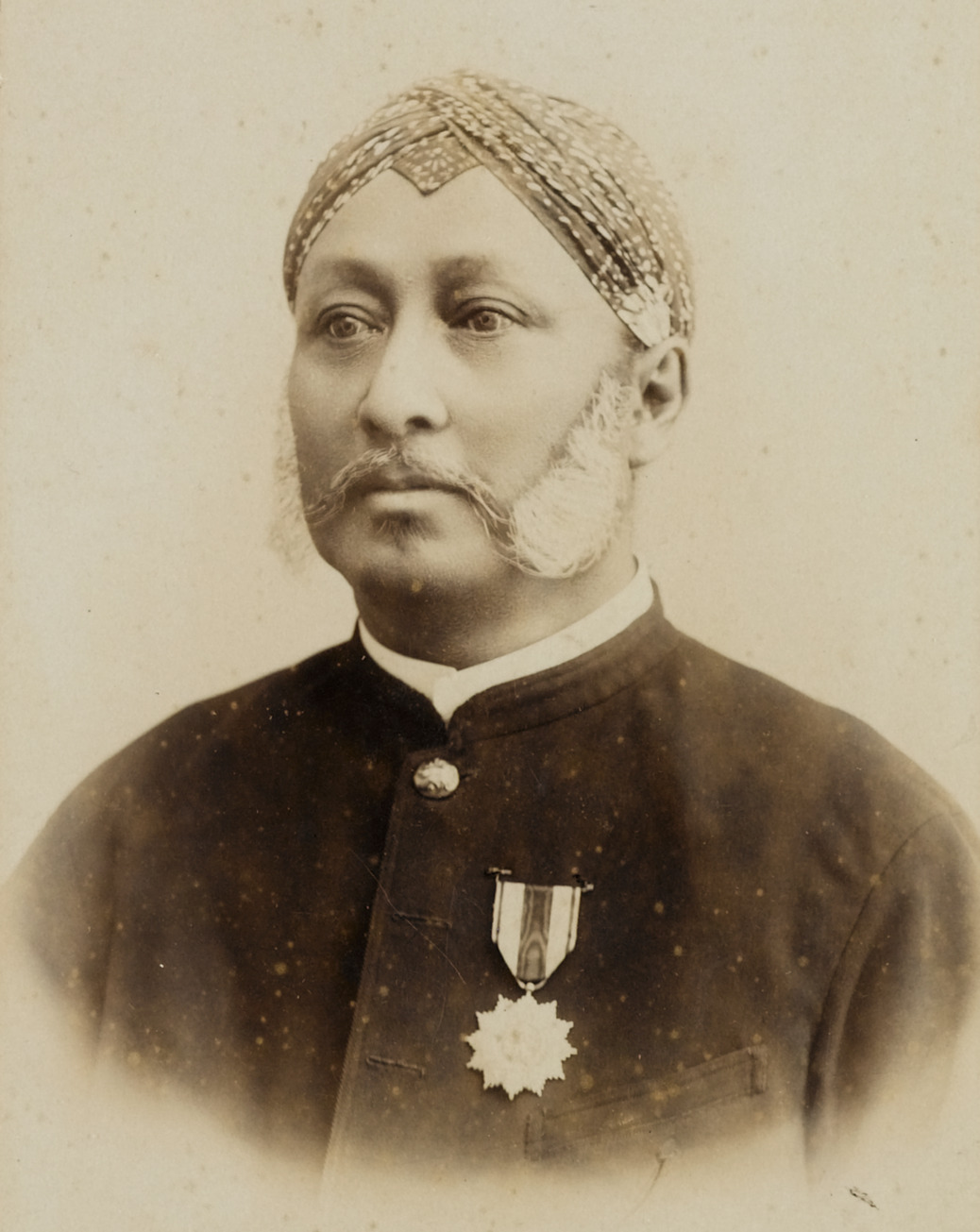
Raden Adipati Sosroningrat, regent of Jepara (1881-1905) and Kartini's father with a decoration. Probably Semarang, 1900.

Beginning in 1896, Kartini was given permission by her father to occasionally leave the room in which she was secluded to visit a village of wood carvers, attend the consecration of a protestant church, and other special occasions. The more that she became acquainted with life outside her home, the more that she became interested in the concerns of other Indonesians. Some of her articles were published during this time. Members of her family and noble Indonesian and Dutch people considered the unmarried Kartini's activities in the community a scandal.

In 1898, a ball was held to celebrate the Inauguration of Wilhelmina of the Netherlands. Unusual for the time, Kartini and her closest two unmarried sisters were invited to attend the ball with their father, which Kartini saw as a recognition of her leadership and as a representative for single women. She decided that educational courses in character should be given to students due to the "deceit and hypocrisy" exhibited by Europeans and Asians at the ball.

=== Marriage and death ===
By the time that Kartini reached the age of 16, she was expected to marry. Rather than being addressed to society as a woman looking to marry, she was introduced as a single woman. She had no intention of marrying at that age. By 20, her viewpoint had changed. In a letter, she stated, "Some day it will, it must happen, that I shall leave home with a husband who is a stranger to me."

Raden Adipati Djojo Adiningrat (also known as Raden Adipati Joyodiningrat Rembang) was a widowed progressive leader. He learned about Kartini and approached her father to discuss the possibility of an arranged marriage. The couple agreed that Kartini would continue her plans for the school. Kartini married Joyodiningrat on 8 November 1903. There was a 26-year age difference between Kartini and her husband. She became the fourth wife of Joyodiningrat, who had 12 children at the time. Her marriage precluded her from accepting a scholarship. Soon after her marriage, Kartini became pregnant and was optimistic about the life her child would have. She continued to work at the school during her pregnancy. Her son Raden Mas Singgih was born on 13 September 1904. Kartini died on 17 September 1904, four days after giving birth to her only child. She was buried at Bulu Village, Rembang.

== Accomplishments ==
=== Letters ===
Kartini wrote letters extensively about matters important to her, including art, politics, education, public health, economic welfare, and literature. The letters were sent to her Dutch friends, including J.H. Abendanon, the Minister for Culture, Religion, and Industry in the East Indies, and his family.

Kartini corresponded with Estelle (Stella) Zeehandelaar, who answered her pen-pal ad in the Daily Lily in 1900. Unlike Kartini, who had been secluded for many years, Stella was a 25-year-old woman from Amsterdam who supported herself. Kartini wrote about her feelings about marriage, polygyny, traditional mores, and education. She also wrote about her relationship with her father and how she planned to improve herself. She met Abendanon, who sought to improve educational opportunities for girls, also in 1900. She began to correspond with Mevrouw (Mrs.) Abendanon-Mandri. Their letters provide insight into the changes in her life and in colonial Indonesian life.

Seven years after Kartini's death, Abendanon collected, edited, and published her letters. The book titled Door Duisternis tot Licht (From Dark Comes Light) was published in 1911. She was the first Indonesian whose opinions were published in Dutch and popular among Dutch-speaking Indonesians and Europeans. This publication was edited to exclude references to colonial figures, Islamic beliefs, and Javanese culture, and the English translation made further changes. The book was translated into English by Agnes L. Symmers as Letters of a Javanese Princess published in 1920. The English book focused on Symmers' view of an Oriental woman in love, focusing on her personal life, and excluding letters that showed her as an intelligent forward-thinking woman. Books were published for Indonesians, a version in Malay in 1922 and another Malay version in 1951 by Armijn Pane, excluding some of Kartini's most important letters. In 1960, UNESCO published 19 of Kartini's letters in French. The letters are available at Leiden University Libraries and can also be consulted digitally. A complete English translation of all of Kartini's letters was published in 2014 by Joost Coté in Kartini: The Complete Writings 1898-1904 along with articles and other writings by her.

On 11 April 2025, UNESCO inscribed the Kartini letters and archive, held at Leiden University Libraries, Nationaal Archief and National Archives of Indonesia, in its Memory of the World Register affirming their world significance and outstanding universal value.

=== East and West ===
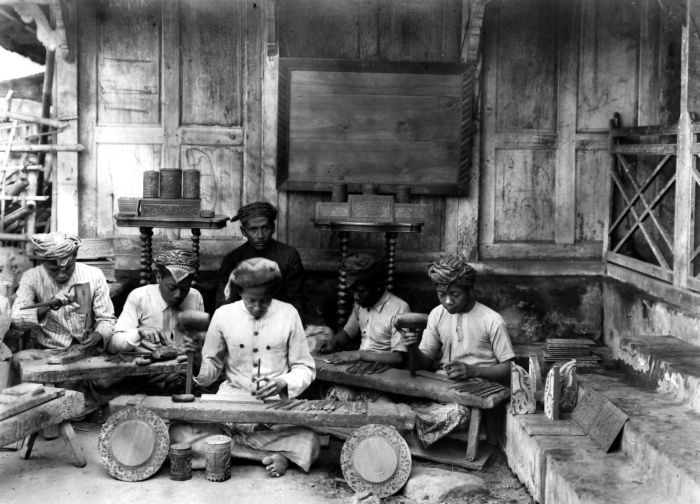
Teak wood carvings were a typical feature in wealthy homes, including furniture and doors. A group of woodcarvers from Jepara at work, between 1900 and 1920.

Kartini coordinated efforts between a group of Indonesian artists and Europeans in the East and West association. Europeans provided funding for an art shop to create carved wood pieces. Kartini operated a school.

=== Schools ===
Kartini believed that women were paramount in the process of improving the lives of Indonesian men and women, and because of that, she developed an education plan for girls that had the same academics and character-building instruction as for boys but also included hygiene, first aid, and money management. Kartini was particularly concerned about the lack of medical care for Indonesians, and female Indonesians in particular. So much so that she considered attending medical school.

Kartini was introduced to Henri van Kol, a member of parliament, in August 1902, who offered to help her realize her plan to study teaching and first aid in the Netherlands. The goal was to have the knowledge to open a school, teach, and be the school's headmistress. He contacted the States General on her behalf. Kartini received a scholarship, but many people in her life were concerned about her leaving Java.

Kartini, with her husband's support, opened up a school for women in Rembang's Regency Office complex. She operated the school by herself, teaching 10 girls four days a week. In 1903, she wrote a report to the government entitled Educate the Javanese Now that discussed the significance of receiving a quality education and offered some recommended methods for achieving it.

Following Kartini's death, a foundation was established in the Netherlands to continue Kartini's vision for building and operating schools. Indonesian women also opened Kartini Schools from 1913 and into the 1930s in Java. Students of the schools included Java's first female graduate of medical school, and another woman was its first law graduate. Women asserted themselves to create productive lives of their own making. In 1945, equal rights for women was written into Indonesia's first constitution.

Her sisters continued the legacy of operating schools, including Rockmini. Kardinah also wrote textbooks and established a medical school. Soematri also focused on vocational education for women.

== Legacy and tributes ==
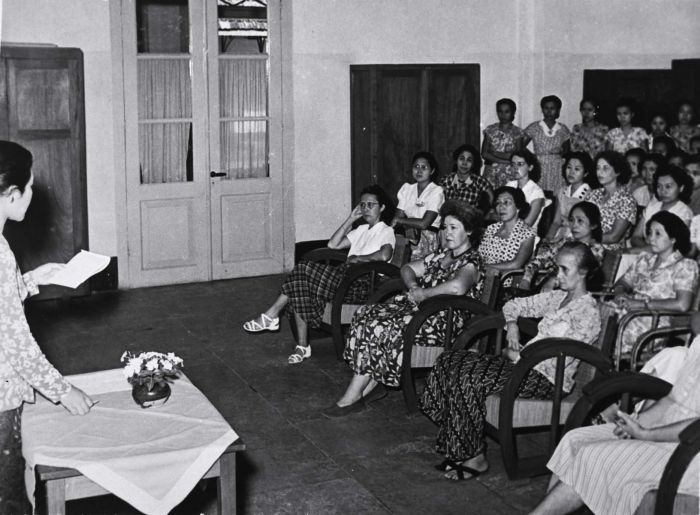
Commemoration of Kartini Day 21 April 1953.

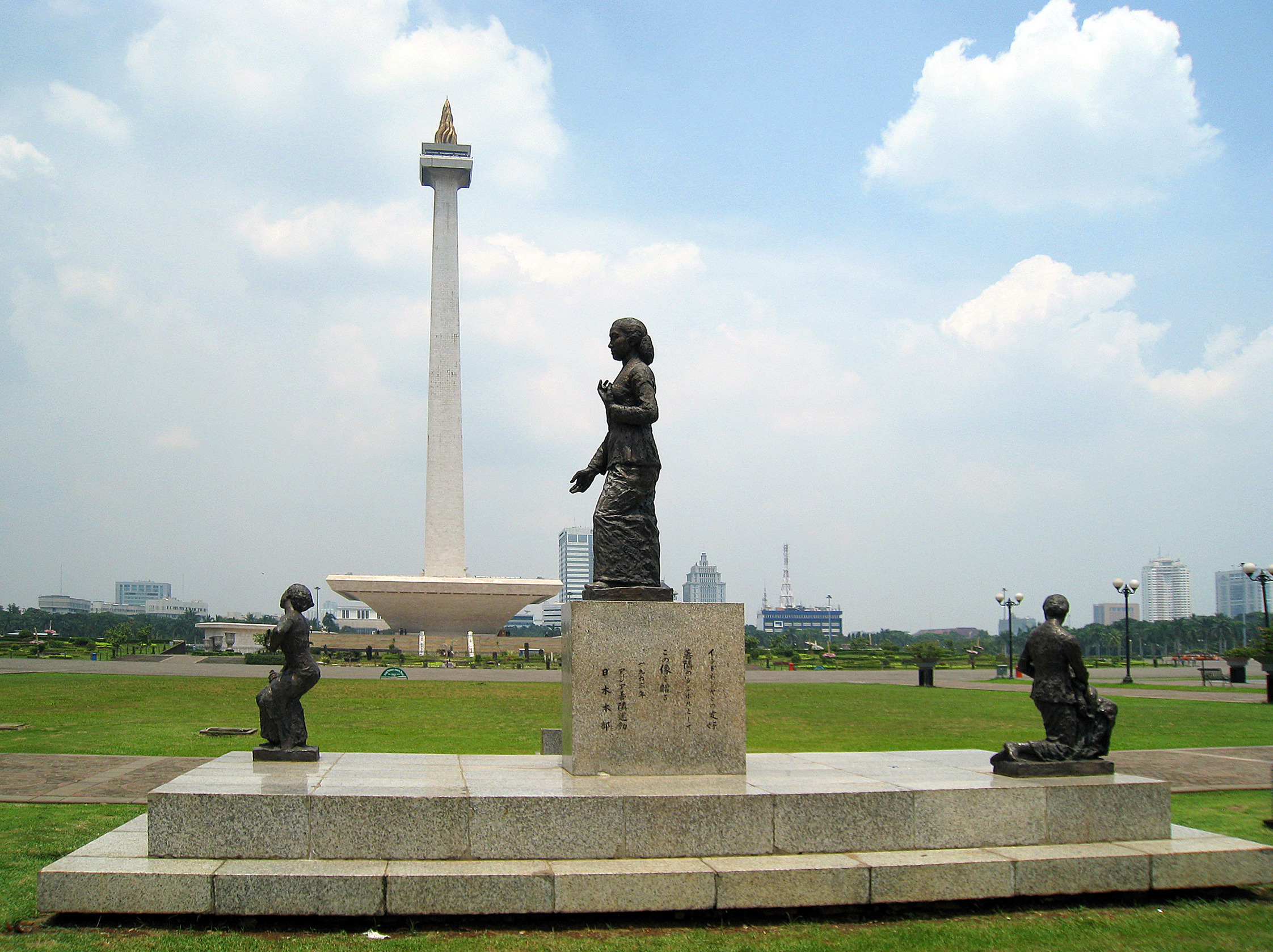
Kartini and Indonesian women emancipation statue, donated by Japanese people. East park of Merdeka Square, Jakarta, Central Jakarta. Photo 2010.

- Kartini Schools opened in Bogor, Jakarta, and Malang. A society was also established in her name in the Netherlands.
- Kartini is a National Hero of Indonesia.
- Kartini was an intellectual who elevated the status of Indonesian women and a nationalist figure with modern ideas, who struggled on behalf of her people and played a role in the national struggle for independence. She is among the first modern intellectuals in Indonesia.
- She appeared twice on the Indonesian rupiah banknotes, in the 5 rupiah (1952 edition, which issued in 1953) and the 10,000 rupiah (1985 edition).
- Sukarno's Old Order state declared 21 April as Kartini Day in 1963 to remind women that they should participate in "the hegemonic state discourse of pembangunan (development)". After 1965, however, Suharto's New Order state reconfigured the image of Kartini from that of radical women's emancipator to one that portrayed her as a dutiful wife and obedient daughter, "as only a woman dressed in a kebaya who can cook." On that occasion, popularly known as Hari Ibu Kartini or Mother Kartini Day, "young girls were to wear tight, fitted jackets, batik shirts, elaborate hairstyles, and ornate jewelry to school, supposedly replicating Kartini's attire but in reality, wearing an invented and more constricting ensemble than she ever did."
- The melody of "Ibu Kita Kartini" (Our Mother Kartini) by W. R. Supratman:
- On 21 April 2016, Google celebrated her 137th birthday with a Google Doodle.

== See also ==
- Gerwani, an Indonesian Women's Movement

== Bibliography ==
- Ramusack, Barbara N. (2005). "Women and Gender in South and Southeast Asia". In Bonnie G. Smith (ed.). Women's History in Global Perspective. University of Illinois Press. pp. 101–138 [129]. ISBN 978-0-252-02997-4.
- Taylor, Jean Stewart (1976). "Raden Ajeng Kartini". Signs. 1 (3): 639–661. doi:10.1086/493247. ISSN 0097-9740. JSTOR 3173146. S2CID 144077178.
