= List of Indonesian national songs =

Indonesian national songs list

This is a list of Indonesian national songs with the creators based on the alphabet.

== A–D ==
- Andika Bhayangkari (Amir Pasaribu)
- Api Kemerdekaan (Joko Lelono / Marlene)
- Bagimu Negeri (R. Kusbini)
- Bangun Pemudi-Pemuda (Alfred Simanjuntak)
- Bendera Kita (Dirman Sasmokoadi)
- Bungaku (Cornel Simanjuntak)
- Bendera Merah Putih (Ibu Soed)
- Berkibarlah Benderaku (Ibu Soed)
- Bhinneka Tunggal Ika (Binsar Sitompul/A. Thalib)
- Dari Sabang Sampai Merauke (R. Soerardjo)
- Di Timur Matahari (Wage Rudolf Soepratman)
- Dirgahayu Indonesia (Husein Mutahar)
- Desaku (Liberty Manik)
- Berkibarlah Bendera Negriku (Gombloh)
- Tanah Air Indonesia (E.L. Pohan)

== E–H ==
- Gugur Bunga (Ismail Marzuki)
- Halo, Halo Bandung (Ismail Marzuki)
- Hamba Menyanyi (R. Sutedjo)
- Hari Merdeka (Husein Mutahar)
- Himne Kemerdekaan (Ibu Soed/Wiratmo Sukito)
- Himne Guru (Sartono)
- Himne Pramuka (Husein Mutahar)
- Himne Siswa (Husein Mutahar)

== I–L ==
- Ibu Kita Kartini (Wage Rudolf Soepratman)
- Ibu Pertiwi (song) (Kamsidi Samsuddin and/or Ismail Marzuki)
- Indonesia Bersatulah (Alfred Simanjuntak)
- Indonesia Jaya (Chaken M)
- Indonesia Raya (Wage Rudolf Soepratman)
- Indonesia Subur (M Syafei)
- Indonesia Pusaka (Ismail Marzuki)
- Indonesia Tetap Merdeka (Cornel Simanjuntak)
- Indonesia Tumpah Darahku (Ibu Soed)
- Jembatan Merah (Gesang)
- Karangan Bunga dari Selatan (Ismail Marzuki)
- Kebyar Kebyar (Gombloh)
- Ku Pinta Lagi (Cornel Simanjuntak)

== M–P ==
- Maju Indonesia (Cornel Simanjuntak)
- Maju Tak Gentar (Cornel Simanjuntak)
- Mars Bambu Runcing (Kamsidi/Daldjono)
- Mars Harapan Bangsa (Kamsidi/Daldjono)
- Mars Pancasila (Sudharnoto)
- Melati di Tapal Batas (Ismail Marzuki)
- Mengheningkan Cipta (Hymne Pahlawan) (Truno Prawit)
- Merah Putih (Ibu Soed)
- Merah Putih (Gombloh)
- Nusantara
- Nyiur Hijau (Maladi)
- Pada Pahlawan (Cornel Simanjuntak/Usmar Ismail)
- Padi Menguning (Kusbini)
- Pahlawan Merdeka (Wage Rudolf Soepratman)
- Pantang Mundur (Titiek Puspa)

== Q–T ==
- Rayuan Pulau Kelapa (Ismail Marzuki)
- Satu Nusa Satu Bangsa (Liberty Manik)
- Selamat Datang Pahlawan Muda (Ismail Marzuki)
- Sepasang Mata Bola (Ismail Marzuki)
- Serumpun Padi (Maladi)
- Sumpah Kita (A.E. Wairata)
- Syukur (Husein Mutahar)
- Tanah Airku (Ibu Soed)
- Tanah Airku (R. Iskak)
- Tanah Tumpah Darahku (Cornel Simanjuntak/Sanusi Pane)
- Teguh Kukuh Berlapis Baja (Cornel Simanjuntak/Usmar Ismail)
- Terima Kasih Kepada Pahlawanku (Husein Mutahar)

== See also ==
- List of national anthems
- List of regional songs of Indonesia
