= Ibu Pertiwi (disambiguation) =

Ibu Pertiwi is a national personification of Indonesia.

Ibu Pertiwi may also refer to:

- Ibu Pertiwi (song), 1908 song by Kamsidi Samsuddin
- The official name of the flag of Sarawak
