= Bandung Sea of Fire =

Burning of Bandung, Indonesia, in 1946

Coordinates: 6°55′S 107°35′E

Bandung Great Fire
- Part of the Indonesian National Revolution
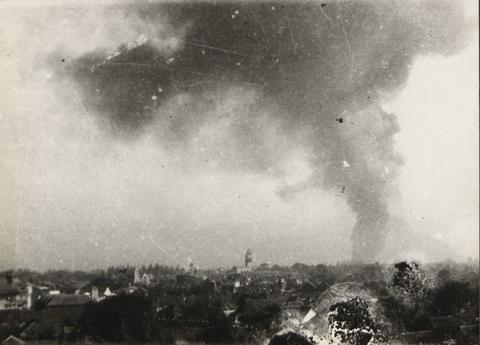
- The southern part of Bandung was burned by Indonesian militias
- Native name: Bandung Lautan Api
- Location: Bandung, West Java, Indonesia
- Date: 23–24 March 1946
- Attack type: Scorched earth
- Perpetrator: Indonesian Army

The Bandung Sea of Fire (Indonesian: Bandung Lautan Api) refers to the deliberate burning of much of the southern side of the city of Bandung by retreating Indonesian Republican troops during the Indonesian National Revolution.

Following the Indonesian proclamation of independence, tensions and fighting in the city of Bandung began to emerge between the newly formed Indonesian armed forces (People's Security Agency and its successors) and Indonesian nationalist youths on one side, with remnant Japanese and British armed forces on the other. After initial success in Japanese attempts to gain control of the city in October, the arrival of British forces resulted in continued fighting, which initially resulted in a stalemate where Bandung was divided into the British-controlled north and Indonesian-controlled south. Following an ultimatum to militarily evacuate south Bandung in March 1946, Indonesian forces conducted a general evacuation of the area involving hundreds of thousands of civilians, burning down various buildings and looting warehouses to deny British, and later Dutch army, the use of the buildings and supplies.

== Prelude ==
=== Independence of Indonesia ===
On 17 August 1945, news of the proclamation reached Bandung via radio around noon, and spread throughout virtually the entire city by 19 August. Details about the event remained scarce for the first few days, until more information arrived. The sudden pronouncement left the existing social order largely intact for the first month or so, with the nationalist government establishing a local government unit (Komite Nasional Indonesia, KNI) in Bandung (i.e. the Priangan Regency) by 24 August. These committees were initially focused with spreading information about the independence and maintaining public order.

Japanese occupation forces in the area had begun to disarm and disband the Japanese-trained Pembela Tanah Air (PETA) Indonesian units as soon as 18 August. The discharged officers and personnel were then recruited into the Badan Keamanan Rakyat (People's Security Agency, BKR), the new armed forces of the nationalist government. Around late August and early September, some of the nationalist youths (pemuda) began to seize arms from Japanese forces – in some cases involving murder, but largely through simple disarmament and in some cases voluntarily. Looting against Chinese Indonesians and Eurasians of the city also began to occur.

=== Revolution in Bandung and the 10 October affair ===
The first British forces began arriving in Indonesia by around late September 1945, and by 25 September the nationalist government declared that all Indonesian civil servants were working for them. This resulted in an outburst of seizures of Japanese-controlled buildings and property. Takeovers were initially relatively peaceful, but soon more looting began to occur, primarily of military assets, with pemuda independently planning and launching attacks on Japanese posts or vehicles to capture weapons. By early October, disarmament of Japanese forces began to take a larger scale across the wider region. In some cases, disarmament was negotiated to be held in a mock mass assault against Japanese forces who would "surrender" and disarm in order to absolve Japanese forces of their responsibility to maintain order.

In early October, the Japanese military commander in Bandung, Major General Mabuchi Itsuo, was negotiating a peaceful disarmament of his men. Throughout the first few days of the month, several arms factories and warehouses were seized by nationalists and on 8 October a large group of pemuda took over a Japanese airbase, taking control and disarming its guards with almost no resistance. On 10 October, a large assault by pemuda was launched against the local Kenpeitai headquarters – seemingly spontaneously – and the Japanese responded by calling in commanders of the local BKR for negotiations, before coercing them with bayonets to surrender and disperse the crowds. Throughout the day, the leaders were made to disperse attacks on Japanese posts while the Japanese setup barricades and posts, sweeping throughout Bandung within the following days and effectively retaking control of the city. A week later, the Japanese handed over control of the city to arriving British units of the 37th Indian Infantry Brigade. Following negotiations, British authorities agreed to rearm the Indonesian police.

=== Reescalation of tensions ===
Following the 10 October incident, revolutionary fervor in the city died down for around a month. During this time, the BKR reorganized into the TKR (People's Security Army/Tentara Keamanan Rakyat), with the 3rd division of its 1st army covering the Bandung region under the command of Arudji Kartawinata (former BKR commander of Priangan). The division itself was subdivided into five regiments, two of which were headquartered in Bandung proper (one later moved to the outskirts). Each of these regiments consisted of four battalions, typically comprising 500 to 1,000 men. Aside from these, there were also irregular units of pemuda organizations, ethnic militias, and Hizbullah units under Masyumi. By November, the European population of the city had also began to return, reaching 60,000 by late November or double the pre-WW2 figure (compared to some 436,000 Indonesians, Chinese and Eurasians) with 2,000 British and 1,500 Japanese troops.

On the night of 24 November, the 3rd Division under Kartawinata was pressured by pemuda following the outbreak of the Battle of Surabaya to launch a general attack against British and Japanese troops – which ended up being a relatively limited operation, with only scattered fighting in parts of the city. The following day, an incident occurred when a flash flood killed more than 200 people, with Indonesian units engaging in rescue operations and firefights with British forces during the confusion that occurred. Within the following weeks, fighting intensified across the city with the British calling in an additional battalion of troops in early December, when most of the northern parts of Bandung were under British control. During this time, British supply trains and trucks travelling from Jakarta were subjected to raids – in one occasion, a supply train arrived in Bandung on 21 November looted and without its Gurkha guards.

The British commander issued an ultimatum to the local Indonesian governor demanding Indonesians (numbering some 100,000) to evacuate North Bandung on 27 November – which the governor rejected. Later, the nationalist government compromised, agreeing to move "elements which disturbed peace". In effect, significant civilian movements occurred, due to pressure from European inhabitants backed by British forces. Some form of a boundary eventually formed between Indonesian and British/Indian forces, though there were significant desertions of the Indian troops and the Gurkha units would trade weapons for food items. As the British asserted control over North Bandung, around 100,000 Indonesians evacuated the area between November 1945 and March 1946. During the remaining days of 1945 and in early 1946, a relatively calm period ensued from the stalemate, with pemuda organizations continued to consolidate to form larger entities, and the 3rd Division saw a replacement of Kartawinata with Abdul Haris Nasution as commander.

== Sea of Fire ==
The 23rd Indian Infantry Division was moved to Bandung on 16 February 1946, and some fighting began to erupt again in early March. On 22 March, British authorities notified then-Prime Minister of Indonesia Sutan Sjahrir that they were planning a military operation in Bandung, requesting him to evacuate the city of armed forces to prevent fighting – specifically, the British requested that all armed Indonesian units be removed from an area within eleven kilometers of the city center.

Major General Douglas Hawthorn, commander of the 23rd Division, announced on the radio on the afternoon the following day of the demands, requiring South Bandung to be evacuated of military forces while asking civilians to remain. He set a deadline of midnight the following day for the evacuation. Indonesian leaders such as Nasution requested a delay in the deadline – nominally to organize the movement of people but primarily to move supplies and equipment – but this was rejected by Hawthorn.

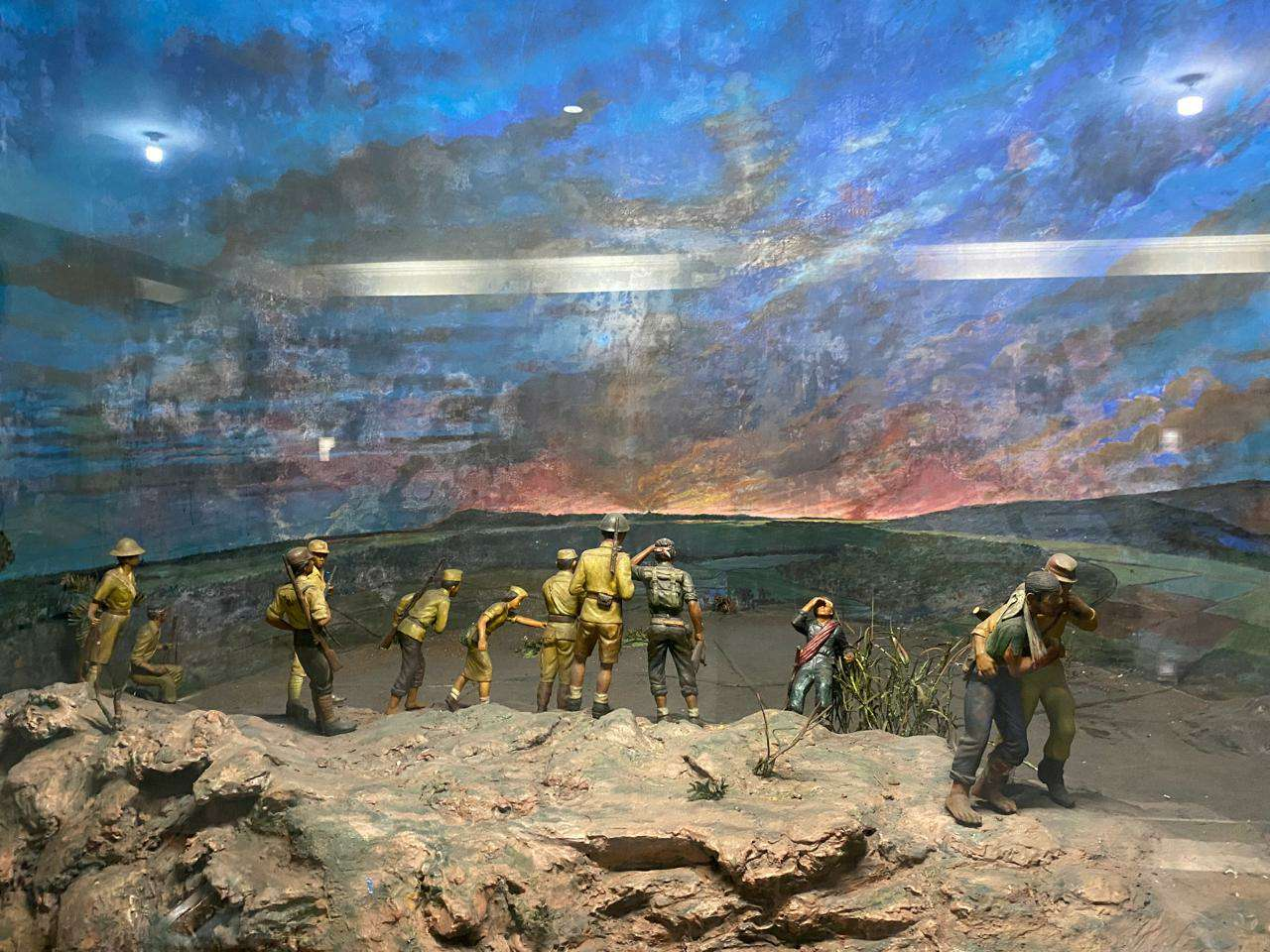
Diorama depicting the burning of Bandung

Faced with evacuation, the regimental commanders in the city opted-in the afternoon the following day for a total general evacuation of South Bandung, in a scorched earth move intended to be a revolutionary gesture. On 4 p.m. that day, Nasution (who had approved of the plan) announced that the entire half of the city was to be evacuated by 8 p.m. – though some scorched earth actions had been conducted as early as the previous evening.

Various figures were given for the affected population within the eleven kilometer limit – from 200,000 given by Merdeka newspaper a month after the event to 500,000 estimated by American historian John Smail (including those living in villages outside Bandung). British historian John Newsinger wrote that a third to half of the city were razed to the ground, and 250,000 were evacuated. As the civilians left the city, the Pemuda started fires and detonated dynamites to destroy the city's buildings – though most of the involved soldiers were inexperienced with demolition and instead opted to loot the warehouses or distribute the contents to the public; most of the flames originated from private homes and lighter buildings. Chinese residents were particularly hard-hit by the looting and burning, and many moved north instead of the countryside.

== Aftermath and legacy ==
The loss of Bandung itself was a significant military and psychological blow to the nationalist government, with the newly arrived Dutch forces being handed control of Bandung from the British on 17 April. American historian John Smail, who visited Bandung 18 months after the event, described South Bandung as "a dead city with grass growing in its streets", though Dutch authorities did not calculate the exact figure of losses. The conflict in the larger area continued, with continued damage in the countryside surrounding Bandung. Commander Nasution, when later questioned on why he did not hold the city, argued that he did not want to sacrifice his units and had opted to conduct guerilla warfare in the city with his still relatively intact battalions. Scorched earth tactics employed in Bandung were later used elsewhere during the revolution by Nasution – and later Army Commander Sudirman, who created the Strategic Order No. 1 (Perintah Siasat No. 1) ordering scorched earth tactics to delay enemy attacks, especially during later Dutch military actions.

In the immediate aftermath of the events, only around 16,000 Indonesians still lived in North Bandung, with "practically none" living in the south, compared to the official figure of 380,000 in August 1945. Though the population of Bandung was estimated as 480,000 in 1945, it fell to around 100,000 by 1946 due to the fighting and the destruction, though it had recovered to over 640,000 by 1950. Despite the massive population displacement of Indonesians, the movement of the Chinese population to the northern parts of the city further complicated the overcrowding already there. This issue became more pronounced after the Darul Islam rebellion in 1948, when a large number of refugees moved to Jakarta and Bandung. When many of the March 1946 evacuees returned to the city, they found their houses occupied by new residents – who in some cases had managed to obtain a residential permit from the government.

During the fires, an Indonesian journalist based in Tasikmalaya recorded the events from a hill in Garut and published an article in the 26 March issue of the Soeara Merdeka newspaper – initially titled Bandoeng Djadi Laoetan Api (Bandung Becomes Sea of Fire), but shortened to Bandoeng Laoetan Api (Bandung Sea of Fire) – the name the event is known by today. This incident inspired Ismail Marzuki, as well as many Indonesian combatants and refugees, to alter the last two sentences of the song Halo, Halo Bandung lyrics to become more patriotic and be able to boost their fighting spirit against British-Dutch forces. Soon after, the song Halo, Halo Bandung became very famous and emerged as a symbol of the struggle of the Indonesian people in their fight for independence from colonial foreign nations. A monument commemorating the event was erected in Bandung in 1981. The Gelora Bandung Lautan Api Stadium, the largest stadium in the province, was named after the event.

== See also ==
- History of Indonesia
- Indonesian National Revolution
- Halo, Halo Bandung
