= Ibu Pertiwi =

National personification of Indonesia

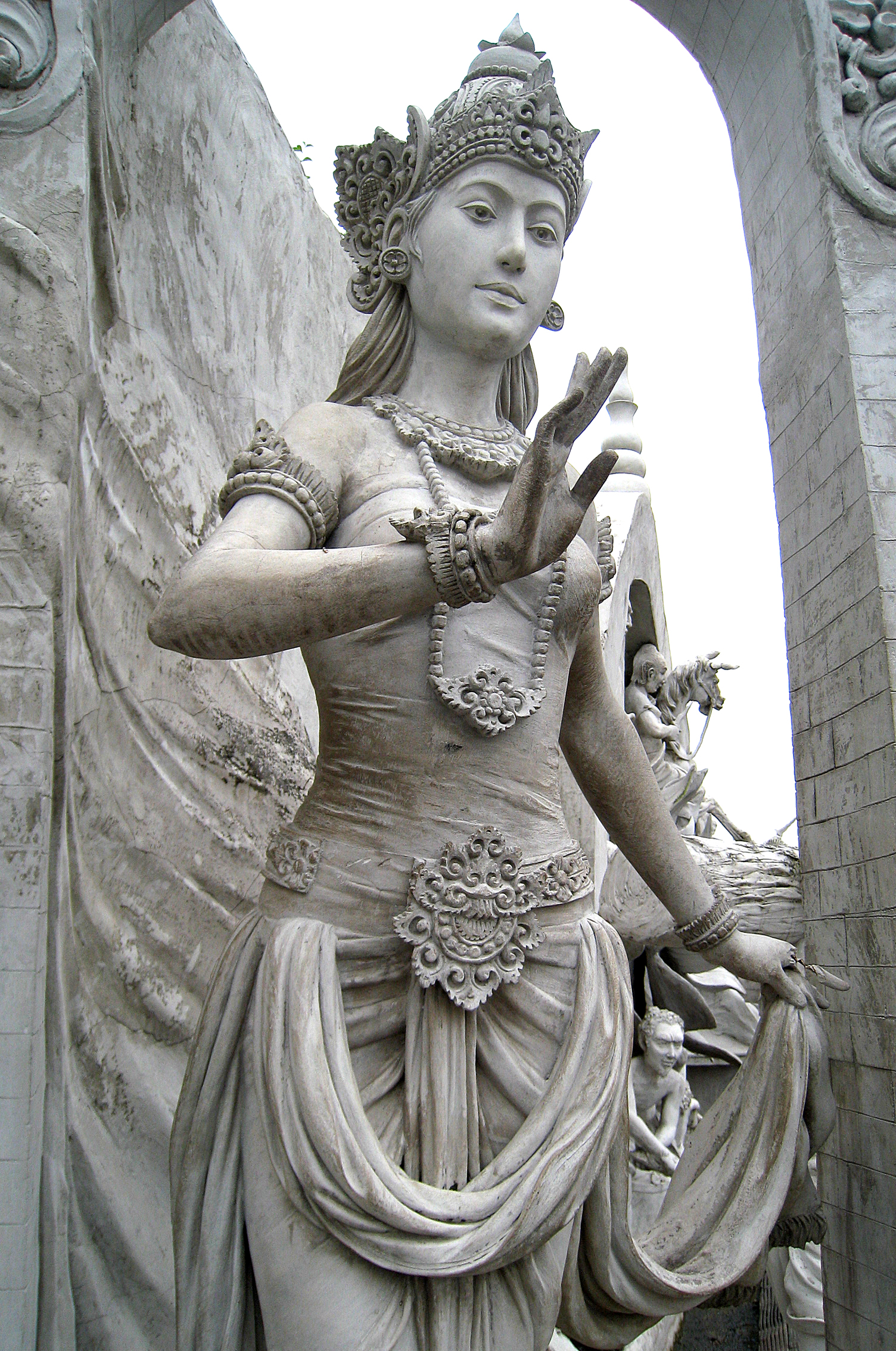
The image of a woman or a goddess in ancient regal attire at Indonesian National Monument, Jakarta. It is probably the most popular depiction of Ibu Pertiwi in Indonesia.

Ibu Pertiwi (lit. 'Mother Prithvi' or 'Mother Earth') is a national personification of Indonesia, the allegory of Land and Water (Indonesian: Tanah Air), the Indonesian motherland. Since prehistoric times, the tribes of the Indonesian archipelago often revered earth and nature spirits as a life giving mother, a female deity of nature. After the adoption of Hinduism in the early first millennium, this mother figure was identified with Prithvi, the Hindu mother goddess of the earth, who was thus given the name "Pertiwi".

== In popular culture ==
Ibu Pertiwi is a popular theme in Indonesian patriotic songs and poems and was mentioned in several of them, such as the song "Ibu Pertiwi" and "Indonesia Pusaka". In the national anthem "Indonesia Raya", the lyrics "Jadi pandu ibuku" ("[is] the scout/guide to my mother") is a reference to Ibu Pertiwi as the metaphorical mother of the Indonesian people. Despite her popularity in patriotic songs and poems, her physical representations and images are rare.

In nationalistic TV commercials commemorating Indonesian independence day, Ibu Pertiwi is often depicted as a beautiful Indonesian maiden lovingly nurturing Indonesian children, such as depicted in a 2017 TV commercial Hari Merdeka special.

In 2017, the Ibu Pertiwi costume won the best national costume in the Miss Grand International beauty pageant.

== See also ==
- Nusantara
- Motherland
