= Van Eldik =

van Eldik is a surname. Notable people with the surname include:

- Matthew van Eldik (born 1970), Australian paralympic athlete
- Mark van Eldik (born 1967), Dutch rally driver
- Willem Mauritius van Eldik (1882–1954), Indonesian music teacher
