= Dari Sabang Sampai Merauke =

Indonesian patriotic song

Dari Sabang Sampai Merauke (English: From Sabang to Merauke) is an Indonesia patriotic song which was created by R. Soerarjo in 1961. The song express that Indonesia is an archipelago with thousands of islands stretching from Sabang, Aceh on the west side and Merauke, South Papua on the east side.

Lyrics of the song Dari Sabang Sampai Merauke were originally created by WR Soepratman, entitled Dari Barat Sampai ke Timur (From West to East). However, the song Dari Barat Sampai ke Timur by WR Soepratman was slowly forgotten and people remembered the song Dari Sabang Sampai Merauke more, which had similarities in seven lines of lyrics and only differed in the first line.

== Lyrics ==
Original

Dari Sabang sampai Merauke
Berjajar pulau-pulau
Sambung menyambung menjadi satu
Itulah Indonesia

Indonesia Tanah Airku
Aku berjanji padamu
Menjunjung Tanah Airku
Tanah Airku Indonesia

Translation

From Sabang to Merauke
The islands are lined up
Connected to become one
That is Indonesia.

Indonesia My Homeland
I promise you
Honoring My Homeland
My Homeland Indonesia
