= Halo, Halo Bandung =

Song performed by Ismail Marzuki

"Halo Halo Bandung"
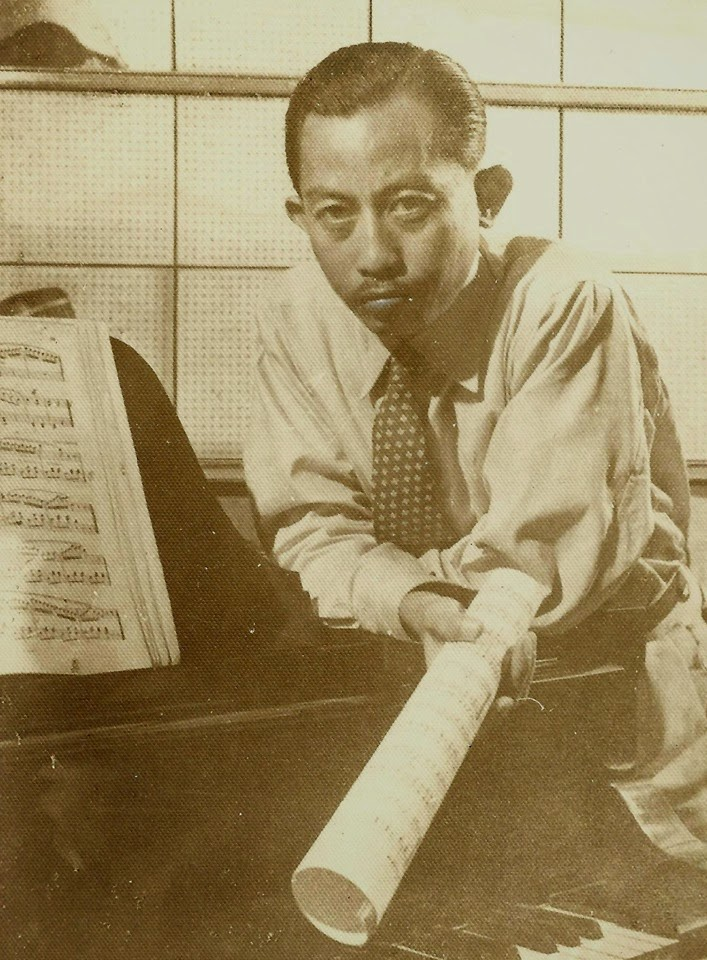
- Indonesian composer Ismail Marzuki

Single by Ismail Marzuki
- Genre: Anthem
- Songwriter: Ismail Marzuki

Halo, Halo Bandung is an Indonesian patriotic song written by Ismail Marzuki that describes the spirit of the struggle of the people of the city of Bandung in the post-independence period in 1946, particularly in the Bandung Sea of Fire that occurred on March 23, 1946.

== Background ==
Ismail Marzuki, then a singer-songwriter of the keroncong group Lief Java, performed regularly with the group in the mid 1930s at Studio Orkes NIROM II in Tegalega, Bandung, as part of the NIROM station's Eastern Programme. Having returned to Batavia after marrying fellow singer Eulis Zuraidah, he kept the sweet memories of the city in his mind. These recollections led him to wrote a song called “Hallo Bandung" in Sundanese, as well as other songs such as "Bandung Selatan di Waktu Malam" and "Saputangan dari Bandung Selatan". The phrase "Hallo Bandoeng" was well known at that time as the call-sign and usual opening used by Radio Kootwijk when establishing a radio-telegraphic connection with Bandung (Dutch: Bandoeng), one of the largest cities in the former Dutch East Indies. It was made famous by Queen Consort Emma when she officially opened the radiotelephone service from Koninklijke PTT Nederland main building in The Hague on January 7, 1929 with the words "Hallo Bandoeng… Hier Den Haag". It quickly escalated even further as a catchphrase since the release of Dutch song "Hallo Bandoeng" by Willy Derby which sold more than 50,000 copies – a record for the time.

This early version of the song lyrics indicated that it was not meant to be a war-related marching song but simply a sentimental song. During the Japanese invasion, the song was translated into Indonesian as part of Japanese propaganda which included the purging of Dutch influence from society and promoting the use of Indonesian throughout the country. However, this second version still reflected its original themes of nostalgia.

Following the surrender of the Japanese in the Dutch East Indies, nationalists fought a four-year Indonesian National Revolution against Dutch NICA and initially the British Commonwealth. Early in this period, Ismail Marzuki and his wife evacuated to Bandung to escape the British-Dutch occupation of Jakarta. Unfortunately, after they settled in Bandung, an ultimatum was given by the British forces for the Indonesian combatants to leave the city. In response, the southern part of Bandung was deliberately razed by nationalists in defiance as they left on 24 March 1946; this came to be known as the Bandung Sea of Fire. This incident inspired Ismail Marzuki, as well as many Indonesian combatants and refugees, to alter the last two sentences of the song to become more patriotic and boost their fighting spirit against British-Dutch forces. Soon after, the song became famous as a symbol of the struggle of the Indonesian people for independence from colonialism.

== Lyrics ==
	Version	Translation
1	Halo, halo Bandung, ibu kota Periangan Halo, halo Bandung, kota inget-ingetan Atos lami abdi patebih, henteu patingal Mugi mugi ayeuna tiasa tepang deui 'tos tepang 'teu panasaran	Hello, hello Bandung, the capital of Periangan Hello, hello Bandung, a city full of memories For so long I'm far away, cannot see Hopefully now we meet again And after that, no more inquisitive feeling
2	Halo, halo Bandung, ibukota Pasundan Hallo-hallo Bandung, kota kenang-kenangan Lama sudah beta ingin berjumpa padamu S'lagi hayat dan hasrat masih dikandung badan Kita 'kan jumpa pula	Hello, hello Bandung, the capital of Pasundan Hello, hello Bandung, a city full of memories For so long already, I want to see you again Whilst my soul and desire remain in my body We will meet again
3	Halo, halo Bandung, ibukota Periangan Halo, halo Bandung, kota kenang-kenangan Sudah lama beta tidak berjumpa dengan kau Sekarang telah menjadi lautan api Mari bung rebut kembali	Hello, hello Bandung, the capital of Periangan Hello, hello Bandung, a city full of memories It has been a long time since I have not seen you Now she has been engulfed in the sea of fire Let's reclaim her, my dearest friends!
