= Gordon Tobing =

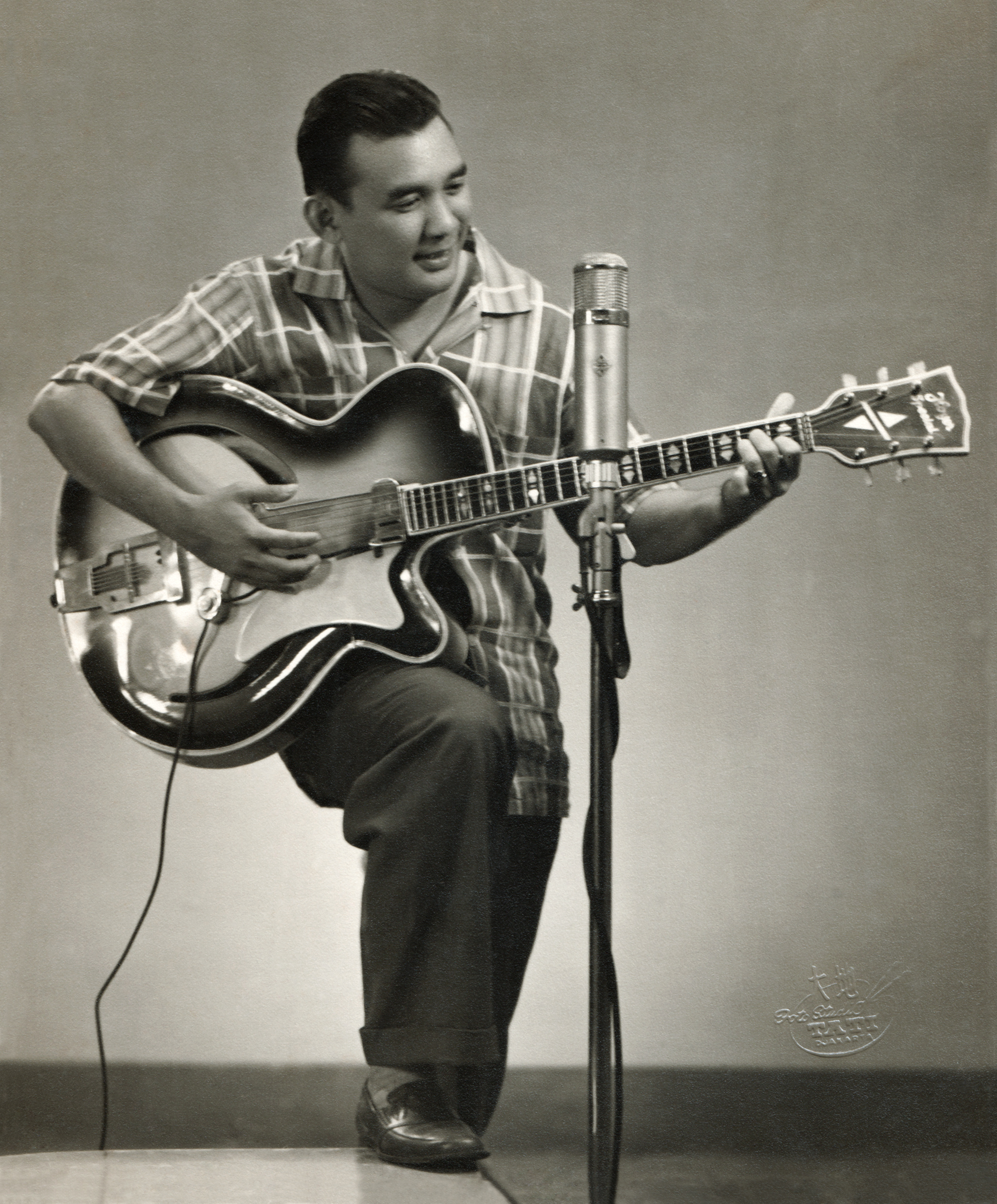
- Born: 27 August 1925; Medan, Dutch East Indies
- Died: 13 January 1993 (aged 67); Jakarta, Indonesia

Gordon Lumban Tobing (27 August 1925 – 13 January 1993) was an Indonesian singer of folk songs, particularly those in the Batak language. Born to a Batak family in Medan, North Sumatra, Tobing moved to Jakarta in 1950 and began working in the entertainment industry. While with Radio Republik Indonesia, he participated in an Indonesian cultural envoy to the 4th World Festival of Youth and Students. Over the remainder of his life Tobing was included in numerous similar envoys, ultimately travelling to five continents.

== Early life ==
Tobing was born in Medan, North Sumatra, on 27 August 1925. He was the second of four children born to Rumulus Lumban Tobing, a musician, and his wife Frieda Hutabarat. As their father and paternal grandfather, Lamsana, were active members of their church congregation, the Tobing siblings (Douglas, Gordon, Nelson, and Adella) grew up in a household where church music was often sung and became interested in music from a young age. All four of the siblings became singers, and Gordon took up the guitar. When Rumulus took a job in Singapore in 1936, the siblings went with him; Gordon lived in the city for two years.

Gordon had only an elementary school education, graduating from a Dutch-language school for indigenous students in Palembang in 1940. His father was working for an oil company there. After graduating, Gordon Tobing went to Tarutung to live with his mother and siblings. In 1942, following the Japanese occupation of the Dutch East Indies, his father came for him and brought Gordon to Plaju, Palembang, to work at the oil company. During this period he also became a member of the Orkes Bunga Rampai musical group, under Iskandar.

Gordon Tobing remained with the oil company until the end of the occupation in 1945. During the ensuing Indonesian National Revolution, he returned to Tarutung and worked at a shop. With his uncle, Remus, and brother Douglas, Gordon established the band Rimba Boys, which played Hawaiian-style music. Gordon played the bass and ukulele, while Douglas performed the vocals.

== Rising musical career ==
In 1950, following Dutch recognition of Indonesia's independence, Gordon Tobing left for the national capital in Jakarta and began working for Produksi Film Negara (PFN), the national film company. When the studio was producing its film Rakjat Memilih (The People Choose), Tobing was asked to find some singers to provide a soundtrack. He brought Soryana, Tiur, and Ellen Hutabarat, the daughters of a distant relative. Using the name Sinondang Tapian Nauli, the trio also performed in hotels in the capital. Tobing began boarding at the Hutabarat house in 1951, though he was told to leave in 1954 after beginning to woo the youngest daughter, Theresia. Her parents, who had already selected a husband for her, did not approve.

In 1951 Tobing left PFN to join Radio Republik Indonesia (RRI), where he remained for four years. Sinondang Tapian Nauli would frequently perform on the radio station during the programmes Panggung Gembira and Sekuntum Melati. In 1953 Tobing travelled with an Indonesian cultural envoy to the 4th World Festival of Youth and Students, held in Bucharest, Romania. At the event he sang "Sinanggar Tulo" and "Embun", as well as "Rayuan Pulau Kelapa". He recorded this last song in the USSR, where it became popular. During bus trips with the cultural envoys, he would often begin playing his guitar and call on his fellows to sing. The dancer Irawati Durban Ardjo recalled that this helped both the envoys and local organizing committees develop a sense of intimacy and familiarity.

After his trip to Bucharest, Tobing returned to Jakarta. Working with fellow RRI employee Sudharnoto, he often performed at events and on the radio. These included several songs he had written himself, including "Di Rondang Ni Bulani" and "Bulan Tula". Despite her parents disapproval, Tobing continued to see Theresia. The couple chose to elope and, on 15 August 1955, Gordon took Theresia from her home with the help of Douglas and a friend named Wim. As Douglas left a false trail leading to Bogor to misdirect Theresia's parents, Gordon took her to Medan via Merak. The couple arrived safely and, on 5 September, they were formally married. The couple had one son, Enrico Caruso.

== Later career and death ==
The couple lived in Medan for several years, and Tobing was involved in the Chinese-led group Sio Ie She. He also established his own band, Suara Harapan, which played on the Medan branch of RRI. However, Tobing grew disappointed with the city, and in 1959 he and Theresia left Medan to return to Jakarta, where they joined a group of non-government Indonesian artists and performers on a tour of Eastern Europe. Over subsequent years he took part in several further cultural envoy programs, including one to the 1964 New York World's Fair. In recognition of his musical abilities, Tobing received a guitar from President Gamal Abdel Nasser of Egypt and another guitar from Fidel Castro. He was also given a medal by Prince Norodom Sihanouk of Cambodia.

In 1960, Tobing and his wife established the Impola vocal group; they worked with Koes Hendratmo for a while, and often performed for state guests. These included Crown Prince Akihito of Japan, for whom Tobing performed a Japanese folk song. Tobing and Hutabarat continued to represent Indonesia as cultural envoys, ultimately travelling to five continents. Tobing also performed for a number of government agencies, including the Indonesian National Police, Bank of Indonesia, and the Bank Dagang Nasional Indonesia (National Trade Bank of Indonesia). He was also called to the Merdeka Palace to perform for President Suharto.

Tobing died in Jakarta at 1:30 a.m. (UTC+7) on 13 January 1993. A memorial gathering was held at the Sahid Hotel in Jakarta the following month.

== Musical style ==
Tobing was self-taught. As such, according to Tempo, the arrangement of his songs was unremarkable and his guitar-playing skills were not spectacular. The magazine attributes his success to his stage presence and ability to bring joy to any occasion. It describes him as surprising audiences by refusing to use a microphone and by walking off the stage and into the watching crowds, carrying his guitar and singing seemingly without any difficulty. He generally performed Batak-language songs, including "Sing Sing So" and "Butet". Jennifer Lindsay, writing in 2012, describes Tobing as immortalizing the former.

Tobing refused to take contract work with hotels or bars, and when he wrote songs he often refused to record or market them. This limited him financially, and he and his family lived with his in-laws in a 3-by-15-metre (9.8 ft × 49.2 ft) house in Kebon Sirih, Jakarta. Tobing would often take the bus rather than take a car, and, when asked to perform at the Krems ad Donau music festival in Austria in September 1981, he had to seek a sponsor as he was unable to afford the ticket.

Tobing only recorded two albums in Indonesia.

== Works cited ==
- Ardjo, Irawati Durban (2012). "New Sundanese dance for New Stages". In Jennifer Lindsay; Maya H.T. Liem (eds.). Heirs to World Culture: Being Indonesian, 1950–1965. Leiden: KITLV Press. ISBN 978-90-6718-379-6.
- "Dengan Medali, Menggendong Gitar" [With a Medal, Cradling a Guitar]. Tempo (in Indonesian). 15 November 1981.
- Lindsay, Jennifer (2012). "Performing Indonesia Abroad". In Jennifer Lindsay; Maya H.T. Liem (eds.). Heirs to World Culture: Being Indonesian, 1950–1965. Leiden: KITLV Press. ISBN 978-90-6718-379-6.
- "Pengawal Musik Rakyat" [Pioneer of Folk Music]. Matra (in Indonesian). May 1993. pp. 96–101.
- Tempo team, ed. (1981). Apa dan Siapa: Sejumlah Orang Indonesia 1981–1982 [Who and What: A Number of Indonesian People 1981–1982] (in Indonesian). Jakarta: Grafiti. OCLC 220021666.
