= Kebyar-Kebyar =

Single by Gombloh

from the album Kebyar-Kebyar
- Released: 1979
- Length: 6:24
- Label: Golden Hand
- Songwriter(s): Gombloh

"Kebyar-Kebyar" (also spelled "Gebyar-Gebyar") is a 1979 patriotic song by the singer Gombloh. In 2009 it was listed by Rolling Stone Indonesia as the second best Indonesian song of all time.

== Themes and styles ==
"Kebyar-Kebyar" deals with heroism and patriotism, two themes common in Gombloh's early work. It also draws heavily on local tradition, reminiscent of Rick Wakeman's work with Yes.

The beat is melodious, with heavy pop influences. The lyrics are reminiscent of traditional syair and are aloof, leading the listener to consider Gombloh is making a statement that his nationalism is inherently a part of his creative process. It is written in 4/4 time.

== Release and reception ==
"Kebyar-Kebyar" was released on the album of the same name, issued by Golden Hand, in 1979. It continues to be used during Independence Day ceremonies in Indonesia, both official and unofficial ones, and on or around 17 August it is often played on the radio and television. The Indonesian pop singer Fariz RM writes that "Kebyar-Kebyar" is the only pop song which receives this treatment in the country.

In its December 2009 issue, Rolling Stone Indonesia listed "Kebyar-Kebyar" as the second best Indonesian song of all time. Denny MR, in the write-up, described the song as Gombloh's most monumental work, deriving its strength from its "melodic" beat, one which went against the common "heroic" beat used in other patriotic songs. Another of Gombloh's songs, "Berita Cuaca", was ranked 98th. Asrat Ginting, in his overview of Indonesian music, writes that whoever sings the song tends to perform full of emotion; Ginting suggests it may be nationalism, or may be the pride of being on stage.
