= Annie Landouw =

Indonesian keroncong singer and film actress

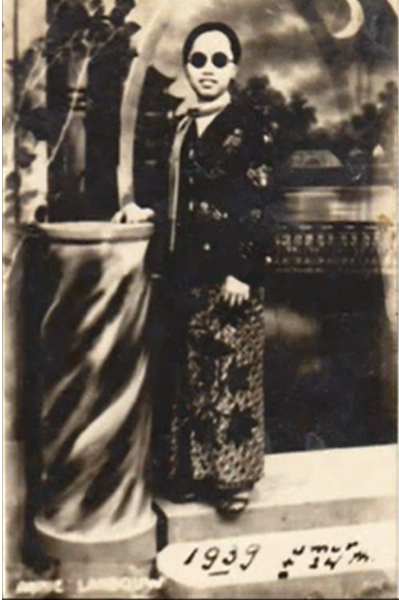
- 1939 promotional still
- Born: 1913; Soerakarta, Dutch East Indies
- Died: 17 August 1982
- Other names: Annie Landauw
- Occupations: Keroncong singer; Film actress

Annie Landouw (also Landauw, 1913 – 17 August 1982) was an Indonesian keroncong singer and film actress.

== Biography ==
Landouw was born in Surakarta, Central Java, in 1913. She lost her sight following an extended illness as a child, and was not long afterwards adopted by her aunt and uncle. In 1927 she competed in – and won – her first singing competition, a Concours concert at a night fair in Surakarta. As a result, she was approached by Beka, a recording company, which signed her. She moved to Batavia (now Jakarta), the capital of the Dutch East Indies, soon afterwards and quickly rose in popularity.

By 1938 Landouw had joined the NIROM radio troupe, singing keroncong. The following year she joined Hugo Dumas' troupe Lief Java. During this period she became active in film. In 1938 she provided vocals for Fatima, a production by Tan's Film; she provided vocals again for Tan's 1939 film Gagak Item (Black Raven). She made her onscreen debut later that year, with Siti Akbari. In 1940 she appeared in two further films, Sorga Ka Toedjoe (Seventh Heaven) and Roekihati.

Landouw's prowess singing keroncong rendered her immensely popular. In 1940, the blind singer was scheduled for eye surgery. Her fans organised a fundraising campaign to help her pay for it, although ultimately Landouw refused the charity.

After Indonesia's independence, Landouw continued singing; however, she acted in no further films. She died on 17 August 1982.

== Legacy ==
Music scholar Peter Keppy suggests that, because of her popularity as a keroncong singer, Landouw may have influenced the character of Yah in Armijn Pane's 1940 novel Belenggu; in the novel, Yah is famous as a keroncong singer under the stage name Siti Hayati.

== Works cited ==
- Apa Siapa Orang Film Indonesia [What and Who: Film Figures in Indonesia] (in Indonesian). Jakarta: Indonesian Ministry of Information. 1999. OCLC 44427179.
- "Annie Landouw". filmindonesia.or.id (in Indonesian). Jakarta: Konfiden Foundation. Archived from the original on 6 January 2014.
- "Fatima". filmindonesia.or.id (in Indonesian). Jakarta: Konfidan Foundation. Archived from the original on 2 December 2013.
- "Gagak Item". Bataviaasch Nieuwsblad (in Dutch). Batavia: Kolff & Co. 19 December 1939. p. 3. Archived from the original on 6 January 2014.
- Keppy, Peter (2008). "Keroncong, Concours, and Crooners: Home-grown Entertainment in Early Twentieth-century Batavia". In Boomgaard, P.; Kooiman, Dick; Nordholt, Henk Schulte (eds.). Linking Destinies: Trade, Towns and Kin in Asian History. Verhandelingen van het Koninklijk Instituut voor Taal-, Land- en Volkenkunde. Vol. 256. pp. 141–58. ISBN 978-90-6718-320-8.
- Mohamad, Goenawan (20 April 1985). "Yah". Tempo (in Indonesian). Archived from the original on 4 March 2016.
