= Sudharnoto =

Indonesian composer and musician

Sudharnoto (1925–2000) was an Indonesian composer and musician best known for the song Garuda Pancasila (1956), Asia Afrika Bersatu (1962) and numerous film scores. As a leader in the Communist-affiliated artists' organization LEKRA during the 1950s and 1960s, he was imprisoned by the New Order after 1966, but was later rehabilitated and returned to composing.

== Biography ==
Sudharnoto was born in Kendal, Semarang Residency, Dutch East Indies (today in Central Java, Indonesia) on 24 October, 1925. He came from a musical family but never studied music in a formal setting; his mother played the accordion and his father, a doctor, played guitar, flute, and viola. As a youth, Sudharnoto studied traditional arts like Gamelan and wayang kulit before exposure to gramophone music expanded his interests to include in Western-style music and Kroncong. During 1936–39 he played guitar in a number of Hawaiian music ensembles while continuing his studies on piano and gamelan. He studied medicine at University of Indonesia in Jakarta in the late 1940s, but left his studies after a year to work as a pianist and Hammond organ player at Radio Republik Indonesia (RRI). He gave regular radio performances during the first half of the 1950s with his Quartet Sudharnoto, as well as leading a choral group Ansambel Gembira for some time in the early 1950s. During his time working at RRI, he was able to study orchestration and musical technique with fellow employees such as Amir Pasaribu and R. A. J. Sudjasmin, Maladi and Soetedjo, as well as with Dutch musicians such as Jos Cleber.

Sudharnoto was promoted to head of music at RRI in 1952. He joined LEKRA, the communist-affiliated artists' organization, when it was founded in 1950, attending its inaugural conference in Jakarta in July of that year. This affiliation allowed him to make a number of music exchange trips to the Soviet bloc. During this era he wrote a number of propaganda songs such his best known work Garuda Pancasila (1956), which continued to be used by the Suharto regime for decades, as well as left-wing anthems like Asia-Afrika Bersatu (1962). He became chair of the Lembaga Musik Indonesia, a new music organization under LEKRA, in 1964 and delivered an address at its inaugural conference in Jakarta in October of that year.

In 1965, he was removed from his position at RRI and arrested during the anticommunist crackdown during the Transition to the New Order. He was held as a political prisoner in Salemba Special Detention Center in Jakarta. He was rehabilitated in 1969 and released, although due to the anticommunist politics of the Suharto regime, he never regained his previous prominence. He worked as a pianist in various restaurants in Jakarta to earn a living. He subsequently turned his attention to composing film scores, with his peak period of activity being in the 1970s and early 1980s. Among his soundtracks were for Anak Emas (1976), Koboi cilik (1977), Pendekar Kelelawar (1978), Kabut Sutra Ungu (1979) and R. A. Kartini (1982) by Sjumandjaja.

He died in Jakarta on 11 January 2000.
