= Willem Mauritius van Eldik =

Music teacher (1882–1954)

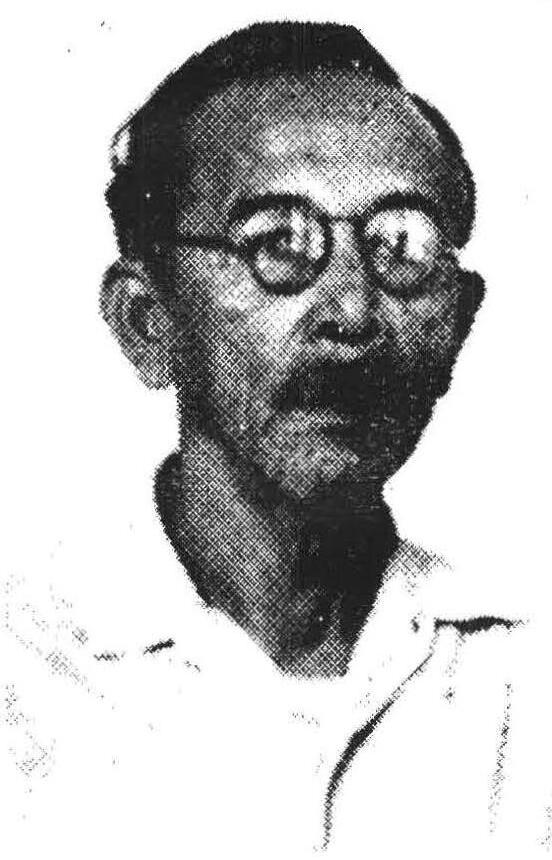
- Born: June 10, 1882; Ngantru, Tulungagung, Dutch East Indies
- Died: May 5, 1954 (aged 71); Tulungagung, East Java, Indonesia
- Other names: Sastrodihardjo
- Occupation(s): Music teacher, KNIL Instructor
- Known for: Teacher of W.R. Supratman

Willem Mauritius van Eldik (sometimes spelled as Van Eldick), also known as Sastrodihardjo (June 10, 1882 – May 5, 1954) was a music teacher who was the teacher of Wage Rudolf Supratman. In addition, van Eldik also became W.R. Supratman's brother-in-law.

== Biography ==
Willem Mauritius van Eldik was born in Bendosari Village, Ngantru District, Tulungagung. Van Eldik was the child of a father of Dutch (Indo) descent who lived in Darungan hamlet, while his mother was a native from Ngantru. He also had a sibling named M.B.F. van Eldik, who is buried next to him. Besides working as a music teacher, he was also a sergeant instructor for the Royal Netherlands East Indies Army (KNIL) Battalion XIX, and served in Surabaya.

Van Eldik gave a violin as a gift to his student W.R. Supratman on his 17th birthday. With this violin, Supratman, who received his knowledge of musical arts from van Eldik, created the national anthem Indonesia Raya.

== Death ==
He died on May 5, 1954. Sastrodiharjo was originally buried in the “bong londo” or Dutch cemetery, south of the current grave.

Then the grave was moved to the Ngujang Village TPU location where it remains today.

== Family ==
Sastrodihardjo first married Rukiyem, the older sister of WR Supratman. From this marriage Sastrodihardjo had no children.

He then married Tumijah. From this marriage four children were born, namely Nanik Yatrini, Hani Purwanto, Yunarso and Subartono.
