= Gombloh =

Indonesian singer and songwriter

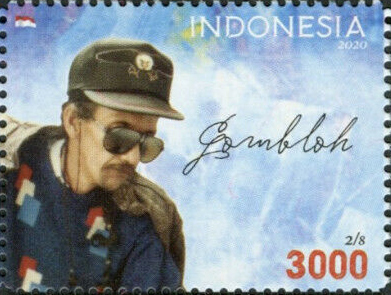
- Gombloh on a 2020 stamp of Indonesia

Background information
- Born: Soedjarwoto Soemarsono; July 14, 1948; Jombang, East Java, Indonesia
- Died: January 9, 1988 (aged 39) Surabaya, East Java, Indonesia
- Genres: Pop
- Label: Nirwana Records

Soedjarwoto Soemarsono (July 14, 1948 – January 9, 1988), better known by his stage name Gombloh, was an Indonesian singer and songwriter. He received the Nugraha Bhakti Musik Indonesia award from the Association of Singer Artists, Songwriters and Recording Music Arrangers of the Republic of Indonesia (Indonesian: Persatuan Artis Penyanyi, Pencipta Lagu dan Penata Musik Rekaman Republik Indonesia – PAPPRI).

== Biography ==
=== Early life ===
Gombloh was born as Soedjarwoto Soemarsono in Jombang on July 14, 1948. His parents were Slamet and Tatoekah. He studied at Senior High School (SMAN) 5 Surabaya. After graduating he continued his studies at the Tenth of November Institute of Technology.

=== Career ===
He moved to Bali after quitting his studies and became a street performer. After that, he joined the symphonic rock band, Lemon Tree's Anno '69, which was influenced by ELP and Genesis. They released Sekar Mayang, a Javanese-language album, aside from their several Indonesian-language albums.

In 1982, Gombloh released the album Gombloh Berita Cuaca. In 1983, he released Gila under Nirwana Records, which boosted his popularity; however, these early albums were not very successful commercially. Live concerts with French singer Eric Vincent (Surabaya, Jakarta TVRI shows...).

In 1984, he released 1/2 Gila (Half Crazy). In 1986, Apel (Date [verb]) and Semakin Gila (Crazier) were released. Apel featured his most commercially successful song, "Kugadaikan Cinta" ("I Pawn My Love"). In 1987, his last solo album, Apa Itu Tidak Edan (Is it Not Crazy) was released.

=== Death ===
He died in Surabaya on January 9, 1988, due to lung disease. It has been attributed to his habit of staying up late and smoking.

== Style and appearance ==
Gombloh was different from other musicians. Asrat Ginting writes that some felt he was not worth watching, as he just wore white clothes, shoes without socks, dark glasses and a hat. Rolling Stone Indonesia also notes that Gombloh had a limited stage persona, looking as if he were constantly ill.

According to Rolling Stone Indonesia, Gombloh's songwriting style was similar to Rick Wakeman in that he drew on local culture and nature; among elements that he used were traditional songs and wayang. His lyrics were generally not confrontative, without being overly critical or grateful.

The themes of most of his music were humanity, patriotism, natural beauty, heroism and humor. Other songs, such as "Berita Cuaca" ("Weather Report"), "Hong Wilaheng Sekareng Bawono Langgeng", "Denok-Denok Debleng", "Ujung Kulon Baloran", "3600 Detik" ("3600 Seconds"), "Kebayan-Kebayan", "Hitam Putih" ("Black and White") and "Kami dan Alam" ("We and Nature"), gave his perspective on social life. However, "Kugadaikan Cintaku" ("I Pawn My Love") was commercially successful, which has been described by Rolling Stone Indonesia as a symbol of idealism losing to pressure.

His songs about patriotism and heroism include "Dewa Ruci", "Gugur Bunga" ("The Fallen Flower"), "Gaung Mojokerto-Surabaya" ("Mojokerto-Surabaya Echo"), "Indonesia Kami" ("Our Indonesia"), "Indonesiaku Indonesiamu" ("My Indonesia, Your Indonesia"), "Pesan Buat Negeriku" ("Message for My Country") and "BK". He also wrote social phenomena songs, including "Doa Seorang Pelacur" ("Prayer of A Prostitute"), "Kilang-Kilang" ("Refineries"), "Poligami-Poligami" ("Polygamies"), "Nyanyi Anak Seorang Pencuri" ("Singing of Son of A Thief") and "Selamat Pagi Kotaku" ("Good Morning My City").

== Legacy ==
In 1996, several artists from Surabaya formed the Solidaritas Seniman Surabaya (Surabaya Artists Solidarity) to commemorate Gombloh. They also created a bronze statue of him and placed it at Taman Hiburan Rakyat Surabaya. On March 30, 2005, Gombloh received the Nugraha Bhakti Musik Indonesia award from Persatuan Artis Penyanyi, Pencipta Lagu dan Penata Musik Rekaman Indonesia.

In 2009, Rolling Stone Indonesia listed two of Gombloh's songs, "Kebyar-Kebyar" and "Berita Cuaca", as some of the best Indonesian songs of all time. "Kebyar-Kebyar", ranked second, was noted as being played every year in the national celebration for the Independence Day ceremonies. "Berita Cuaca", ranked 98th, was called extremely dramatic in its comparison of children playing and dead forests.

== Bibliography ==
- "150 Lagu Indonesia Terbaik Sepanjang Masa" [150 Best Indonesian Songs of All Time]. Rolling Stone Indonesia (in Indonesian) (56). Rolling Stone: 32–103. 2009. Songs discussed on pages 36 and 84.
- Ginting, Asrat; et al. (2009). Musisiku. Jakarta: Republika. ISBN 978-979-1102-52-0.
