= Saridjah Niung =

Ibu Soed
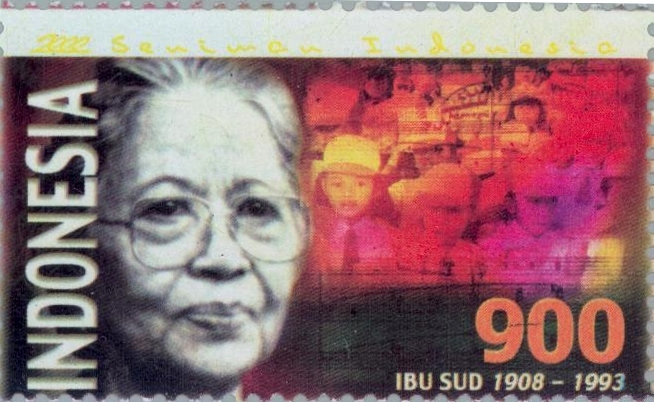
- Born: Saridjah Niung; 26 March 1908; Sukabumi, Dutch East Indies
- Died: 12 December 1993 (aged 85); Jakarta, Indonesia
- Citizenship: Indonesian
- Occupation: Musician
- Years active: 1927–1993
- Spouse: Raden Bintang Soedibjo
- Children: Sri Sufinati
- Parent: Mohammad Niung

Saridjah Niung, also known as Ibu Soed, Ibu Sud, or Mrs. Soed (26 March 1908 – 12 December 1993) was an Indonesian musician, teacher, radio announcer, playwright, and batik artist. She composed music for children as well as patriotic hymns. During the Dutch colonial years, she composed music about the Japanese occupation and Indonesia’s independence. She also wrote the Indonesian patriotic hymns "Tanah Airku" ("My Homeland") and "Berkibarlah Benderaku" ("Fly, My Flag").

On 26 March 2017, Google celebrated her 109th birthday with a Google Doodle.
