= Lief Java =

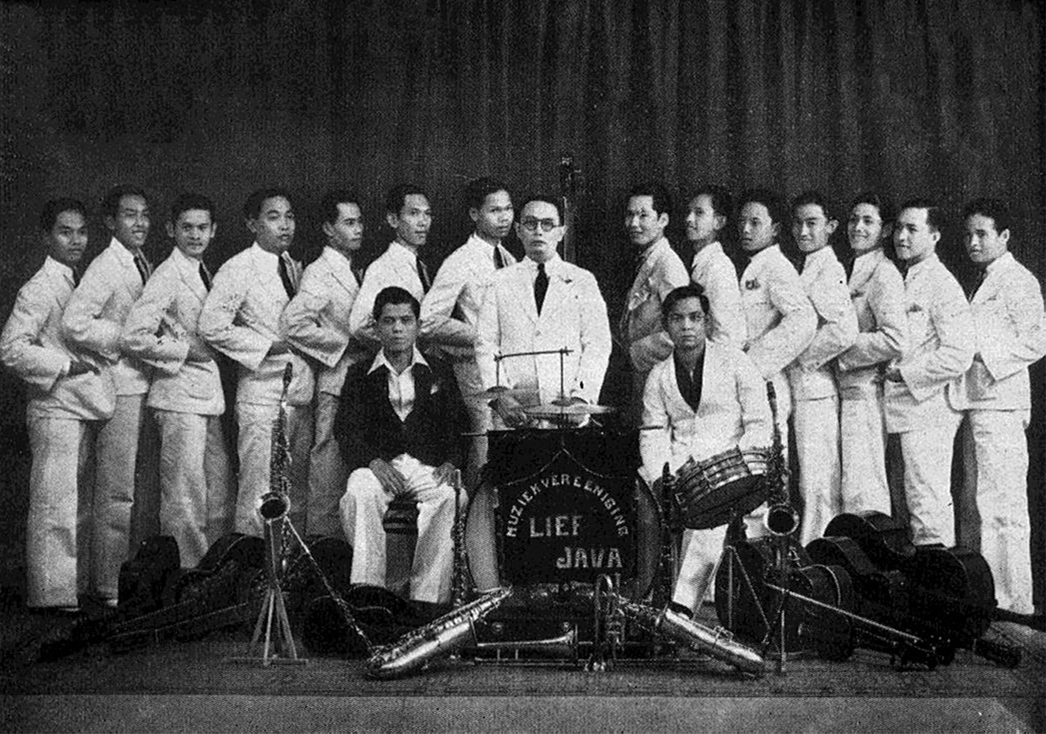
Lief Java keroncong (above) and jazz divisions, 1936

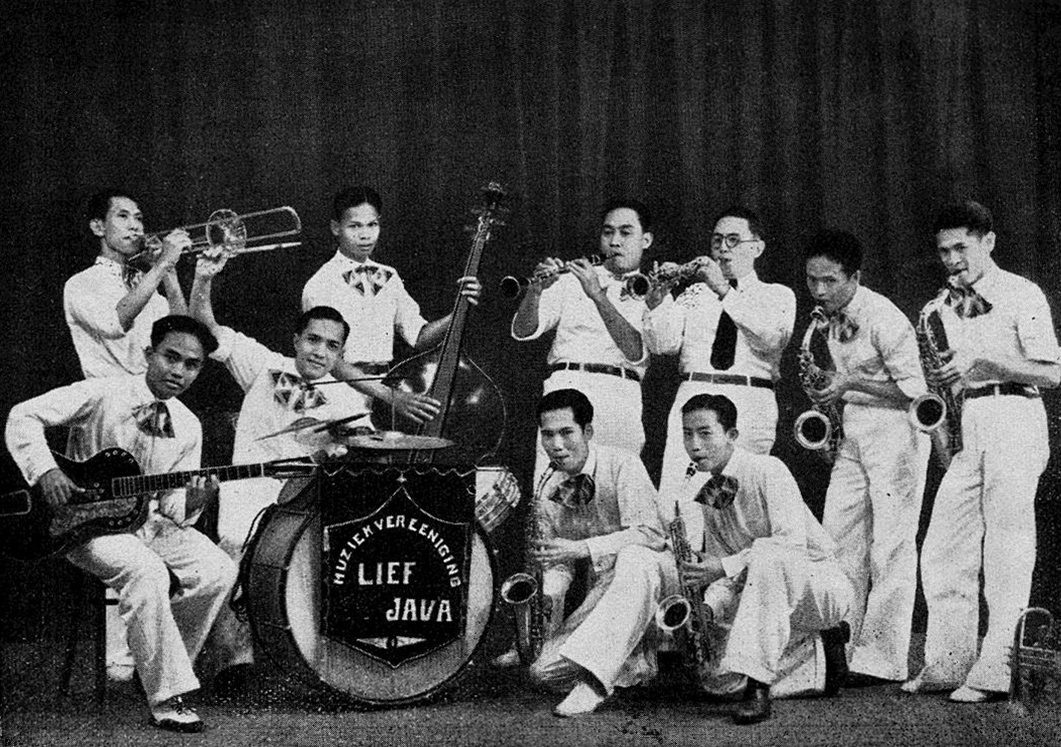

Lief Java (literally "Sweet Java") was an orchestra in the Dutch East Indies (now Indonesia). It was one of the first keroncong groups in the colony.

== Members ==
Various musicians are recorded as having been part of the Lief Java orchestra. This includes Ismail Marzuki, a singer-cum-songwriter known for his nationalist works; the blind singer Annie Landouw; and the theatrically-trained husband and wife team Kartolo and Roekiah. Other members included Hugo Dumas, Atjep, and Miss Netty.

== History ==
Lief Java was established in 1918 by Soewardi as the Rukun Anggawe Santoso Orchestra before changing its name to Lief Java in 1923. The orchestra used a variety of instruments, including cellos, flutes, guitars, and violins. Most of the artists were amateurs, with little previous experience. The orchestra practiced in Kampung Kepuh, Kemayoran, Batavia (now Jakarta), in the home of musician S. Abdullah, and played a variety of songs, both originals and arrangements or adaptations. The company had two musical divisions, keroncong and jazz.

Sometime after 1925, after Dutch entrepreneurs established NIROM, Lief Java began playing music over the radio as part of the station's Eastern Programme. This helped the orchestra to grow in popularity and reach new audiences outside of Batavia. Ultimately, however, the orchestra left NIROM owing to concerns over the use of their intellectual property; NIROM appropriated a song they had composed for use in opening all of their broadcasts. Thus, sometime after 1937 the orchestra quit NIROM and joined the rival station VORO (Vereeniging voor Oostersche Radio Omroep), playing live every Saturday. By the mid 1930s Hugo Dumas was the orchestra's leader.

In 1938 Lief Java completed its first film score, working for Tan's Film on its production Fatima. As Roekiah was the main star of Tan's, the orchestra was retained to score the company's later releases. This included Gagak Item (1939) and Siti Akbari (1940). Some of the orchestra's singers, such as Kartolo and Landouw, joined the company as actors. The orchestra also toured; one trip, to Borneo in 1939, is known to have been a commercial success.

During the Japanese occupation of the Dutch East Indies, the troupe changed their name from the Dutch Lief Java to the Japanese Kireina Djawa. During this period the orchestra performed live on several occasions, and their songs became increasingly pro-East Asian. The orchestra was still in existence in 1949.

== Legacy ==
An article in Pedoman Radio described the orchestra as "the 'mother' of the vocal and musical arts of Indonesia" ("'Ibu' seni-suara dan seni-musik Indonesia").

== Works cited ==
- "Annie Landouw". filmindonesia.or.id (in Indonesian). Jakarta: Konfiden Foundation. Archived from the original on 6 January 2014.
- Apa Siapa Orang Film Indonesia [What and Who: Film Figures in Indonesia] (in Indonesian). Jakarta: Indonesian Ministry of Information. 1999. OCLC 44427179.
- Esha, Teguh; Alhaziri, Wasmi; Fauzi, Muhammad; Donald W., Sabu; Sigarlaki, Erwin R. (2005). Ismail Marzuki: Musik, Tanah Air, dan Cinta [Ismail Marzuki: Music, Homeland, and Love] (in Indonesian). Yogyakarta: LP3ES. ISBN 978-979-3330-36-5.
- "Fatima". filmindonesia.or.id (in Indonesian). Jakarta: Konfidan Foundation. Archived from the original on 2 December 2013.
- "Gagak Item". Bataviaasch Nieuwsblad (in Dutch). Batavia: Kolff & Co. 19 December 1939. p. 3.
- Imong, W. (July 1941). "Riwajat Roekiah–Kartolo" [History of Roekiah–Kartolo]. Pertjatoeran Doenia Dan Film (in Indonesian). 1 (2). Batavia: 24–26.
- "Ismail Marzuki". Encyclopedia of Jakarta (in Indonesian). Jakarta City Government. Archived from the original on 6 January 2014.
- "Lief Java". Encyclopedia of Jakarta. Jakarta City Government. Archived from the original on 6 January 2014.
- "Siti Akbari". filmindonesia.or.id (in Indonesian). Jakarta: Konfidan Foundation. Archived from the original on 3 November 2013.
- Yampolsky, Philip Bradford (2013). Music and media in the Dutch East Indies: Gramophone records and radio in the late colonial era, 1903–1942 (Thesis). Seattle: University of Washington.
