= Indonesia Pusaka =

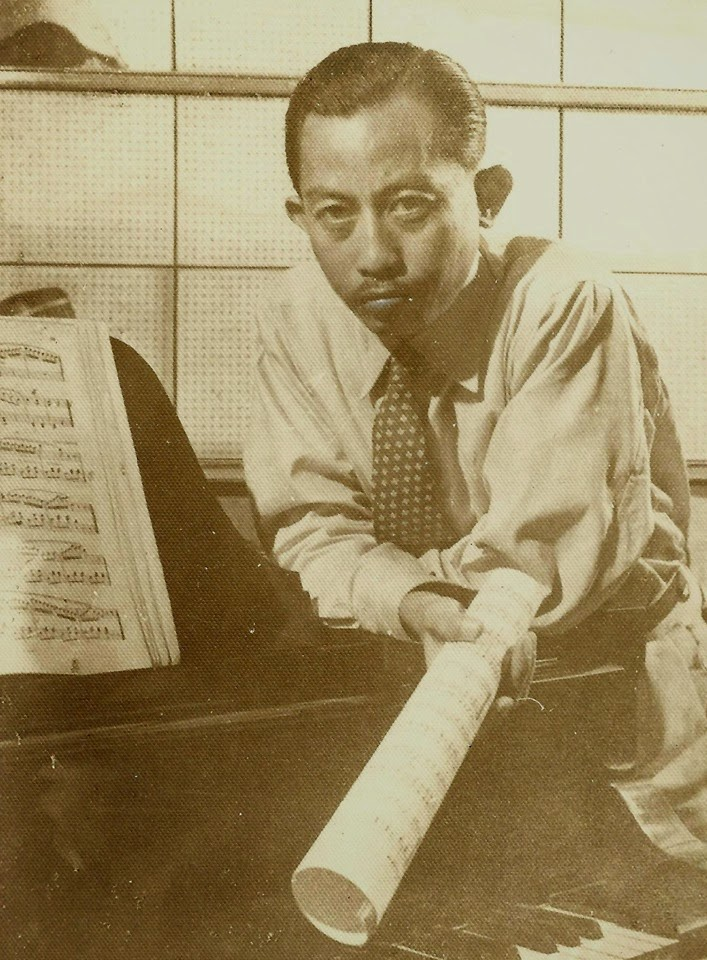
- Indonesian composer Ismail Marzuki

Single by Ismail Marzuki (writer)
- Genre: Anthem
- Songwriter: Ismail Marzuki

Audio sample
- file; help

"Indonesia Pusaka" (English: Indonesia, the Heritage) is a patriotic song composed by Ismail Marzuki. It is usually performed on Indonesian Independence Day celebrations, in university graduation ceremonies, and as a closing broadcast in several television stations at midnight. The song’s motif is Indonesia, as a ‘homeland’ or ‘motherland’, and how Indonesians will fight for her with all of their might. This song is the favorite patriotic song of Mohammad Hatta, one of the founding fathers of Indonesia.

== Lyrics ==
First verse:

Indonesia tanah air beta
Pusaka abadi nan jaya
Indonesia sejak dulu kala
Tetap dipuja-puja bangsa

Reff:

Di sana tempat lahir beta
Dibuai, dibesarkan bunda
Tempat berlindung di hari tua
Tempat akhir menutup mata

Second verse:

Sungguh indah tanah air beta
Tiada bandingnya di dunia
Karya indah Tuhan Maha Kuasa
Bagi bangsa yang memujanya

Reff:

Indonesia ibu pertiwi
Kau kupuja, kau kukasihi
Tenagaku bahkan pun jiwaku
Kepadamu rela kuberi

== Lyrics' translation in English ==
First Verse:

Indonesia, my homeland
An everlasting and glorious treasure
Indonesia, since time immemorial
Always praised by nations

Refrain:

There, I was born
Nurtured, raised by mother
A place of refuge in old age
A final place to close my eyes

Second verse:

Indonesia, thou art beautiful
No other lands can compare
The work of the Lord Almighty
For a nation that praises Him

Refrain:

Indonesia, motherland dear
I adore thee, I love thee
All my strength, my life even
I pledge to thee, my homeland.

== Other uses ==
The song is often performed by spectators at international football events (such as AFC or AFF matches) involving the Indonesian team, usually at the end of the match.

Along with the national anthem, the song is sometimes also sung by university students during political protests and demonstrations, with the most recent one being the 2025 protests.

== See also ==
- Indonesia Raya
