= Bangun Pemudi-Pemuda =

"Bangun Pemudi Pemuda"

Single by Alfred Simanjuntak (writer)
- Genre: National song
- Songwriter: Alfred Simanjuntak

"Bangun Pemudi Pemuda" is an Indonesian patriotic song which was written by Alfred Simanjuntak, and to date, the song is played, as in every celebration of Independence on 17 August and Youth Pledge on 28 October.

== History ==
The melody of Bangun Pemudi Pemuda was taken from the school march of the Sekolah Rakyat Sempurna Indonesia (lit. the Indonesian School for the Perfection of the People), the tune of which was also composed by Simanjuntak. Simanjuntak argued that the people of Indonesia needed to experience a nascent spirit of patriotism, other than just the six grades at the SRSI. The song's title (Pemudi-Pemuda, lit. Youth Girls and Youth Boys) was derived from the fact that several European languages use the fixed order of "ladies and gentlemen", including Dutch, and that inspired Simanjuntak to put a Pemudi in front of the Pemuda (usually the only term used in Indonesian for 'youth'.) Simanjuntak was put on a hit list by the Japanese military police as a direct result of this song, but it was never carried out, and he discovered the fact after independence.

== Lyrics ==
Original

Bangun pemudi-pemuda Indonesia
Tangan bajumu singsingkan untuk negara
Masa yang akan datang kewajibanmulah
Menjadi tanggunganmu terhadap nusa
Menjadi tanggunganmu terhadap nusa

Sudi tetap berusaha jujur dan ikhlas
Tak usah banyak bicara, t'rus kerja keras
Hati teguh dan lurus. Pikir tetap jernih
Bertingkah laku halus, hai putra neg'ri
Bertingkah laku halus, hai putra neg'ri

Translation

Arise o youth of Indonesia
Roll up your sleeves to serve your country
The coming days are yours to bear
Your responsibility for the homeland
Your responsibility for the homeland

Keep working in honesty and sincerity
No need for talks, keep working hard
Heart, firm and straight. Mind, clear
Act compassionately, O youth of the country
Act compassionately, O youth of the country

== Recordings ==
In 1998, Addie MS conducted the Twilite Chorus performing "Bangun Pemudi-Pemuda", backed by the Victorian Philharmonic Orchestra of Australia. The recording was included on Addie's studio album Simfoni Negeriku. A 2006 recording of the song, arranged by Steve Handoyo and performed by the Semarang-based Surya Children Choir, was featured on the compilation album Kumpulan Lagu Wajib.

== See also ==
- Indonesia Raya
