= Rayuan Pulau Kelapa =

Indonesian song

Rayuan Pulau Kelapa (Solace on Coconut Island), also known as Indonesië, Ik hou van jou (Indonesia, I Love You) in the Netherlands, is an Indonesian song written by Ismail Marzuki (1914–1958), who wrote a number of popular tunes in the country's early post-independence period. The lyrics praise Indonesia's natural beauty, such as its floral-related double entendres, islands and beaches, and profess undying love for the country.

The song is a nostalgic favourite among Indonesian expatriates, particularly those who left the country for the Netherlands in the 1940s and 1950s, after independence.

The 2016 mashup "Satu Indonesiaku" consists of this song, "Zamrud Khatulistiwa", "Kolam Susu" and "Pemuda".

== Lyrics ==
Indonesian	English (unofficial)
Tanah airku Indonesia; Negeri elok amat kucinta Tanah tumpah darahku yang mulia Yang kupuja sepanjang masa Tanah airku aman dan makmur Pulau kelapa yang amat subur Pulau melati, pujaan bangsa Sejak dulu kala Melambai-lambai nyiur di pantai Berbisik-bisik raja kelana Memuja pulau yang indah permai Tanah airku, Indonesia!	My homeland Indonesia; The beautiful country that I loved most The glorious blood-spilled land of mine That I will adore forever My safe, and prosperous homeland The fertile coconut island The jasmine island coveted by nations Ever since a long time ago Waving softly the coconut trees on the coast Whispering softly the calming breeze Praising the island that is so beautiful and lovely My homeland, Indonesia!

== Recordings ==
A recording of the song by Gordon Tobing was popular in the USSR in the 1950s. The song was extremely popular among Russians, was arranged by the Soviet Composer Vitaly Geviksman and performed in Russian by the singer Maya Golovnya (Russian text by V. Korchagin). In 1956, the song recorded in Polish under the name "Indonezja" by Polish singer Janusz Gniatkowski. In 1956, the song recorded in Chinese under the name "Ye Dao Gu Niang" (traditional Chinese: 椰島姑娘; simplified Chinese: 椰岛姑娘; lit. 'Coconut Island Girl') by Macanese singer Poon Sow-keng. In 1958, the song recorded in Finnish under the name "Indonesia" by Estonian opera singer Georg Ots. In 1980, the song recorded in Dutch under the name "Indonesië, ik hou van jou" by Dutch singer Anneke Grönloh. A 1998 recording by Twilite Chorus was included on Addie MS' compilation album Simfoni Negeriku. In 2005, "Rayuan Pulau Kelapa" was sampled by Indonesian comedy vocal group Project Pop in their song "Indovers". It was performed again by Indonesian rock band Endank Soekamti in 2015.

== Uses in media ==
The ending bars of the song is played as an interval signal on RRI Programa 3.

During the New Order era, TVRI played the song as its sign-off tune each night.
