= Bhinneka Tunggal Ika (song) =

Indonesian national song

Single by Binsar Sitompul, A Thalib (Writer)
- Genre: Anthem
- Songwriter(s): Binsar Sitompul, A Thalib

Bhinneka Tunggal Ika (transl. "Unity in Diversity" (Different but One)) is an Indonesian national song that was created by Binsar Sitompul and A. Thalib.
