= Gugur Bunga =

Single by Ismail Marzuki (writer)
- Released: 1945
- Genre: Anthem
- Songwriter: Ismail Marzuki

"Gugur Bunga di Taman Bakti" (Flower has Fallen in the Field of Duty), better known as "Gugur Bunga", is an Indonesian patriotic song written by Ismail Marzuki in 1945. Written to honor the Indonesian soldiers killed during the Indonesian National Revolution, it tells of the death of a soldier, and the singer's feelings. It has since become a common song for protests and funerals. The song's line gugur satu, tumbuh seribu (one falls, a thousand arise) has entered common Indonesian vernacular.

== Writing ==
"Gugur Bunga" was written by Ismail Marzuki in 1945 at the beginning of the Indonesian National Revolution. It was written in honour of the Indonesian soldiers who died fighting the Dutch colonial army. During the war, an estimated 45,000 to 100,000 Indonesians died in combat, with civilian casualties exceeding 25,000, possibly as many as 100,000.

== Lyrics and structure ==
Original

Betapa hatiku takkan pilu
Telah gugur pahlawanku
Betapa hatiku takkan sedih
Hamba ditinggal sendiri

Siapakah kini plipur lara
Nan setia dan perwira
Siapakah kini pahlawan hati
Pembela bangsa sejati

Reff :
Telah gugur pahlawanku
Tunai sudah janji bakti
Gugur satu tumbuh seribu
Tanah air jaya sakti

Gugur bungaku di taman bakti
Di haribaan pertiwi
Harum semerbak menambahkan sari
Tanah air jaya sakti

Translation

How can I not feel sorrow
My hero has passed
How can I not feel sad
I am left all alone

Who can be my solace
Loyal and brave
Who can be my heart's hero
A true defender of the people

Reff :
My hero has passed
His service is done
One falls, a thousand arise
For our great and sacred homeland

My flower has fallen in the garden of devotion
On the lap of our Motherland
The fragrance pervades the essence
Of our great and sacred homeland

"Gugur Bunga" is performed andante moderato in 4/4 time.

== Reception ==
"Gugur Bunga" is seen as a mournful, patriotic song about the death of a soldier fighting his enemy. As such, it has become a well-known nationalistic song in Indonesia, being covered by numerous artists. It is also considered a compulsory song for students to learn, along with "Indonesia Raya, "Satu Nusa Satu Bangsa", and "Bagimu Negeri".

"Gugur Bunga" has also become the government's funeral anthem: they are almost always, if not always, played during state funerals, such as during the state funerals of former Indonesian president Abdurrahman Wahid, former President Suharto, former President B. J. Habibie, former First Lady Siti Hartinah, former First Lady Ainun Habibie, former First Lady Ani Yudhoyono, and veteran reporter Rosihan Anwar.

After the death of four students in the 1998 Trisakti shootings, the media used the lyrics gugur satu, tumbuh seribu as a slogan for the reformation movement and to indicate that the students had not died in vain. Today the line gugur satu, tumbuh seribu has entered common usage, with the meaning of "One falls, a thousand arise".

== Bibliography ==
- Friend, Theodore (2003). Indonesian Destinies. The Belknap Press of Harvard University Press. ISBN 0-674-01834-6.
- G., William; Yanti, Lay K. (2006). Kumpulan Lagu Wajib [A Collection of Compulsory Songs] (in Indonesian). Jakarta: Kawan Pustaka. ISBN 979-757-120-3. OCLC 298399164.
- Ismail, Gunawan (2007). Kumpulan Lagu Nasional: Persembahan untuk Indonesiaku [A Collection of Nationalistic Songs: A Dedication to My Indonesia] (in Indonesian). Depok, Indonesia: Puspa Swara. ISBN 978-979-1133-71-5. OCLC 213362031.
- Muchlis, BA; Azmy, BA (1992). Lagu-Lagu untuk Sekolah Dasar dan Lanjutan I: Lagu Wajib [Songs for Primary and High Schools I: Compulsory Songs] (in Indonesian). Depok, Indonesia: Musika.
- Torchia, Christopher (2007). Indonesian Idioms and Expressions: Colloquial Indonesian at Work. Singapore: Tuttle. ISBN 978-0-8048-3873-3.
