= Ismail Marzuki =

Indonesian composer of patriotic songs (1914–1958)

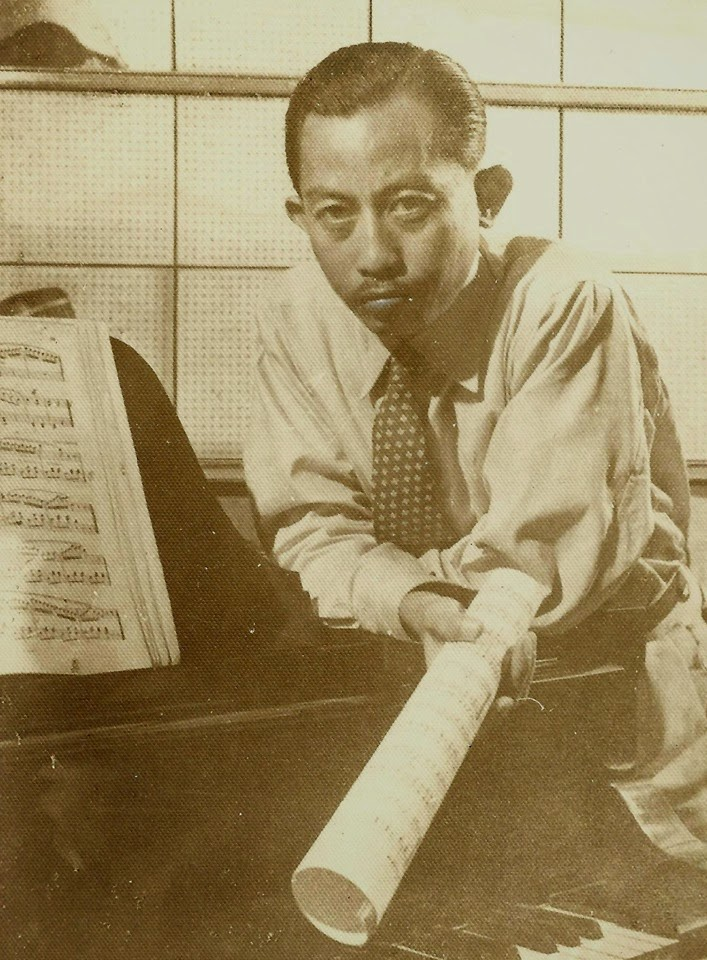
- Ismail Marzuki, unknown year

Background information
- Born: 11 May 1914; Batavia, Dutch East Indies
- Died: 25 May 1958 (aged 44) Jakarta, Indonesia
- Occupations: Composer, songwriter
- Years active: 1931–1958

Ismail Marzuki (also known as Bang Ma'ing; 11 May 1914 – 25 May 1958) was an Indonesian composer, songwriter and musician who wrote around 202 to 240 songs between 1931 and 1958, including numerous popular patriotic songs. Among his best-known works are "Halo, Halo Bandung", "Gugur Bunga", and "Rayuan Pulau Kelapa". In 1968, he was honoured with the creation of the well-known Taman Ismail Marzuki (the Ismail Marzuki Park, often called TIM) which is a cultural centre in Menteng in central Jakarta. In 2004 he was declared one of the National Heroes of Indonesia.

== Biography ==
Marzuki was born in Kwitang, Jakarta (formerly known as Batavia) to a wealthy Betawi family. His father Marzuki owned an automobile repair shop, and played the rebana; his mother died while giving birth to him. From a young age Marzuki enjoyed music, listening to songs repeatedly on the family's gramophone and learning to play the rebana, ukulele, and guitar.

Marzuki studied at an elementary school for Native Indonesians, the HIS (Hollandsch Inlandsche School) in Menteng; he later attended the Dutch-language middle school MULO (Meer Uitgebreid Lager Onderwijs) on Mendjangan Street (now Kwini I Street) in Jakarta. He became fluent in Indonesian, English, and Dutch. He also studied religion at Unwanul Wustha Madrasah. However, he did not study music formally, instead learning by himself.

In 1931, he wrote his first song, "O Sarinah", which was about a suffering people. During his career he wrote between 202 and 204 songs. Among his most famous compositions are "Halo, Halo Bandung, "Rayuan Pulau Kelapa" (1944, Solace on Coconut Island), "Gugur Bunga di Taman Bakti" (1945, Flower has Fallen in the Field of Duty), and "Selendang Sutera" (1946, A Coil of Silk).

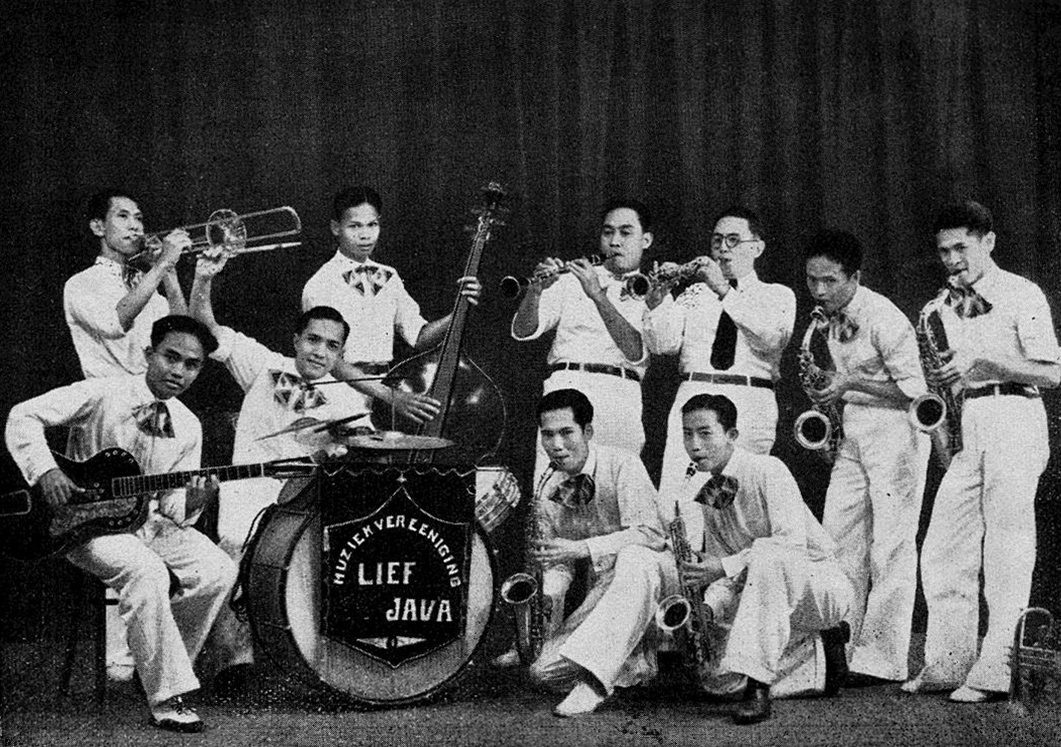
Ismail Marzuki (bottom right, playing saxophone) with The Jazz Division of Lief Java Orchestra, 1936.

Marzuki started his music career by joining the Lief Java Orchestra by the mid 1930s. During this time he performed regularly with the group at Studio Orkes NIROM II in Tegalega, Bandung, as part of the NIROM (Nederlandsch-Indische Radio-omroepmaatschappij) station's Eastern Programme. Sometime around 1937 the group left NIROM and joined the rival station VORO (Vereeniging voor Oostersche Radio Omroep), playing live every Saturday. Afterwards he led the Jakarta Studio Orchestra, the Bandung Studio Orchestra, and later the Hoso Kanri Kyoku orchestra during the Japanese occupation of the Dutch East Indies.

In 1957 he wrote his last song, "Inikah Bahagia" (Is This Happiness). He died at 14:00 on 25 May 1958 in his house in Tanah Abang, Jakarta. He is buried in Karet Bivak Cemetery.

== Style ==
Marzuki's anthems are full of patriotism and love for Indonesia, with a spirit of unity and harmony. They are easy to remember, with simple lyrics and melodies. The scales are generally mid-range, making the songs easier to sing.

== Personal life ==
Marzuki married Eulis Zuraidah, a Sundanese keroncong singer and orchestra member from Bandung, in 1940. His wife became the inspiration of his Sundanese song "Panon Hideung", which is the Sundanese version of Dark Eyes. He re-arranged the song in new lyrics but with the same title in Sundanese ("Panon Hideung" literally means "Black Eyes").

Marzuki enjoyed collecting musical instruments. His collection included guitars, mandolins, flutes, clarinets, saxophones, accordions, and a piano.

He was known for being fiercely nationalistic, once selling gado-gado with his wife instead of cooperating with the Dutch-Allied NICA (Nederlandsch-Indische Civiele Administratie) during the Indonesian National Revolution. However, he also had a romantic side, writing songs like "Kalau Anggrek Berbunga" (c. 1942–1945, When the Orchid Blossoms), "Jauh di Mata Di Hati Jangan" (1947), Far from the Eyes (But Not the Heart) and "Siasat Asmara" (1948, Love's Tactics).

== Legacy ==
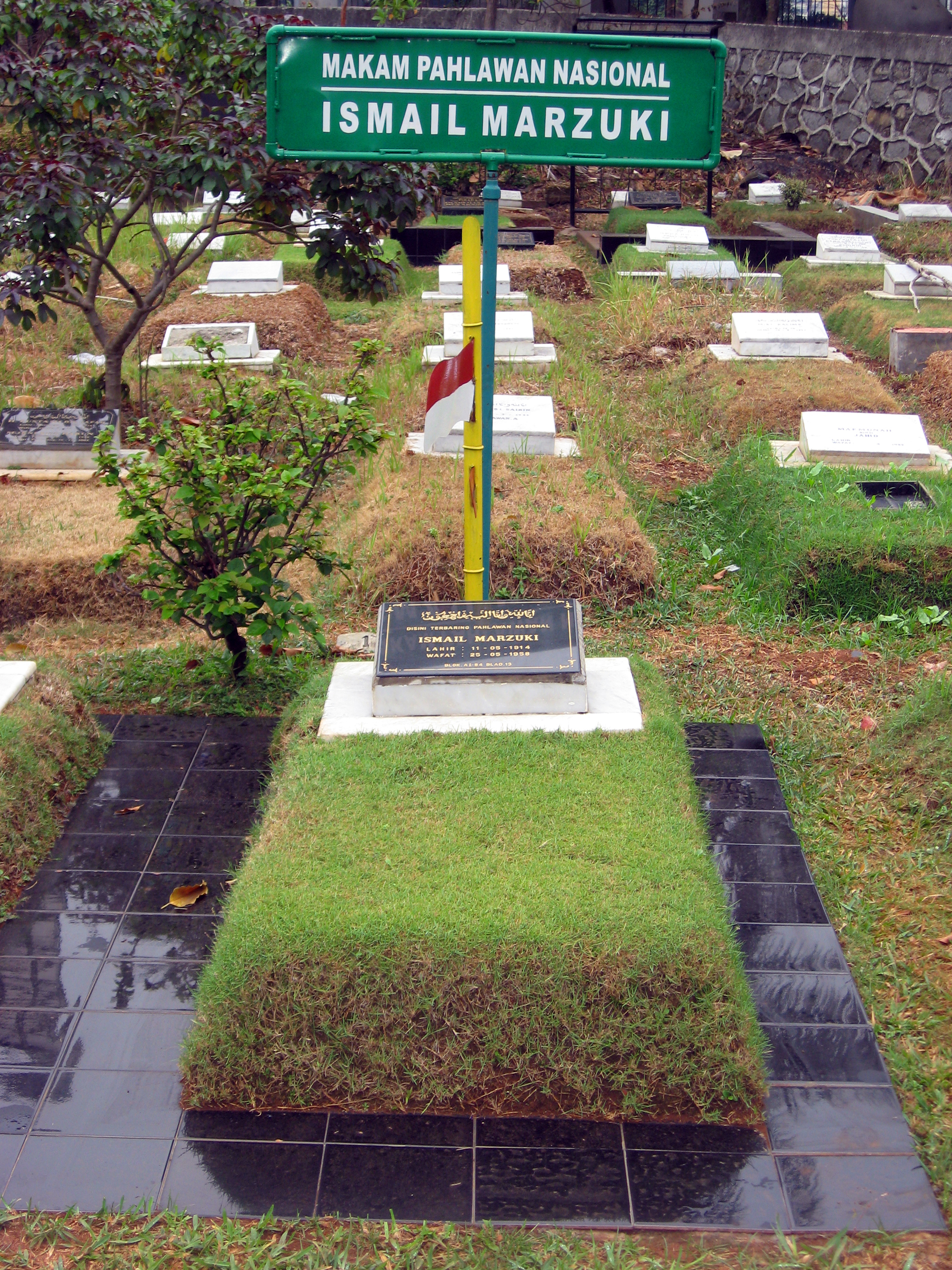
Marzuki's grave in Karet Bivak Cemetery

Marzuki has been described as "having good instincts for music", as well as a "genius" and "legendary". Besides as a piano, saxophone, guitar, accordion, and harmonium player, he was also well known as a singer with a heavy and deep baritone voice which some of his friends gave him nickname "Bing Crosby from Kwitang".

A large number of Marzuki's songs have been rerecorded and released in different genres, including pop music and keroncong, such as "Kr. Pasar Gambir dan Stambul Anak Jampang" (Kroncong of Gambir Market and Stambul of the Cowlicked Child) which was covered by Chrisye on the album Dekade with arrangement by Erwin Gutawa. Several of his songs, including "Halo, Halo Bandung", "Gugur Bunga", "Melati di Tapal Batas", "Selendang Sutra", "Pahlawan Muda", and "Rayuan Pulau Kelapa", are considered compulsory and taught in schools.

Classical composer Ananda Sukarlan has made virtuoso music for piano and/or orchestra based on his songs such as Selendang Sutra, Indonesia Pusaka and Rayuan Pulau Kelapa.

On 16 August 1961 Marzuki received the first Wijaya Kusuma award from President Sukarno. He was honoured posthumously in 1968 with the opening of Taman Ismail Marzuki, a cultural centre and park in central Jakarta. He was recognized as a National Hero of Indonesia in November 2004 by declaration of President Susilo Bambang Yudhoyono.

== List of composed songs ==
- Aryati
- Bandaneira
- Bandung Selatan di Waktu Malam (1948)
- Beta dan Ayunda
- Gagah Perwira (1944)
- Gita Malam
- Gugur Bunga
- Halo Halo Bandung
- Indonesia Pusaka (1940)
- Inikah Bahagia
- Jangan Ditanya
- Jauh di Mata Di Hati Jangan
- Juwita Malam
- Kalau Anggrek Berbunga (Als de orchideeën bloeien)
- Karangan Bunga dari Selatan
- Kasim Baba
- Kasih Putus di Tengah Jalan
- Keroncong Serenata
- Lenggang Bandung
- Melati di Tapal Batas (1947)
- O Angin Sampaikan Salamku
- O Kopral Jono
- Diambang Sore
- O Sarinah (1931)
- Panon Hideung (1936-1937)
- Patah Cincin
- Payung Fantasi
- Rayuan Pulau Kelapa
- Rindu Lukisan
- Roselani
- Sabda Alam
- Sampul Surat (1943)
- Saputangan dari Bandung Selatan
- Sejuta Bintang
- Selamat Datang Pahlawan Muda (1949)
- Selendang Sutra
- Sepasang Mata Bola (1946)
- Setangkai Bunga Mawar (1943)
- Siasat Asmara
- Sumbangsihku (1946)
- Wanita
- Dari Mana Datangnya Asmara
- Ibu Pertiwi

== Bibliography ==
- Sw, Hardani (September–December 2006). "Ismail Marzuki: Komponis Lagu-Lagu Perjuangan" [Ismail Marzuki: The Composer of Patriotic Songs]. Harmonia (in Indonesian). VII (3). Yogyakarta: Institut Seni Yogyakarta: 58–66.
- G., William; Yanti, Lay K. (2006). Kumpulan Lagu Wajib [A Collection of Compulsory Songs] (in Indonesian). Jakarta: Kawan Pustaka. ISBN 979-757-120-3. OCLC 298399164.
- Esha, Teguh; Alhaziri, Wasmi; Fauzi, Muhammad; W, Sabu Donald; Sigarlaki, Erwin R. (2005). Ismail Marzuki: Musik, Tanah Air, dan Cinta [Ismail Marzuki: Music, Indonesia, and Love] (in Indonesian). Jakarta: Pustaka LP3ES. ISBN 979-3330-36-8.
