= Wage Rudolf Supratman =

Indonesian creator of the national anthem (1903–1938)

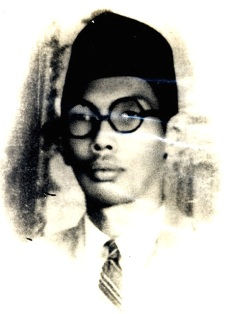
- Born: Wage Rudolf Soepratman; 9 March 1903; Batavia, Dutch East Indies
- Died: 17 August 1938 (aged 35); Soerabaja, Dutch East Indies
- Resting place: his tomb in Surabaya, East Java
- Occupation: Composer
- Parent(s): Djoemeno Senen Sastrosoehardjo alias Abdoelmoein (father); Siti Senen (mother)

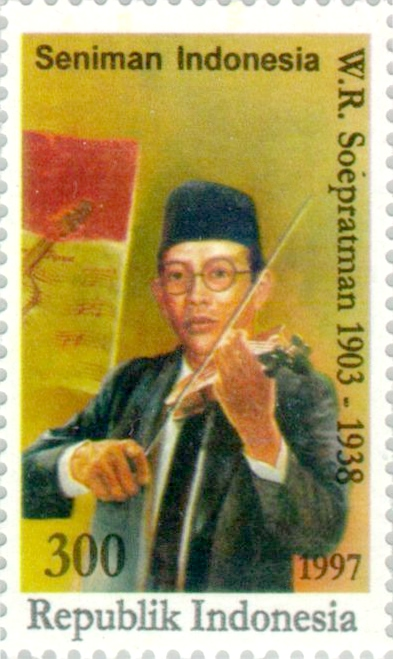
Soepratman in Stamp

Wage Rudolf Supratman (Wage Soepratman in the old orthography, commonly known as W. R. Supratman; 9 March 1903 – 17 August 1938) was an Indonesian journalist and songwriter who wrote both the lyrics and melody of the national anthem of Indonesia, "Indonesia Raya". He is an Indonesian national hero.

== Biography ==
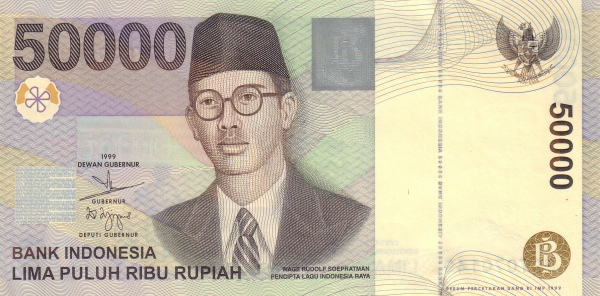
Wage Rudolf Soepratman featured in the 50,000-rupiah banknote.

W.R. Soepratman's father was Sergeant Djoemeno Senen Sastrosoehardjo, a KNIL soldier, and his mother was Siti Senen. Soepratman was born Wage on 9 March 1903 in Jatinegara, Jakarta. Several months later, his father added Soepratman to his name and explained that he was born in Meester Cornelis, Batavia. Soepratman was the seventh of nine children. His eldest sibling was Rukiyem Supratiyah van Eldik.

At the age of 6, he entered Budi Utomo elementary school in Cimahi. After his father retired, Wage followed his sister Rukiyem to Makassar, where he began attending a Europeesche Lagere School (ELS) in 1914. It was then when Rudolf was added to his name, so that his rights would be equal to the Dutch. However, he was asked to leave the school after it was revealed that he was not of European descent. He continued his studies in a Malay language school. After returning home, he learned to play guitar and violin. His brother-in-law, Willem Mauritius van Eldik, gave him a violin as a seventeenth birthday present in 1920. After graduating from Malay language school in 1917, Wage attended Dutch language courses and graduated in 1919. He continued to Normal School, or Teachers' College, and became an auxiliary teacher in Makassar after he graduated.

In 1920, he and van Eldik founded a jazz-styled band, called Black & White. He played the violin. They performed at weddings and birthday parties in Makassar.

Beginning in July 1933, Wage started to feel ill. In November 1933, he resigned as a journalist at Sin Po and settled first in Cimahi, then Palembang, and finally in Surabaya. On 17 August 1938, he died at 01.00 a.m. and was buried in Kenjeran, Surabaya. On 13 March 1956, his remains were moved to Tambak Segaran Wetan cemetery.

== Indonesia Raya ==
Wage composed both the music and lyrics for the song "Indonesia Raya", which later became Indonesia's national anthem. It was introduced during the Second Indonesian Youth Congress on 28 October 1928. The song was quickly adopted by Sukarno's PNI.

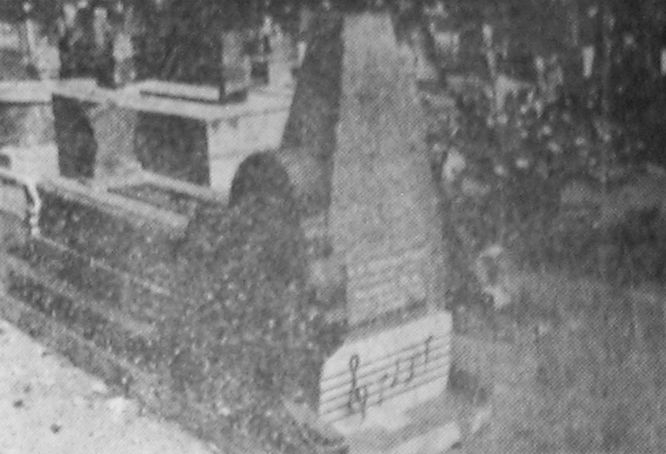
Grave of Soepratman

In 1929, the prominent Indonesian businessman and record executive Tio Tek Hong contacted Supratman; the two agreed to issue the first records of the anthem with Supratman retaining its copyright. The new records were extremely popular, but in 1930 the Dutch colonial authorities placed a ban on the song and confiscated all remaining unsold records. The text was revised in November 1944, and the melody arranged to its present musical form in 1958.

== Legacy ==
The government awarded Wage the National Hero title and the Bintang Mahaputra Utama kelas III in 1971. Several Indonesian cities and towns have named streets after Wage, usually referred to as Jalan WR Soepratman.

== Personal life ==
Wage belonged to the Ahmadiyya Muslim community. He was buried in a Muslim ceremony in Kapas Public Cemetery, Tambaksari, Surabaya.
