= Amir Pasaribu =

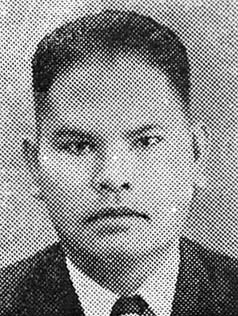
Amir Pasaribu in 1954

Amir Hamzah Pasaribu (21 May 1915 – 10 February 2010) was an Indonesian composer, pianist, cellist, cultural critic and music pedagogue. He was one of the first Indonesians to study classical music abroad and was very active in music composition, education and performance during the first two decades of Indonesian independence, and he founded the Indonesian Musician's Union (Ikatan Pemusik Indonesia). During the New Order period he left Indonesia for Suriname where he worked as a music teacher and orchestral musician, returning to Indonesia in 1996.

== Biography ==
=== Early life and education ===
Pasaribu was born in the village of Siborong-borong, North Sumatra, Dutch East Indies on 21 May 1915. He was born into an upper class Batak family; his father, Mangaradja Salomon Pasaribu, was a government official (assistant wedana). He was also musically literate and had published one of the first books about music in the Batak language and played a Pump organ; he passed on an interest in Western music to Amir, playing German marches and classical music for him on a gramophone. Amir was educated in a Dutch-language Hollandsch-Inlandsche School in Tapanuli (Narumonda and Sibolga) as well as Catholic mission schools, before graduating from a Meer Uitgebreid Lager Onderwijs school in Padang in 1931 and in Tarutung in 1933. It was during his time in those schools that he was exposed more broadly to Western Classical music from his Dutch teachers and took violin and piano lessons.

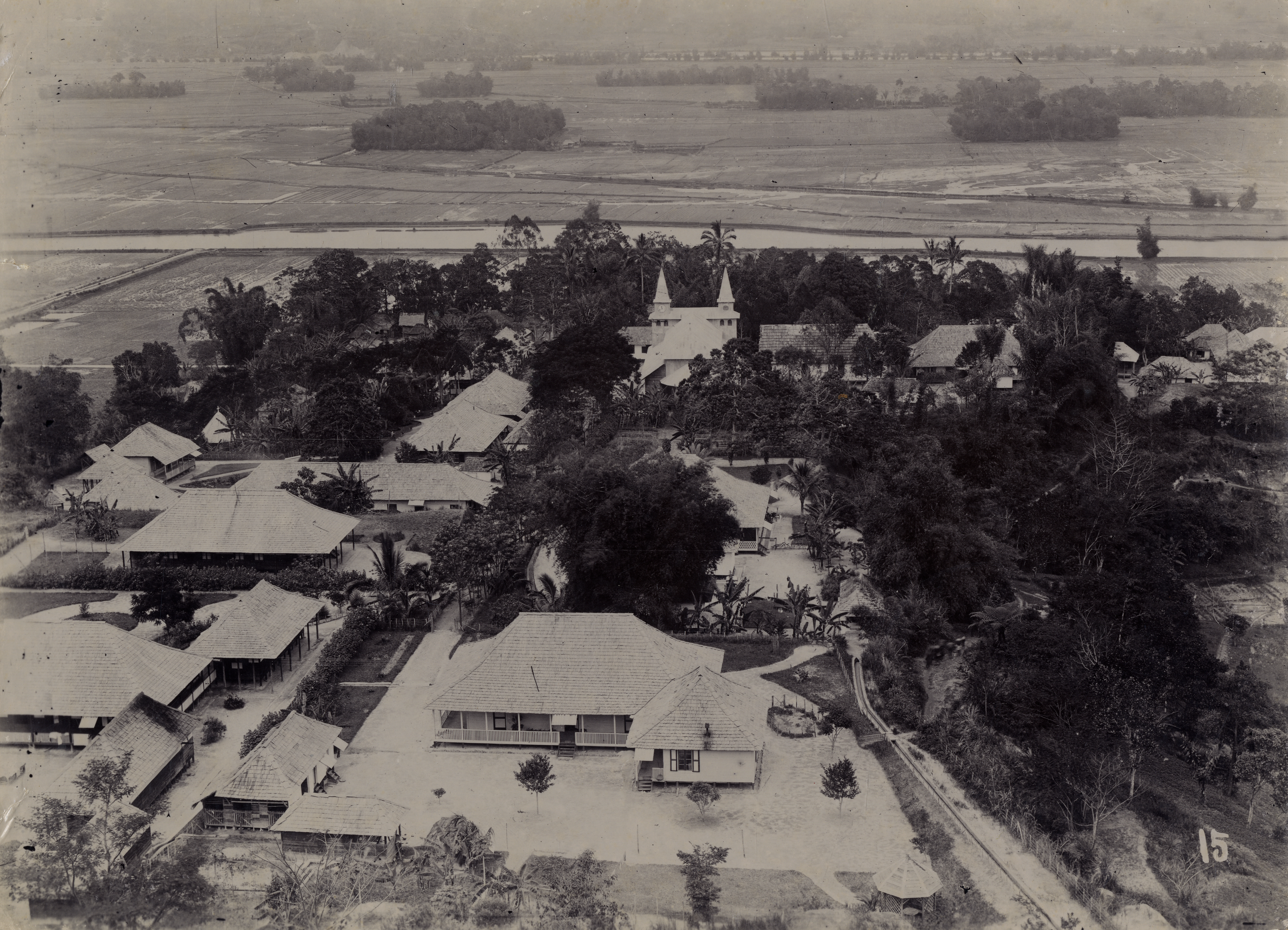
Tarutung circa 1925

After that he left Sumatra for Java, where he studied briefly in an Algemene Middelbare School in Yogyakarta and a Hollandsch Inlandsche Kweekschool (a teacher training school for native students) in Bandung, graduating in 1934. (Many early Indonesian composers received their basic musical training in Kweekschools.) He also received music instruction from a number of musicians during this period, studying piano under Willy van Swers, cello and piano with Joan Giessens in Bandung, and cello with Nicolai Varvolomeyev in Batavia; at this time there were many expatriate European musicians living in Java. He was also exposed to American popular music via musicians from the Philippines who toured regularly in the Indies. He began to make a lot of money working as a piano accompanist and also had some of his early compositions performed by student music groups.

He was also fascinated by languages and later claimed to have learned Russian, Tagalog, Spanish, Japanese, and other languages from working musicians during that era. He then worked as a cellist aboard a Japanese cruise ship for a time, sailing between Japan, Australia and Hawaii, and saving up money to go to music school abroad. In 1936 he had saved enough and left for Tokyo, enrolling in the Musashino Academia Musicae, where he studied piano and cello for three years; he seems to have been the first Indonesian classical musician to study abroad. In the years after he returned to Batavia he also studied composition with the Dutch composer James Zwaart.

=== Music career in Indonesia ===
When he returned from Japan in 1939 Pasaribu joined the Dutch Radio Orchestra in Batavia as a cellist and became an instructor at a Batavia school. At that time non-European classical musicians were quite rare. During the Japanese occupation of the Dutch East Indies which began in 1942, Pasaribu quickly rose to prominence in the music world because he could speak Japanese. He worked in radio broadcasting and played cello in the radio symphony orchestra Oshio Kioku Kangen Goku which was directed by Nobuo Ida and Pasaribu's old teacher Varvolomeyev. During the occupation Western-influenced music except for classical music were discouraged (including Kroncong, Hawaiian music, and Foxtrot); Pasaribu found that the Japanese preferred old Sumatran and Malay songs he played on piano. He also worked in a propaganda office Keimin Bunka Shidoso with fellow composers Cornel Simanjuntak and Binsar Sitompul composing pro-Japanese propaganda songs.

After the Japanese left and Indonesia gained its independence from the Netherlands, he was one of the few highly trained classical musicians remaining in the country, and became director of the music department of Radio Republik Indonesia in Jakarta (which had previously been Radio Batavia). He was hit hard by the death of his friend and musical colleague Cornel Simanjuntak who was shot in 1946 during the Indonesian National Revolution.

During the Revolution and after Indonesian independence, the norms of music teaching and production changed once again, from Dutch before to Japanese and now to Indonesian. Pasaribu became highly involved in music development, research and cultural criticism and the search for a new "national music" for the newly independent country. From 1949 onwards he also played cello in a new fully Indonesian orchestra headed by Varvolomeyev, the Orkes Saraswati. He began to compose prolifically, often creating piano pieces that incorporated Malay music and Gamelan modality. In September 1950 he founded the League of Composers (Liga Komponis), an organization that would protect copyrighted compositions, but relaunched it in December 1950 as the Indonesian Musician's Union (Ikatan Pemusik Indonesia), which at its start had around 80 members. In this era he published a number of Indonesian-language books on music theory and appreciation. He also wrote music criticism prolifically, developing a reputation as someone with a very strong vision and harsh critique of music he found to be lacking or kitschy.

His fortunes changed when he was fired from Radio Republik Indonesia in 1952 after a dispute with the owner. His works were blacklisted by the government, although they were still performed in some contexts. Having lost his ability compose and perform at a national level, he turned to education and curriculum development and worked extensively for the Ministry of Education. He had been advocating since the 1940s for more support for the fine arts and the development of a more rigorous musical education system as it existed in European countries. In August 1953 he became chair of a new organization in Jakarta, the Musjawarat Musik Indonesia (Indonesian Music Society) which aimed at supporting that development. In early 1954 he was also member of a committee which aimed to develop Jakarta as a center of culture; other members included the novelist Pramoedya Ananta Toer, the painter Henk Ngantung, and the poet Asrul Sani.

In 1954 he traveled to Beijing as a Ministry representative to study Chinese music and opera and to do research for the opening of a fine arts institute. Upon his return to Indonesia in the same year, he became director of a Ministry of Education music school (Sekolah Musik Indonesia, SMINDO) in Yogyakarta. Starting in 1955 he also became co-editor, along with HB Jassin, Zaini and Trisno Sumardjo, of a new Jakarta arts and culture magazine called Seni. He also regularly contributed to other literary magazines in the 1950s, including Zénith and Siasat. He continued to travel abroad to do research and build connections for the fine arts institutions. However, he grew increasingly disappointed with the state of Indonesian popular music and what he saw as a lack of authenticity or sophistication.

He then became an instructor of music education in a new Ministry of Education institution in Jakarta which became the Jakarta Institute of Teaching and Education (IKIP Jakarta) in 1965 (now part of the State University of Jakarta). During that time he was associated with LEKRA, the Communist-affiliated cultural organization, and was friends with prominent members such as Sitor Situmorang and Pramoedya Ananta Toer.

=== Time in Surinam ===
In 1968, following the Transition to the New Order and the banning of LEKRA, and possibly for economic reasons, he left Indonesia for Surinam, which at that time was still a part of the Netherlands. After that time his reputation and popularity declined greatly in Indonesia, and he mostly ceased composing. He later said that he had lost faith in the music world in Indonesia and the direction it had been taking. He became a piano and cello teacher at the Suriname Cultural Center and after 1975 became a private piano teacher in Paramaribo as well as a cellist and conductor for the Paramaribo Symphony Orchestra. He also worked as a translator and occasional speechwriter for the Indonesian embassy in Surinam. It was in 1986 that he published his critical work Analisis Musik Indonesia (Analysis of Indonesian music), after having not published any new books since the 1950s.

=== Retirement and return to Indonesia ===
He returned to Indonesia in 1996, settling in Medan, North Sumatra and becoming an importer of Czech pianos.

Amir Pasaribu died at the age of 94 in Medan on 10 February 2010.

== Legacy ==
Although his popularity in Indonesia was diminished after his departure to Surinam and due to his connection with LEKRA, Pasaribu's contribution to the development of a classical and modern music culture in Indonesia is widely recognized. His piano compositions continue to be performed, including by the pianist Ananda Sukarlan. Some of the anthems he composed in the 1950s continued to be used by Indonesian organizations, most notably Andhika Bhayangkari, an anthem that was used by the Indonesian National Armed Forces.

In 2003 a concert hall was named in his honor: the Amir Pasaribu Concert Hall at the music school Sekolah Musik - Yayasan Pendidikan Musik Bintaro in Tangerang.

== Selected publications ==
=== Music compositions ===
==== For solo piano ====
- Olé olé melojo-lojo (February 1949)
- Maswika Lily (July 1949)
- Suling Si Bongkok (Bongkok’s Bamboo-flute, Orpheus in de dessa, September 1949)
- Sonata I (1949-50)
- Sonata II (1949-50)
- 6 Variasi Sriwijaya (1950)
- Indihyang (1951)

==== For violin and piano ====
- Clair de lune (September 1951)

=== Books ===
- Teori Singkat Tulisan Musik (Concise theory of music writing) (NV Noordhof-Kolff, 1952)
- Lagu-lagu Lama Solo Piano I (Old songs for solo piano) (Balai Pustaka 1952)
- Bernjanji Kanon (Singing in canon) (Balai Pustaka, Ministry of Education, 1953)
- Riwayat Musik dan Musisi (The story of music and musicians) (Gunung Agung, 1953)
- Suka Menjanji (Love to sing) (Indira, 1955)
- Musik dan Selingkar wilayahnya, (Music and surrounding areas) (Ministry of Education, 1955)
- Lagu-lagu Lama Solo Piano II (Balai Pustaka, 1958)
- Menudju Apresiasi Musik (Towards appreciation of music) (NV Noordhof-Kolff, 1950s)
- Analisis Musik Indonesia (Analysis of Indonesian music) (PT Pantja Simpati, 1986)
