= Ibu Pertiwi (song) =

Indonesian patriotic song of the 1900s

Song by Kamsidi Samsuddin
- Released: 1908
- Genre: National song
- Songwriter: Kamsidi Samsuddin
- Composer: Charles C. Converse (1868)

Ibu Pertiwi is a popular Indonesian patriotic song composed by Kamsidi Samsuddin in 1908. The song's lyrics are about Ibu Pertiwi, the national personification of Indonesia (also interpreted as "mother country"). It is normally sung by Indonesian children, elementary and secondary school students, or played during Indonesian Independence Day celebrations. In 2016 the Indonesian classical composer, Ananda Sukarlan, made a set of variations for piano based on this song.

== Lyrics ==
The lyrics are as following:

=== Original lyrics ===
(in Indonesian)

First verse:

Kulihat ibu pertiwi sedang bersusah hati
Air matanya berlinang, mas intannya terkenang

Hutan gunung sawah lautan simpanan kekayaan
Kini ibu sedang lara, merintih, dan berdoa

Second verse:

Kulihat ibu pertiwi, kami datang berbakti
Lihatlah putra-putrimu menggembirakan ibu

Ibu kami tetap cinta putramu yang setia
Menjaga harta pusaka untuk nusa dan bangsa

=== Translation ===
First verse:

I see Motherland (Ibu Pertiwi: personification of Indonesia)
(She is) in sorrow
Her tears are flowing
Remembering her (lost) gold and diamonds

Forests, mountains, farms, and the seas
Home of the treasures (richness)
Now Mother is grieving
Sighing sadly and praying

Second verse:

I see Motherland
We come to serve (you)
Behold, your sons and daughters
They will make you happy

Mother, we still love (you)
Your faithful sons
Guarding the heirloom
For our homeland and nation

== Adoption of Christian Hymn music ==
Although the lyrics were originally composed, the music and melody of this adaptation resembled the Christian hymn What a Friend We Have in Jesus, originally written by Joseph M. Scriven as a poem in 1855. The hymn is sung in Indonesian as Yesus Kawan yang Sejati and has been a Christian music since 1975 as well as in Toba Batak as Ise do Alealenta and is popular in Batak churches, as well as in Protestant and Roman Catholic churches. Even though Indonesia has a statistically larger Muslim community, the hymn is quite widely known. Prior his death in 1958, the melody of the music was adopted by Kamsidi Samsuddin, the composer of the Ibu Pertiwi song.

== In popular culture ==
"Ibu Pertiwi" is used as the theme song of 2019 film adaptation of This Earth of Mankind, performed by Iwan Fals, Once and Fiersa Besari.

== See also ==
- Ibu Pertiwi
