= Indonesia Raya =

National anthem of Indonesia

English: Indonesia the Great
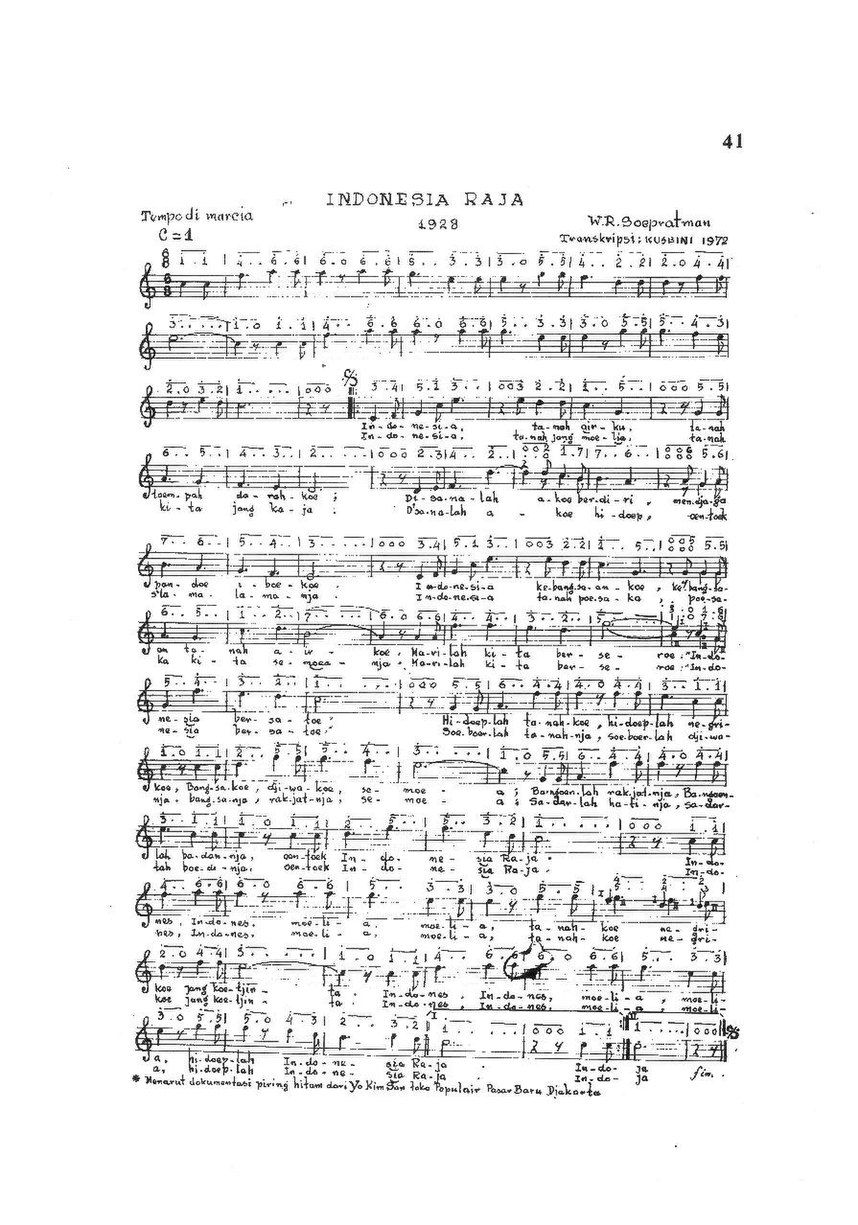
- Music sheet of "Indonesia Raya"
- National anthem of Indonesia
- Also known as: Indonesia Raja (old spelling)
- Lyrics: Wage Rudolf Supratman, 1924; National Anthem Committee (led by Sukarno), 1944
- Music: Wage Rudolf Supratman, 1924
- Adopted: 17 August 1945 (original); 17 August 1950 (official); 7 December 1975 (by East Timor under Indonesia)
- Relinquished: 1999 (by East Timor)

Audio sample
- U.S. Navy Band instrumental rendition in A-flat major: file; help

"Indonesia Raya" ("Great Indonesia") is the national anthem of Indonesia. It has been the national anthem since the Proclamation of Indonesian Independence on 17 August 1945. The song was introduced by its composer, Wage Rudolf Supratman, on 28 October 1928 during the Youth Pledge in Jakarta. The song marked the birth of the archipelago nationalist movement in Indonesia that aims to gain independence from Dutch colonial rule. The first newspaper to openly publish the musical notation and lyrics of "Indonesia Raya" – an act of defiance towards the Dutch authorities – was the Chinese Indonesian weekly Sin Po.

The first stanza of "Indonesia Raya" was chosen as the national anthem when Indonesia proclaimed its independence on 17 August 1945. Jozef Cleber, a Dutch composer, created an arrangement of the tune for philharmonic orchestra on August 17, 1950, when the island of Sumatra became an integral part of the Republic of Indonesia. This arrangement is widely used.

"Indonesia Raya" is played in flag raising ceremonies in schools across Indonesia every Monday. The flag is raised in a solemn and timed motion so that it reaches the top of the flagpole as the anthem ends. The main flag raising ceremony is held annually on 17 August to commemorate Independence day. The ceremony is led by the President of Indonesia and is usually held in Merdeka Palace.

During the rendition or singing of the national anthem, all present should stand, face toward the music, and pay respect. Members of the Armed Forces, and other persons in uniform (e.g. secondary school students) must render the military salute.

== History ==
=== Indonesian Youth Congress ===
When he lived in Jakarta, Soepratman read an essay from Timbul magazine. The essay author challenged Indonesian music experts to compose a future Indonesian national anthem. Soepratman – who was also a musician – felt challenged, and started composing. In 1924, the song was completed during his time in Bandung and entitled "Indonesia".

According to Tempo, the song's lyrics were revised after Soepratman was reportedly inspired by Tan Malaka's book Massa Actie, after its publication in 1926. In particular within the chapter 'Chajal Seorang Revoloesioner', wherein Tan Malaka wrote, "...seorang poetera Toempah darahnja," ("...a son sheds his blood") and "...seorang poetera Tanah Indonesia tempat darahmoe tertoempah." ("...a son of the Indonesian homeland, the land where your blood was spilled"). The song went through several revisions before reaching its finished form in 1928.

In 1928, youths from across Indonesia held the first Indonesian Youth Congress, an official meeting to push for the independence of the nation. Upon hearing about the efforts, young reporter Wage Rudolf Soepratman contacted the organizers of Congress with the intention of reporting the story, but they requested that he not publish the story from fear of Dutch colonial authorities. The organizers wanted to avoid suspicion so that the Dutch would not ban the event. Supratman promised them this, and the organizers allowed him free access to the event. Supratman was inspired by the meetings and intended to play the song for the conference. After receiving encouragement from the conference leader Sugondo Djojopuspito, Soepratman played the song on the violin, hoping that it would someday become their national anthem. Soepratman first performed Indonesia on the violin on 28 October 1928 during the Second Indonesian Youth Congress. He kept the script to himself because he felt that it was not the appropriate time to announce it.

=== Distribution ===
First recording of the "Indonesia Raya"
Performed by WR. Supratman himself (violin) and recorded by Yo Kim Tjan. Batavia, 1927.

Following the Second Youth Congress, the text of Indonesia was distributed by many political and student organisations. The press also played a key role in the publication of the song. On 7 November 1928, the Soeloeh Ra'jat Indonesia daily published the words to the song. This was followed by the Sin Po Chinese weekly on 10 November. In 1929, Wage Rudolf Supratman changed the title of his song to "Indonesia Raya" and appended the phrase "national anthem of Indonesia" below it, but the text of the song did not change. Soepratman personally printed and distributed copies of the song with its new title through pamphlets. All one thousand copies of the manuscript were sold within a short amount of time to his friends and family.

That same year, the prominent Indonesian businessman and record executive Tio Tek Hong contacted Supratman; the two agreed to issue the first records of the anthem, with Supratman retaining copyright over it. The new records were extremely popular, but in 1930 the Dutch colonial authorities placed a ban on the song and confiscated all remaining unsold records.

A businessman friend of his, Yo Kim Tjan, also expressed interest in recording "Indonesia Raya". With Soepratman's consent, Yo created a copy of the song on a gramophone record overseas to obtain the best sound quality with the intention of bringing the copy back to Indonesia. However, before Yo was able to do so, Dutch colonial authorities had imposed a ban on the song. Yo was unable to bring the original back but was able to bring home a copy. According to Yo, Soepratman had also given him the rights to sell record copies of "Indonesia Raya" through his store Toko Populair.

=== Orchestration ===
A Japanese propaganda film emphasising "Indonesia Raya", a song with an equal status that of "Kimigayo" as the de facto national anthem of Indonesia during Japanese occupation, c. 1945.

Initially, there had been no orchestral version of the anthem. Thus in 1950, the Indonesian Government made an appeal to Jozef Cleber to compose a symphonic rendition of "Indonesia Raya".

Cleber at the time had been among the 46 people of the Cosmopolitan Orchestra, under direction of Yvon Baarspul, sent by the Netherlands government to help the Indonesian government for its own music development in Jakarta. "Jos" Cleber was an experienced arranger not only of western songs but also for Indonesian pop songs such as "Di Bawah Sinar Bulan Purnama" and "Rangkaian Melati".

"Indonesia Raya" was recorded under Cleber's direction on a newly acquired Phillips reel-to-reel tape recorder in early 1951 with musicians from all three radio orchestras of Radio Republik Indonesia (RRI) Jakarta and the tape was played for President Sukarno's approval. Sukarno found the performance too frilly and asked for something like the red and white Indonesian flag, and in the grave tempo of the Dutch anthem "Wilhelmus". Cleber considered this last impossible, though he discerned some of the character of the "Marseillaise" in the tune and made a second arrangement marked maestoso con bravura as a compromise. This met Sukarno's approval, but he requested that the climax be prepared by a grazioso ("Liefelijk") section. This final version of the anthem remained in use for 47 years. This was followed in 1998 by a remastered version composed by Addie MS, performed jointly by his Twilite Orchestra, the Victorian Philharmonic Orchestra and the Melbourne Symphony Orchestra, and developed at Allan Eaton Studio in Melbourne, Australia, as part of the album Simfoni Negeriku (My Country's Symphony).

The arrangement starts with a tutti of strings and trumpets (in verse A) that represents a brave and an elegant sound, and in the middle of the song (in verse B) is played smoothly by strings, and finally (in verse C) comes another tutti of strings and trumpets, together with the timpani, snare drums and cymbals.

=== Ownership ===
In 1951, ownership of the copyright to "Indonesia Raya" came into question. President Sukarno ordered a search for the rightful heir to Soepratman. By law, Supratman was the copyright holder of "Indonesia Raya" as its composer. After Soepratman's death in 1938, ownership of the rights to his works fell upon the designated heirs, his four surviving sisters. However, because "Indonesia Raya" was officially adopted as the national anthem of Indonesia on 17 August 1945, the work became the property of the state. In addition, the name of "Wage Rudolf Supratman" must be listed as its creator.

As a national anthem, copies of "Indonesia Raya" cannot be circulated as merchandise to be sold. Consequently, the government had the obligation to obtain all the rights to distribute the song, including the original recording, from Yo Kim Tjan. In 1958, the government obtained the sole right to "Indonesia Raya" from Soepratman's family. The following year, Yo handed the original record of the song to the Indonesian government. With the recommendation of the Department of Education, the government also rewarded Soepratman's sisters with 250,000 Indonesian rupiah each on 31 May 1960.

== Legal basis ==
As stipulated by chapter XV, article 36B of the Constitution of Indonesia, "Indonesia Raya" is the national anthem of Indonesia. Furthermore, pursuant to 1958 State Gazette no. 44, only the first stanza of "Indonesia Raya" is to serve the function of a national anthem.

== Lyrics ==
There is no official translation of "Indonesia Raya" into other languages. On 28 October 1953, on the 25th anniversary of the anthem, the Harian Umum daily published their own English, German, and Dutch translations of the song. A bulletin released by the former Department of Information used these translations. Currently, however, the translations are no longer published.

Official Indonesian text
Indonesia, tanah airku
Tanah tumpah darahku
Di sanalah aku berdiri
Jadi pandu ibuku

Indonesia, kebangsaanku
Bangsa dan tanah airku
Marilah kita berseru
Indonesia bersatu!

Hiduplah tanahku, hiduplah negeriku
Bangsaku, rakyatku, semuanya
Bangunlah jiwanya, bangunlah badannya
Untuk Indonesia Raya
Refrain:
Indonesia Raya, merdeka! Merdeka!
Tanahku, negeriku yang kucinta
Indonesia Raya, merdeka! Merdeka!
Hiduplah Indonesia Raya!

Indonesia, tanah yang mulia
Tanah kita yang kaya
Di sanalah aku berdiri
Untuk selama-lamanya

Indonesia, tanah pusaka
Pusaka kita semuanya
Marilah kita mendoa
"Indonesia bahagia!"

Suburlah tanahnya, suburlah jiwanya
Bangsanya, rakyatnya, semuanya
Sadarlah hatinya, sadarlah budinya
Untuk Indonesia Raya
Refrain

Indonesia, tanah yang suci
Tanah kita yang sakti
Di sanalah aku berdiri
Menjaga ibu sejati

Indonesia, tanah berseri
Tanah yang aku sayangi
Marilah kita berjanji
"Indonesia abadi!"

Selamatlah rakyatnya, selamatlah putranya
Pulaunya, lautnya, semuanya
Majulah negerinya, majulah pandunya
Untuk Indonesia Raya
Refrain

Van Ophuijsen orthography
Indonesia, tanah aïrkoe
Tanah toempah darahkoe
Di sanalah akoe berdiri
Djadi pandoe iboekoe

Indonesia, kebangsaänkoe
Bangsa dan tanah aïrkoe
Marilah kita berseroe
Indonesia bersatoe!

Hidoeplah tanahkoe, hidoeplah negrikoe
Bangsakoe, ra'jatkoe, sem'wanja
Bangoenlah djiwanja, bangoenlah badannja
Oentoek Indonesia Raja
Refrain:
Indonesia Raja, merdeka! merdeka!
Tanahkoe, negrikoe jang koetjinta
Indonesia Raja, merdeka! merdeka!
Hidoeplah Indonesia Raja!

Indonesia, tanah jang moelia
Tanah kita jang kaja
Di sanalah akoe berdiri
Oentoek slama-lamanja

Indonesia, tanah poesaka
P'saka kita sem'wanja
Marilah kita mendo'a
Indonesia bahagia!

Soeboerlah tanahnja, soeboerlah djiwanja
Bangsanja, ra'jatnja, sem'wanja
Sadarlah hatinja, sadarlah boedinja
Oentoek Indonesia Raja
Refrain:

Indonesia, tanah jang soetji
Tanah kita jang sakti
Di sanalah akoe berdiri
'Ndjaga iboe sedjati

Indonesia, tanah berseri
Tanah jang akoe sajangi
Marilah kita berdjandji
Indonesia abadi!

S'lamatlah ra'jatnja, s'lamatlah poetranja
Poelaunja, laoetnja, sem'wanja
Madjoelah neg'rinja, madjoelah pandoenja
Oentoek Indonesia Raja
Refrain:

English translation
Indonesia, my homeland
The land where I shed my blood
Right there, I stand
To be a guide of my motherland.

Indonesia, my nationality
My nation and my homeland
Let us exclaim
Indonesia unites.

Long live my land, long live my state
My nation, my people, entirely
Let us build its soul, let us build its body
For the Great Indonesia.
Chorus:
Great Indonesia, independent and sovereign,
My land, my country which I love
Great Indonesia, independent and sovereign!
Long live Great Indonesia!

Indonesia, a noble land
Our wealthy land
Right there, I stand
Forever and ever.

Indonesia, a hereditary land
A heritage of ours
Let us pray
To Indonesians' happiness.

Fertile may its soil, flourish may its soul
Its nation, its people, entirely,
Aware may its heart, aware may its mind,
For Great Indonesia.
Chorus

Indonesia, a sacred land,
Our victorious land,
Right there, I stand,
To guard the pure motherland.

Indonesia, a radiant land,
A land which I adore,
Let us pledge,
Indonesia is eternal,

Safe may its people, safe may its children,
Its islands, its seas, entirely,
The state progresses, its scouts advance,
For Great Indonesia.
Chorus

== See also ==
- "Bangun Pemudi-Pemuda"
