= Koesbini =

Indonesian composer and musician (1910–1991)

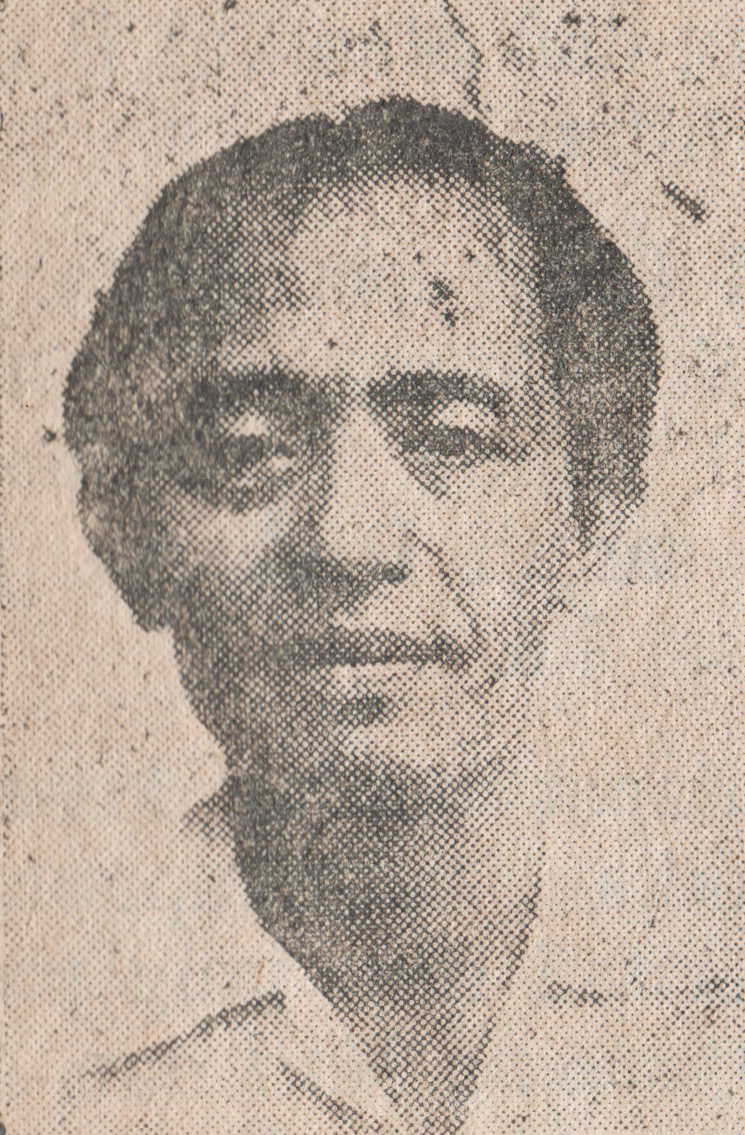
- Koesbini in 1965
- Born: 1 January 1910; Mojokerto, Dutch East Indies
- Died: 28 February 1991 (aged 81); Yogyakarta, Indonesia
- Occupation: Composer
- Years active: 1935–1970
- Notable work: "Bagimu Negeri"

Koesbini (Perfected Spelling: Kusbini; 1 January 1910 – 28 February 1991) was an Indonesian composer and musician. Born the son of a forest ranger in Mojokerto, he became interested in music at a young age and became a member of a Surabaya-based orchestra. By the 1930s he was composing his own kroncong songs and playing the violin and singing on radio broadcasts, gaining enough popularity to be contracted to Majestic Films in 1941 and score two films. During the Japanese occupation of the Dutch East Indies, he composed the song "Bagimu Negeri", later considered his most significant work. During the Indonesian National Revolution, Koesbini supported the republican government, and after the revolution concluded he operated his own music school while working for the Ministry of Teaching, Education, and Culture and continuing to write new songs.

From a young age Koesbini wrote a mixture of nationalist and popular songs, generally in the kroncong style. In his collaborations he would allow others, such as the authors Armijn Pane and Achdiat K. Mihardja, to serve as lyricists. He wrote original songs for two films, Djantoeng Hati and Air Mata Iboe (both 1941), as well as several stage plays.

== Early life ==
Koesbini was born in Kemlagi, a village in Mojokerto, eastern Java, Dutch East Indies, on 1 January 1910, a Legi Friday. He was the third son born to Koesnio, a forest ranger, and Moesinah. He considered his childhood as the son of a ranger, constantly moving about, to have helped him develop nationalistic leanings. Koesbini began his formal schooling at a Hollandsch-Inlandsche School (Note: An elementary school for indigenous Indonesians.) in Jombang. He went on to study at a MULO in Surabaya; he continued his education at the S. de Senerpont Domis trade school.

== Musical career ==
=== Colonial period ===
As a child, Koesbini enjoyed music, learning on his own. In Surabaya he joined the Jong Indisch Stryk-en Tokkel Orchestra under his brother, Koesbandi. In 1927 he left to attend a music course at the Apollo Music School in Malang, staying there until 1930. Between 1935 and 1939 he was a violin player and singer for the NIROM and CIRVO broadcasts in Surabaya, and was soon contracted by the Hoo Soen Hoo gramophone company to produce records.

Koesbini soon began writing, arranging, and orchestrating kroncong songs; these included songs with nationalist themes such as "Kewadjiban Manoesia", "Tjinta Tanah Air", and "Merdeka", as well as more popular tunes such as "Krontjong Poerbakala", "Bintang Sendjakala", and "Kerontjong Sarinande". He also wrote tunes to lyrics by other authors, such as "Padi Mengoening" (lyrics by Armijn Pane), "Rontje Melati" (lyrics by Achdiat K. Mihardja), and "Lagu Kasihku" (lyrics by Kirdjomuljo). In his Ensiklopedi Musik Indonesia, Remy Sylado noted that Koesbini would often perform kroncong adaptations of popular Western songs such as Ballard MacDonald and Harry Carroll's "The Trail of the Lonesome Pine" and Enrico Toselli's "Serenata", giving them Malay-language names.

In 1941 Koesbini was contracted by Fred Young's Majestic Film Company as a music director; his troupe, the Krontjong Syncopaters, joined as well. For the company's first production, Djantoeng Hati, he wrote seven kroncong songs to be sung by the main cast; for the title song, "Djantoeng Hati", he led a 60-strong orchestra. Majestic's second and final film, Air Mata Iboe, featured eleven kroncong songs, many by Koesbini; the music director also took on the role of Bakar, a man too poor to support his mother-in-law (Fifi Young) after she is driven from her home. Though the company was based in Malang, much of its shooting was conducted in the colonial capital of Batavia; Koesbini soon moved there.

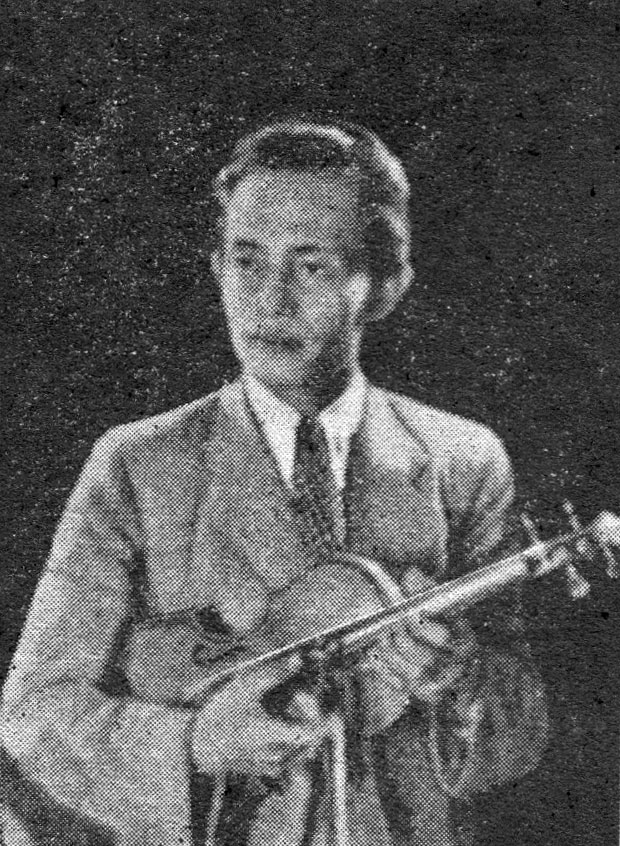
Koesbini in 1943

After the Japanese occupation of the Dutch East Indies began in 1942, Koesbini worked for the Japanese-run Cultural Centre. (Note: In Indonesian, Poesat Keboedajaan; in Japanese, Keimin Bunka Shidōsho (啓民文化指導所)) He soon migrated to the People's Labour Center (Note: Original: Poesat Tenaga Rakjat) (Poetera) in Cikini, Batavia. In 1942 he composed the song "Bagimu Negeri", singing to the nationalist leader Sukarno an early version of the song, which used the term Indonesia raya ('Greater Indonesia') in the final line. Though Sukarno approved of the song's nationalist sentiments, he demanded that the final line be changed; Indonesia raya was thus replaced by jiwa raga kami ('our bodies and souls'). According to Hari Budiono, this change allowed Koesbini to escape censorship during the occupation, as the song had no explicit mention of Indonesia; indeed, "Bagimu Negeri" was first broadcast on a Japanese-run radio station, sung by Ibu Sud.

=== Independent Indonesia ===
Towards the end of the occupation, Koesbini provided music for several pro-nationalist stage plays, including Lukisan Zaman (Portrait of the Times, by Armijn Pane). During the Indonesian National Revolution (1945–1949), he was a member of the Committee for the National Anthem "Indonesia Raya" in Yogyakarta. (Note: Other members included Ki Hadjar Dewantara, Muhammad Yamin, Cornel Simanjuntak, Ibu Sud, and Sanusi Pane (Kamadjaja 1965, p. 27).) When his work with this committee concluded in 1949, he decided to stay in the city.

Koesbini was taken on as an employee of the Ministry of Teaching, Education, and Culture, heading the music office of the Yogyakarta branch of the ministry. He continued to write songs with a number of musicians, including Himodigdojo, D. Suradji, and Sri Murtono; many, such as his "Hymne The New Emerging Forces" ("Hymn of the New Emerging Forces") and "Nasakom Bersatu" ("Nasakom Unite", lyrics by Subronto), contained nationalist themes. He also compiled song lyrics and information on the history of Indonesian music and operated a music school, the Sanggar Olah Seni Indonesia, which he established in 1951.

== Later life ==
By 1965, "Bagimu Negeri" was considered compulsory for Indonesian elementary school students; it is still considered Koesbini's most enduring song. Koesbini was awarded the Arts and Culture Award from the Indonesian government in 1972, followed by an award for by the commander of National Defense Area II (Pangkowilhan II) in 1976. On 27 May 1987 the state television network TVRI broadcast a biographical documentary on him as part of a series on Indonesian cultural figures.

By 1990, Koesbini and his wife Ngadiyan had had eleven children. After Koesbini's death on 28 February 1991, he was buried in a simple ceremony to the sound of "Perdamaian", one of his compositions. The road in front of his home was renamed Koesbini Street by the Yogyakarta Municipal Government. As of 2009, the Sanggar Olah Seni Indonesia is still maintained by Koesbini's children.

== Works cited ==
- "Air Mata Iboe". Pertjatoeran Doenia Dan Film (in Indonesian). 1 (7). Batavia: 29–32. December 1941.
- Budiono, Hari (1990). "Sebuah Harapan Si Buaya Kroncong" [A Hope for the Crocodile of Kroncong]. In Ashadi Siregar (ed.). 33 Profil Budayawan Indonesia [33 Profiles of Indonesian Cultural Figures]. Jakarta: Directorate of Television. pp. 55–59. OCLC 23142568.
- "Djantoeng Hati". filmindonesia.or.id (in Indonesian). Jakarta: Konfidan Foundation. Archived from the original on 2 December 2013.
- Kamadjaja (1965). "Kusbini: Ahli dan Pedjuang Musik jang Konsekwen" [Kusbini: A Consequential Musical Expert and Revolutionary]. 16 Lagu Wadjib [16 Compulsory Songs]. Jakarta: U.P. Indonesia. pp. 25–28. OCLC 10285725.
- Puspa Swara Team (2007). Kumpulan Lagu Nasional: Persembahan untuk Indonesiaku [Collection of National Songs: An Offering to My Indonesia]. Depok: Puspa Swara. ISBN 978-979-1133-71-5.
- Simanjuntak, Hamonangan, ed. (2009). 100 Tokoh yang Mengubah Indonesia [100 Figures who Changed Indonesia]. Yogyakarta: Narasi. ISBN 978-979-16815-3-7.
