= Djantoeng Hati =

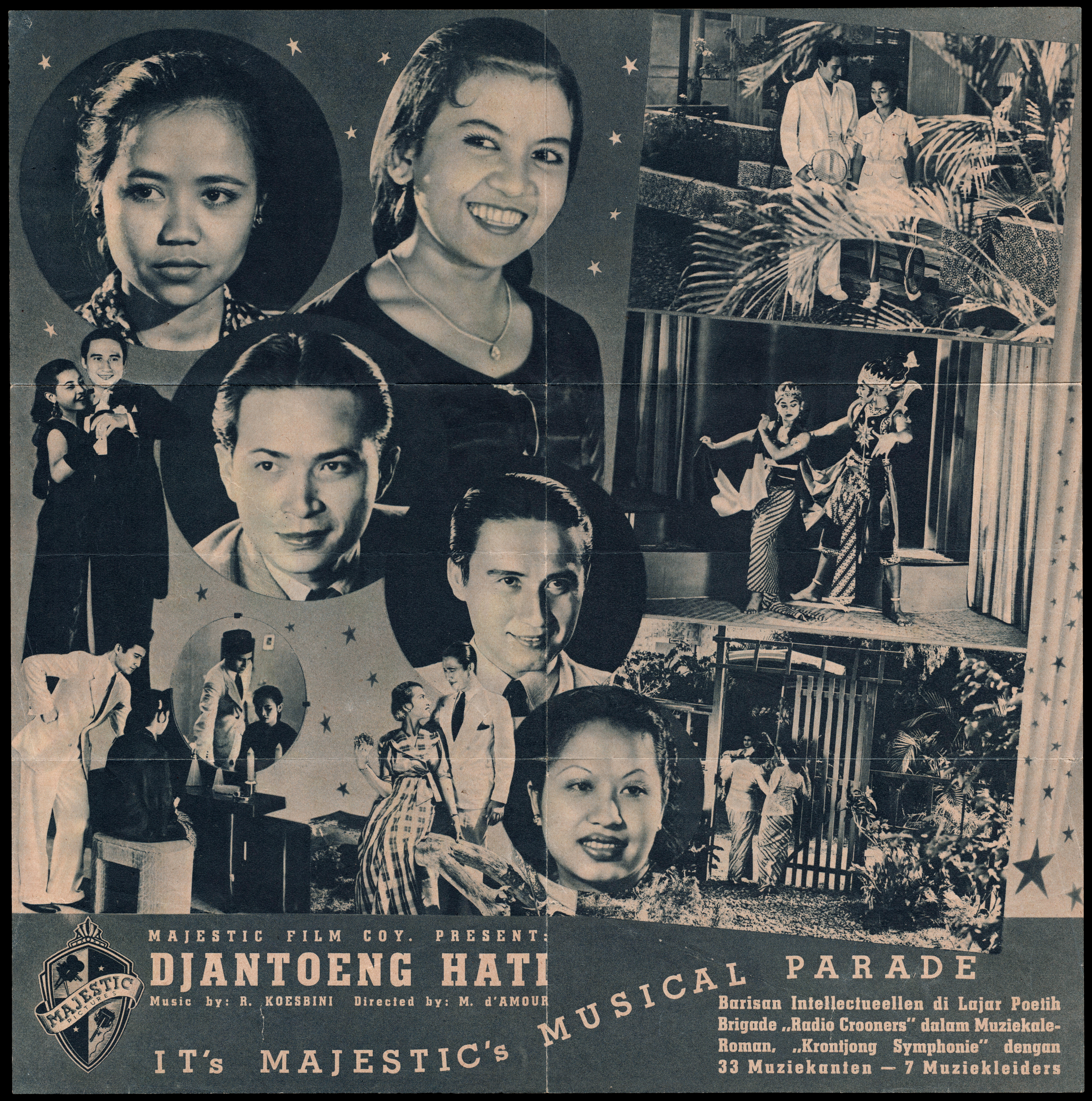
- Handbill
- Directed by: Njoo Cheong Seng
- Written by: Njoo Cheong Seng
- Produced by: Fred Young; SI Liem
- Starring: Rr Anggraini; Ariati; Chatir Harro
- Cinematography: The Teng Chun
- Music by: R. Koesbini
- Production company: Majestic Pictures
- Release date: 1941 (Dutch East Indies)
- Country: Dutch East Indies
- Language: Malay

Djantoeng Hati (Heart and Soul) is a 1941 film from the Dutch East Indies directed by Njoo Cheong Seng. A tragedy warning against modernity, it starred A. Sarosa, Rr Anggraini, and Ariati

== Plot ==
Two students – the traditional Karina (Rr Anggraini) and metropolitan Roesdjana (Ariati) – are in competition for Karina's husband Sobari (Chatir Harro). Eventually Karina wins out.

== Production ==
Djantoeng Hati was written and directed by Njoo Cheong Seng. The film was produced by Fred Young and SI Liem of Majestic Film. It was the company's first production. It starred A. Sarosa, Rr Anggraini, Soerip, and Ariati; Njoo's wife Fifi Young, who had previously acted in all his films, was unable to act owing to health reasons. Most of its stars were of noble (ningrat) descent, an attempt to draw middle-class audiences, while the story focused on students to draw educated viewers.

The black-and-white film was shot by The Teng Chun, one of Fred Young's friends from when he studied in the United States; The also allowed Majestic to use his studios in Batavia (modern-day Jakarta). The's brother Teng Liong served as sound director. The film featured seven kroncong songs by R. Koesbini which were sung by the main cast.

== Release and reception ==
Djantoeng Hati was released in 1941. Majestic's second film, Air Mata Iboe (Mother's Tears) was released later in 1941. It was their last production before the Japanese occupation the following year.

Djantoeng Hati is likely a lost film. The American visual anthropologist Karl G. Heider writes that all Indonesian films from before 1950 are lost. However, JB Kristanto's Katalog Film Indonesia (Indonesian Film Catalogue) records several as having survived at Sinematek Indonesia's archives, and Biran writes that several Japanese propaganda films have survived at the Netherlands Government Information Service.
