= Hollandsch Chineesche School =

Colonial era school in Dutch Indonesia

Coordinates: 6.8187°S 107.1409°E

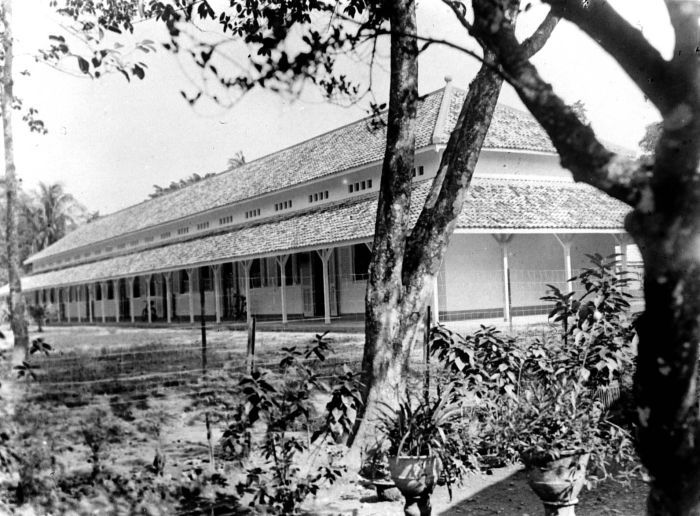
A Hollandsch Chineesche School in Madiun, East Java

Hollandsch-Chineesche School (HCS) (lit. 'Dutch Chinese School') were schools established by the Dutch colonial government in Indonesia for children of Chinese descent. These schools were first established in Jakarta in 1908, mainly to compete with the Chinese language schools founded by Tiong Hoa Hwee Koan in 1901 and which attracted a lot of interest.

As a comparison, in 1915, Chinese-language schools had 16,499 students, while Dutch-language schools had only 8,060 students.

The school uses Dutch as the language of instruction.

== See also ==
- Hogere Burger School (HBS)
- Hollandsch-Inlandsche School (HIS)
- Hollandsch Inlandsche Kweekschool (HIK)
- Hollandsch Javaansche School (HJS)
- Meer Uitgebreid Lager Onderwijs (MULO)
