= Tambunan (surname) =

Tambunan is one of Toba Batak clans originating in North Sumatra, Indonesia. People of this clan bear the clan's name as their surname. Notable people of this clan include:

- Albert Mangaratua Tambunan (1910–1970), Indonesian politician
- Albertus Maruli Tambunan (1925–2019), Indonesian armed forces officer and politician
- Ashari Tambunan (born 1956), Indonesian politician
- Bahal Tambunan (born 1974), Indonesian geologist
- Djamaluddin Tambunan (1922–2001), Indonesian bureaucrat and politician
- Edward Wellington Pahala Tambunan (1928–2006), Indonesian military figure and politician
- RO Tambunan (1935–2015), Indonesian lawyer and politician
