= Air Mata Iboe =

1941 film by Njoo Cheong Seng

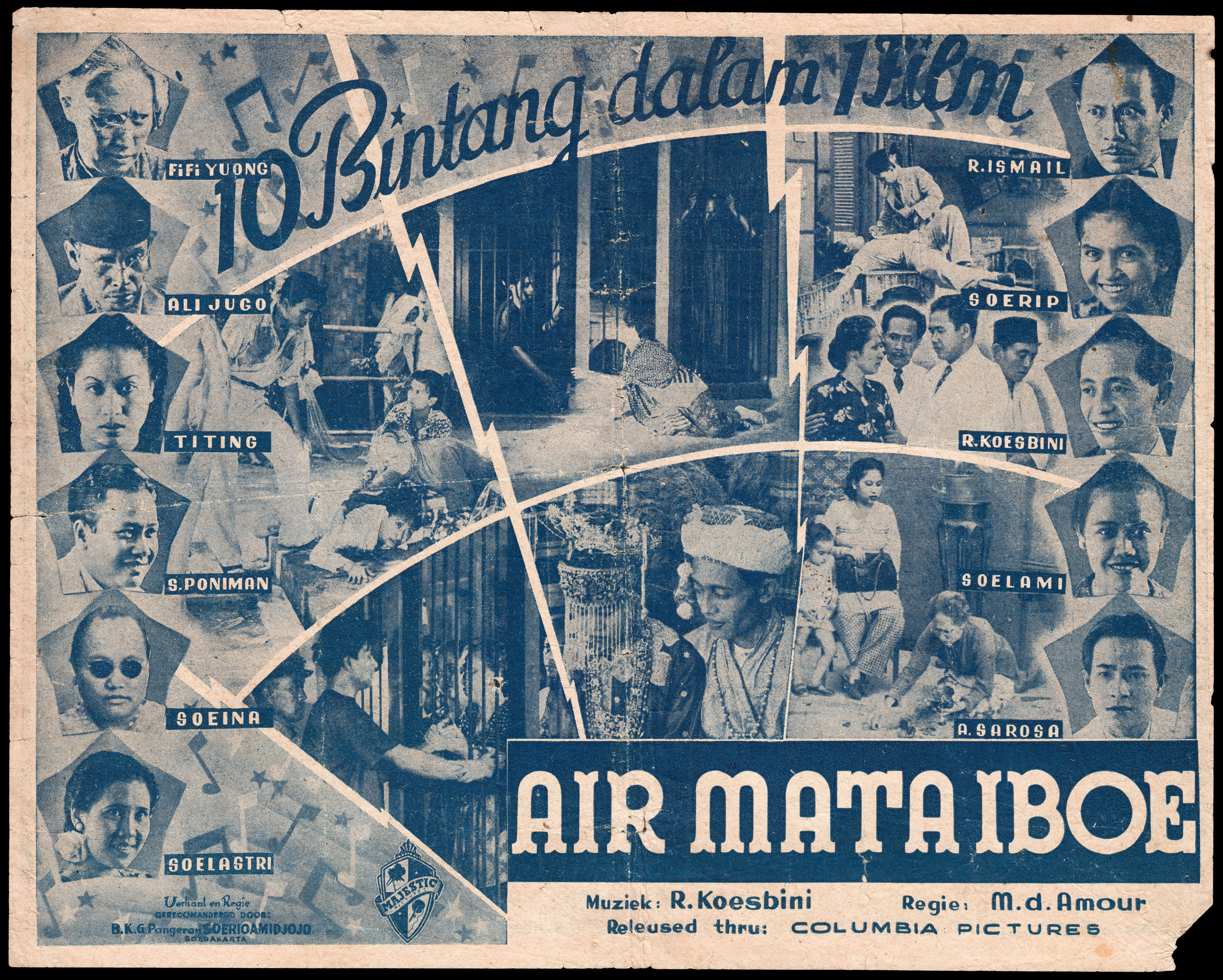
- Film flyer
- Directed by: Njoo Cheong Seng
- Screenplay by: Njoo Cheong Seng
- Produced by: Fred Young
- Starring: Fifi Young; Rd Ismail; Ali Sarosa; Ali Joego
- Music by: R. Koesbini
- Production company: Majestic Film Company
- Release date: 24 December 1941 (Dutch East Indies)
- Country: Dutch East Indies
- Language: Indonesian

Air Mata Iboe (Perfected spelling: Air Mata Ibu; Malay for A Mother's Tears) is a 1941 film from the Dutch East Indies (now Indonesia) directed and written by Njoo Cheong Seng. Starring Fifi Young, Rd Ismail, Ali Sarosa, and Ali Joego, it followed a mother who raises her children lovingly but is ultimately betrayed by her eldest sons when she falls upon hard times. The film, billed as a musical extravaganza, featured a soundtrack by R Koesbini, and an eponymous title song written by Njoo.

The last production completed by Fred Young's Majestic Film Company, Air Mata Iboe was released in December 1941, shortly before the Japanese occupation of the Dutch East Indies. This film, now possibly lost, received positive reviews. A remake was produced under the same title in 1957; Young reprised her role.

== Plot ==
Soegiati is the mother of four children: sons Achmad, Idris, and Soemadi, and a daughter named Soepinah. She loves them all, but Soemadi receives the most of her attention because he receives little from his father, the merchant Soebagio. As the children grow, they marry and move away, and eventually only Soemadi is left. Although he begins a relationship with a young woman named Noormala, he does not marry her as his income is not enough to support them.

On the night of Eid al-Fitr, the family gathers for the holiday. Unbeknownst to the family, Soebagio is leading a double life as a robber, and that evening the police come to arrest him. To protect his father, Soemadi declares himself the culprit, and he is exiled. Feeling guilty for his sins, Soebagio falls ill and dies soon afterwards. Because of their debts, their home and belongings are repossessed, leaving Soegiati to fend for herself.

Though wealthy, Achmad and Idris refuse to take Soegiati in, fearing their respective wives Moedjenah and Mariam. Soepinah and her husband Bakar are willing to take her in, but they live in poverty. Unwilling to burden them, ultimately Soegiati decides to leave and find her own way, depending on the kindness of strangers. Years pass, and Soemadi returns from exile. Encountering his mother, who now lives in poverty, he decides to take revenge on his brothers. (Note: Summary derived from Pertjatoeran Doenia 1941, Air Mata Iboe, p. 30.)

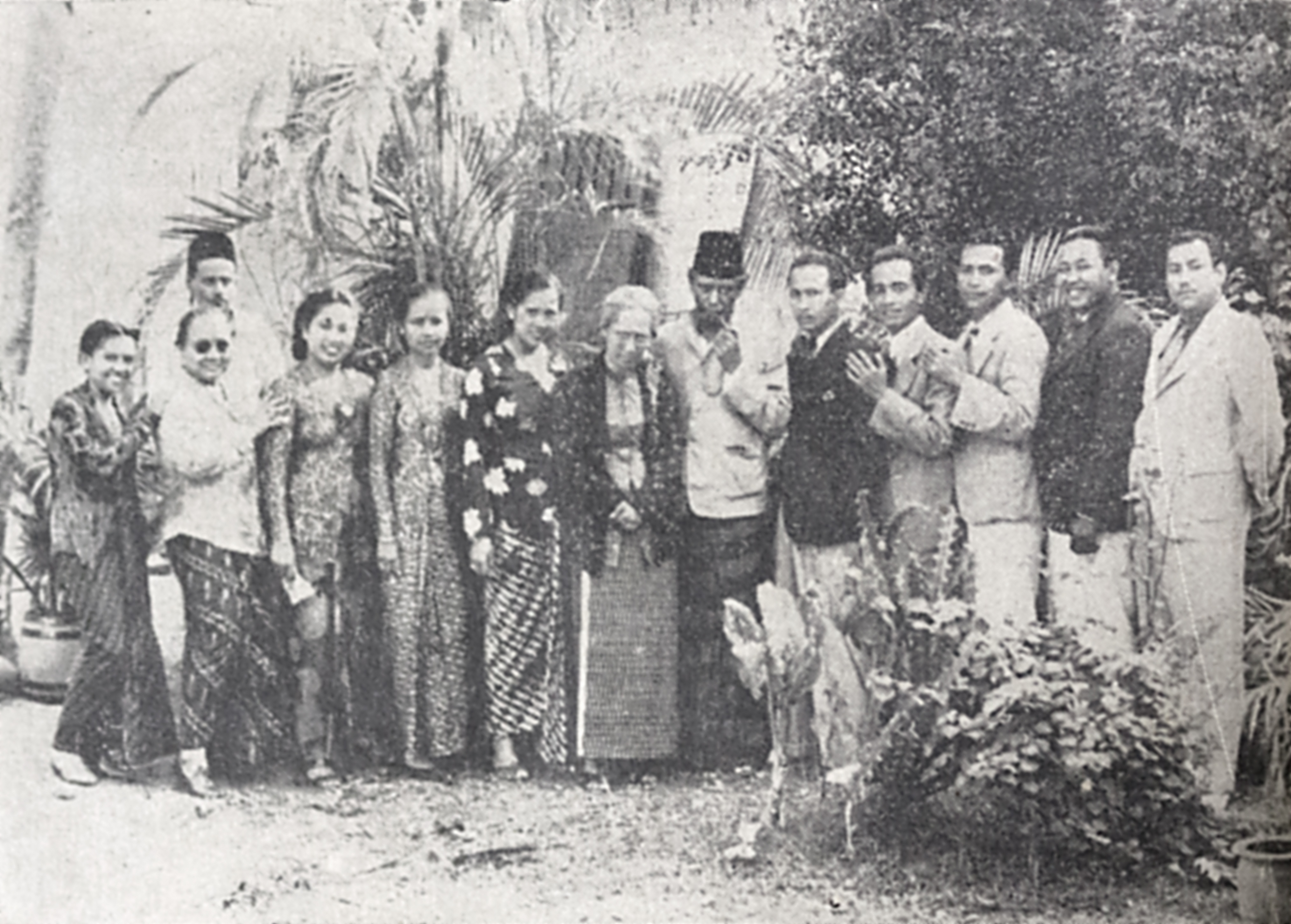
The cast of Air Mata Iboe

== Production ==
The Malang-based Majestic Film Company announced Air Mata Iboe in June 1941 together with two other films, Boedi Terbenam (Hidden Wisdom) and Bachtera Karam (Wrecked Ark). (Note: Biran (2009, pp. 379–386) does not record the latter two titles in his list of films of the Dutch East Indies.) Production began soon afterwards and, by early December 1941, over 55 reels had been shot, as well as 60 sound reels.

Air Mata Iboe was written and directed by Njoo Cheong Seng under his penname M. d'Amour; he had previously directed Djantoeng Hati (Heart and Soul; 1941), which also had a tragic ending, for the company. The film was produced by the company's owner, Fred Young. It starred Njoo's wife Fifi Young (no relation to Fred), Rd Ismail, Ali Sarosa, and Ali Joego. Other roles were held by established singers of keroncong (traditional music with Portuguese influences), including Soerip, Titing, Soelami, Ning Nong, and Poniman. The film, which used make-up to make Fifi Young age into an old woman over the course of its plot, was the actress' first for Majestic; she had been ill during the production of her husband's debut for the company.

The black-and-white film featured eleven keroncong songs written by music director R. Koesbini, who also had a role in the film. Backing music was provided by Koesbini's troupe, the Krontjong Syncopaters, while songs were performed by the cast. (Note: Soerip provided vocals for three songs: "Sepasang Merpati" ("A Pair of Doves"), "Doelit-Doedit", and "Gandengan Tangan" ("Holding Hands"). Soelami performed four songs: "Boelan Bersenjoem" ("The Moon Smiles"), "Melajang Semarang 1921" ("Sailing to Semarang, 1921"), "Stamboel II Oh Iboe" ("Stambul II: Oh, Mother"), and "Krontjong Speciaal" ("Special Kroncong"). Titing provided two songs: "Krontjong Boelan Tertawa" ("Kroncong of the Laughing Moon") and "Padi-Padi" ("Rice"). Ning Nong sang a single song, "Gandengan Tangan" ("Holding Hands"), as did Poniman ("Selamat Hari Raya"; "Happy Holiday"). (Pertjatoeran Doenia 1941, Air Mata Iboe, p. 29).) Notes and lyrics for the film's title song, "Air Mata Iboe", were published in the December 1941 edition of Pertjatoeran Doenia dan Film. (Note: Covers of this song continued to be performed into the 2000s (see, for instance, Subardja HS's 2014 cover (Liner notes for Lagu Keroncong Tempo Doeloe Vol 4)).)

== Release and legacy ==
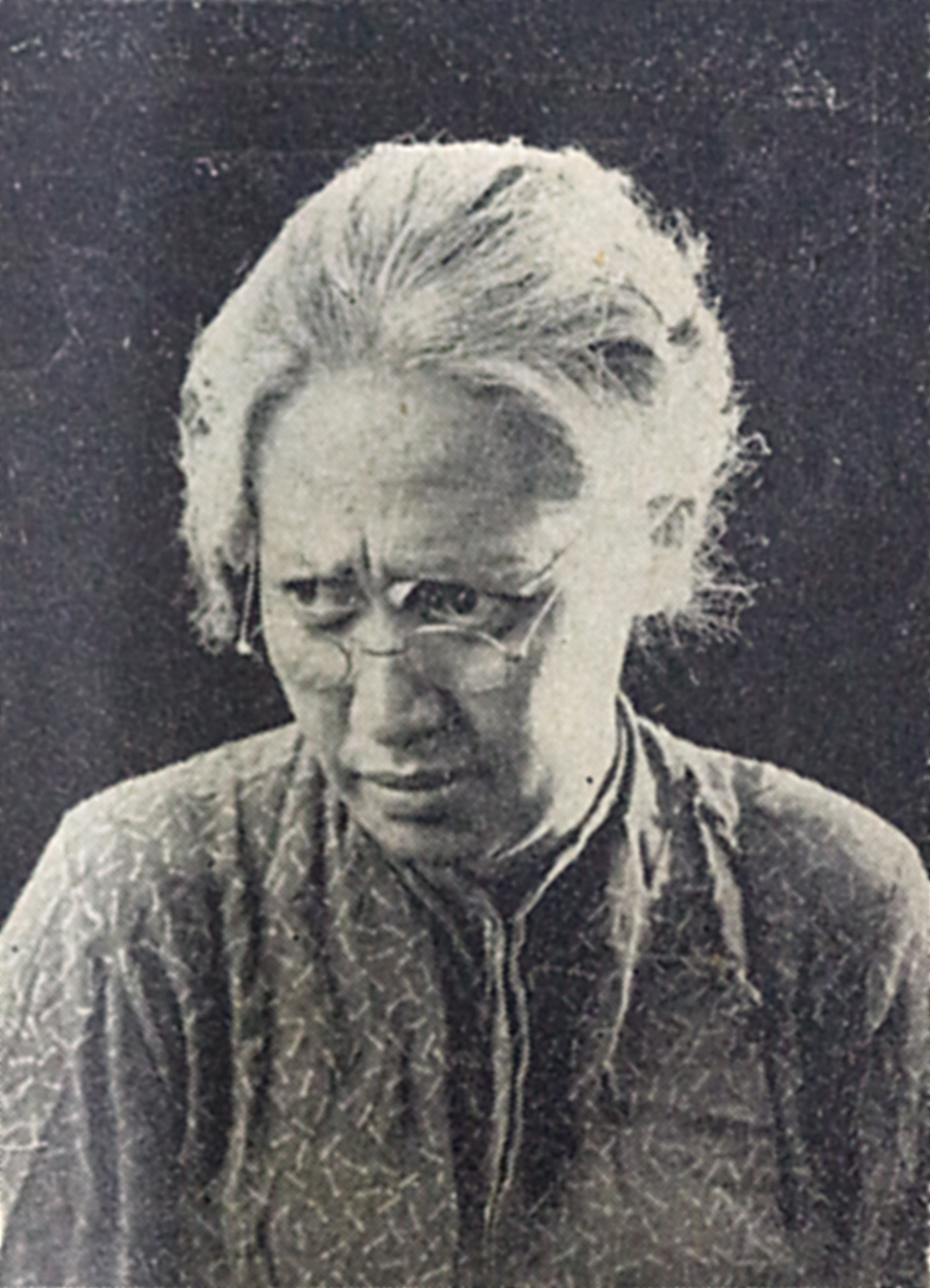
Fifi Young, made up as an old woman for the film; she retook the role of Soegiati in the 1957 remake.

Air Mata Iboe, which was rated for all ages, was distributed by Columbia Pictures and premiered at Sampoerna Theatre in Surabaya on 24 December 1941. Also advertised under the Dutch title Tranen Eener Moeder (a literal translation from Malay), the film was promoted as a "musical extravaganza"; (Note: Original: "muzikale extravaganza") other advertisements emphasised the size of the cast. An anonymous review in the Soerabaijasch Handelsblad noted the extensive use of keroncong and praised the acting and singing, suggesting that native audiences would flock to see the film.

Air Mata Iboe was the last film produced by Majestic Film Company, which closed following the Japanese occupation. (Note: Though the director Tan Tjoei Hock later testified that Air Mata Iboe was incomplete when the Japanese occupation began, thus leading him to finish it on his own (Biran 2009, pp. 240–241), the existence of contemporary coverage belies that.) During the occupation Njoo, Fifi Young, and Fred Young established their own travelling theatrical troupe, Pantjawarna, though all returned to cinema in the 1950s. Joego likewise returned to film after spending the occupation in theater. Poniman, Sarosa, Ismail, and Soerip all returned to cinema, the men in the 1950s and Soerip in 1973. Soelami is not recorded as acting in any further productions.

A remake of Air Mata Iboe was produced in 1957, after Indonesia had obtained its independence. Directed by Fred Young, the film had Fifi Young retake her role as Sugiati, while Rd Ismail took the role of Subagio. The remake's other cast members had not appeared in the original film. The sons Achmad, Idris, and Soemadi were portrayed by Sukarno M. Noor, Boes Boestami, and Kamsul, respectively. The couple's daughter, renamed Atikah, was played by Farida Arriany.

Air Mata Iboe is likely lost. Movies in the Indies were recorded on highly flammable nitrate film, and after a fire destroyed much of Produksi Film Negara's warehouse in 1952, old films shot on nitrate were deliberately destroyed. Thus, the American visual anthropologist Karl G. Heider wrote that all Indonesian films from before 1950 are lost. However, JB Kristanto's Katalog Film Indonesia (Indonesian Film Catalogue) records several as having survived at Sinematek Indonesia's archives, and Biran writes that several Japanese propaganda films have survived at the Netherlands Government Information Service.

== Works cited ==
- "Air Mata Iboe". filmindonesia.or.id (in Indonesian). Jakarta: Konfiden Foundation. Archived from the original on 2 December 2013.
- "Air Mata Iboe". Pertjatoeran Doenia Dan Film (in Indonesian). 1 (7). Batavia: 29–32. December 1941.
- "Air Mata Ibu". filmindonesia.or.id (in Indonesian). Jakarta: Konfiden Foundation. Archived from the original on 9 August 2014.
- "Ali Sarosa". filmindonesia.or.id (in Indonesian). Jakarta: Konfiden Foundation. Archived from the original on 2 April 2015.
- Biran, Misbach Yusa, ed. (1979). Apa Siapa Orang Film Indonesia 1926–1978 [What and Who: Film Figures in Indonesia, 1926–1978]. Sinematek Indonesia. OCLC 6655859.
- Biran, Misbach Yusa (2009). Sejarah Film 1900–1950: Bikin Film di Jawa [History of Film 1900–1950: Making Films in Java] (in Indonesian). Jakarta: Komunitas Bamboo working with the Jakarta Art Council. ISBN 978-979-3731-58-2.
- Biran, Misbach Yusa (2012). "Film di Masa Kolonial" [Film in the Colonial Period]. Indonesia dalam Arus Sejarah: Masa Pergerakan Kebangsaan [Indonesia in the Flow of Time: The Nationalist Movement] (in Indonesian). Vol. V. Jakarta: Ministry of Education and Culture. pp. 268–93. ISBN 978-979-9226-97-6.
- "Fifi Young" (in Indonesian). Taman Ismail Marzuki. Archived from the original on 1 January 2014.
- "Fred Young". filmindonesia.or.id (in Indonesian). Jakarta: Konfiden Foundation. Archived from the original on 20 February 2015.
- Heider, Karl G (1991). Indonesian Cinema: National Culture on Screen. Honolulu: University of Hawaii Press. ISBN 978-0-8248-1367-3.
- "Kredit Air Mata Iboe". filmindonesia.or.id (in Indonesian). Jakarta: Konfiden Foundation. Archived from the original on 7 March 2016.
- Lagu Keroncong Tempo Doeloe Vol 4 (Media notes). Cakrawala Music Nusantara. 2007.
- "Majestic Film Coy. Aanvang werkzaamheden" [Majestic Film Coy. Starting work]. Soerabaijasch Handelsblad (in Dutch). Surabaya: Kolff & Co. 14 June 1941. p. 12. Archived from the original on 17 July 2021.
- "Njoo Cheong Seng". filmindonesia.or.id (in Indonesian). Jakarta: National Library of Indonesia with Sinematek. Archived from the original on 20 February 2015.
- "Raden Ismail Djajadiningrat". filmindonesia.or.id (in Indonesian). Jakarta: Konfiden Foundation. Archived from the original on 2 April 2015.
- "S Poniman". filmindonesia.or.id (in Indonesian). Jakarta: Konfiden Foundation. Archived from the original on 6 March 2014.
- "Sampoerna theater "Air Mata Iboe"". De Indische courant (in Dutch). Surabaya: Kolff & Co. 27 December 1941. p. 7. Archived from the original on 17 July 2021.
- "Soelami". filmindonesia.or.id (in Indonesian). Jakarta: Konfiden Foundation. Archived from the original on 7 April 2015.
- "(untitled)". Soerabaijasch Handelsblad (in Dutch). Surabaya: Kolff & Co. 24 December 1941. p. 7. Archived from the original on 17 July 2021.
