= Hollandsch Inlandsche Kweekschool =

Dutch East Indies teacher training school

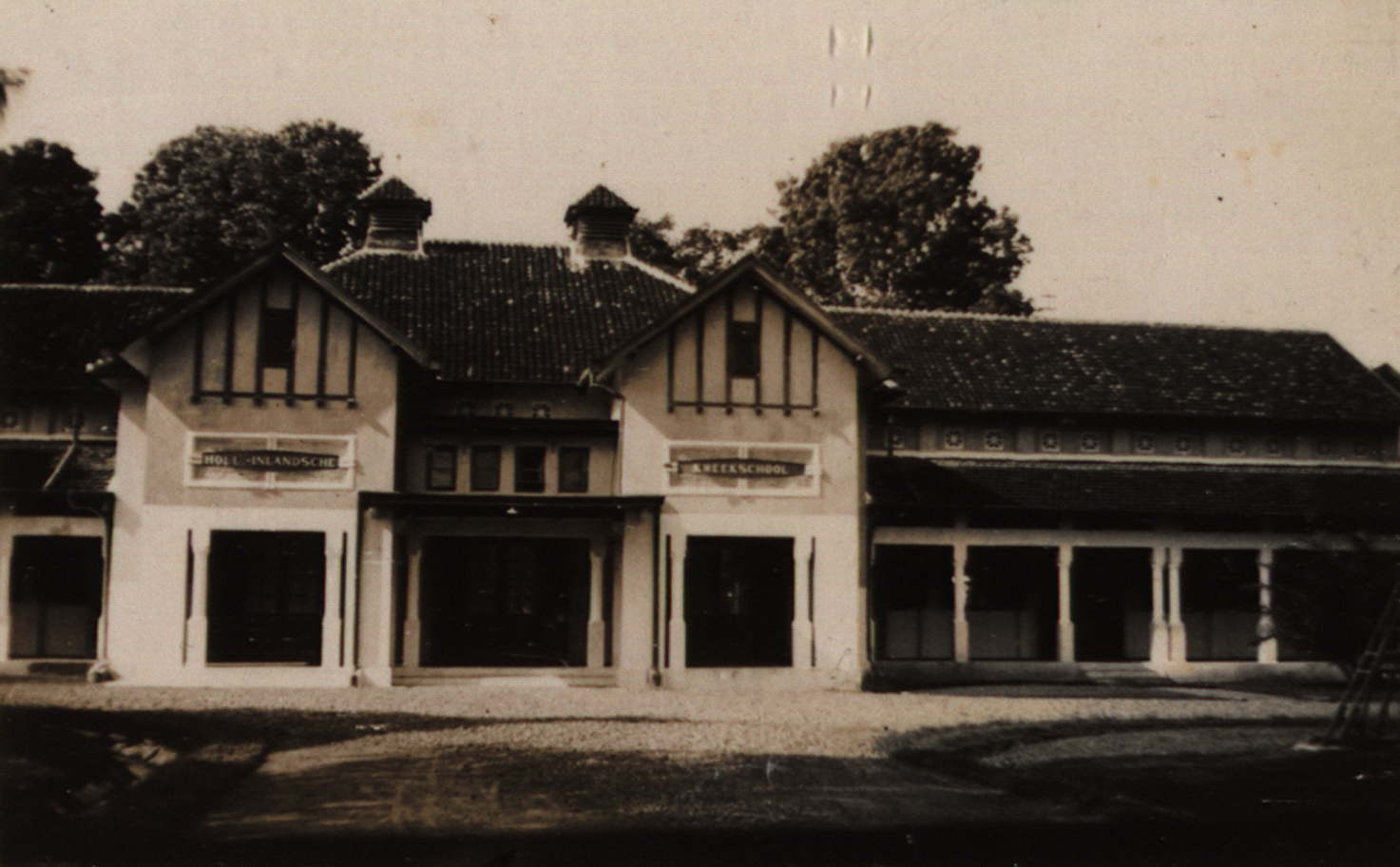
A Hollandsch-Inlandsche Kweekschool in Blitar, Java, c.1920

The Hollandsch Inlandsche Kweekschool (Dutch for Dutch native development school), often abbreviated as HIK, were a type of Christian Dutch language auxiliary teacher training schools for Indonesian students in the Dutch East Indies in the early twentieth century. There were other types of teacher training schools in the Indies, including Hoogere Kweek School which trained teachers at a higher level, and Taman Siswa and Muhammadiyah schools which were outside of the colonial system and affiliated with the Indonesian nationalist movement. Because the HIK schools were more accessible than other forms of European education for native Indonesians, a number of figures who later rose to prominence in the late colonial and early independence era were educated in HIK schools.

== History ==
Older types of teacher training schools for native students had been established by missionaries in the Indies dating back to the nineteenth century; the first may have been opened in Ambon in 1834. They expanded to various parts of the Indies and generally had Malay as their language of instruction.

The HIK schools were a new development of the early twentieth century with the Dutch Ethical Policy which was in force after 1901. They were concentrated in Java, the most developed part of the Indies, and were established to train native students to become primary school assistant teachers in Hollandsch-Inlandsche Schools or Mission staff. Unlike the older types of schools, the language of instruction was Dutch and the length of the program was generally six years. Students who graduated from HIK and wanted to continue to higher education still had to pass exams from the higher AMS level schools to be allowed to proceed. Students were often Christians or converts to Christianity, but Muslim students were also allowed to attend. There were such schools in Magelang, Blitar, Surakarta, Yogyakarta and Bandung, and later in Sumatra and other parts of the Indies.

== Notable graduates ==
- Gondulphus Doeriat (1913–98), politician
- Tan Malaka (1897 - 1949), National Hero of Indonesia
- Sanusi Hardjadinata (1914–95), politician
- Amir Pasaribu (1915–2010), composer and music critic
- A. J. Witono (1925–89), military officer
- Arie Frederik Lasut (1918–49), National Hero of Indonesia
- Aswismarmo (1925–2011), diplomat and bureaucrat
- Albertus Maruli Tambunan (1925–2019), military officer and bureaucrat
- Maludin Simbolon, (1916–2000), military officer
