= NIROM =

Radio broadcaster in Dutch East Indies, 1928–1942

Nederlandsch-Indische Radio-Omroep Maatschappij
- Type: Radio network
- Country: Dutch East Indies
- Founded: 1928
- Radio transmitters: 27 (1939)
- Headquarters: Bandung
- Launch date: 1 April 1934

NIROM (Nederlands-Indische Radio-Omroep-Maatschappij; historically also spelled Nederlandsch-Indische Radio Omroep Maatschappij) was a radio broadcasting company in the Dutch East Indies. It operated regular broadcasts in the colony from 1934 until the Japanese occupation of the Dutch East Indies in 1942. NIROM was distinct from Philips Omroep Holland-Indië (PHOHI), which transmitted short-wave programmes from the Netherlands to the Indies; NIROM provided a broadcasting system within the archipelago itself.

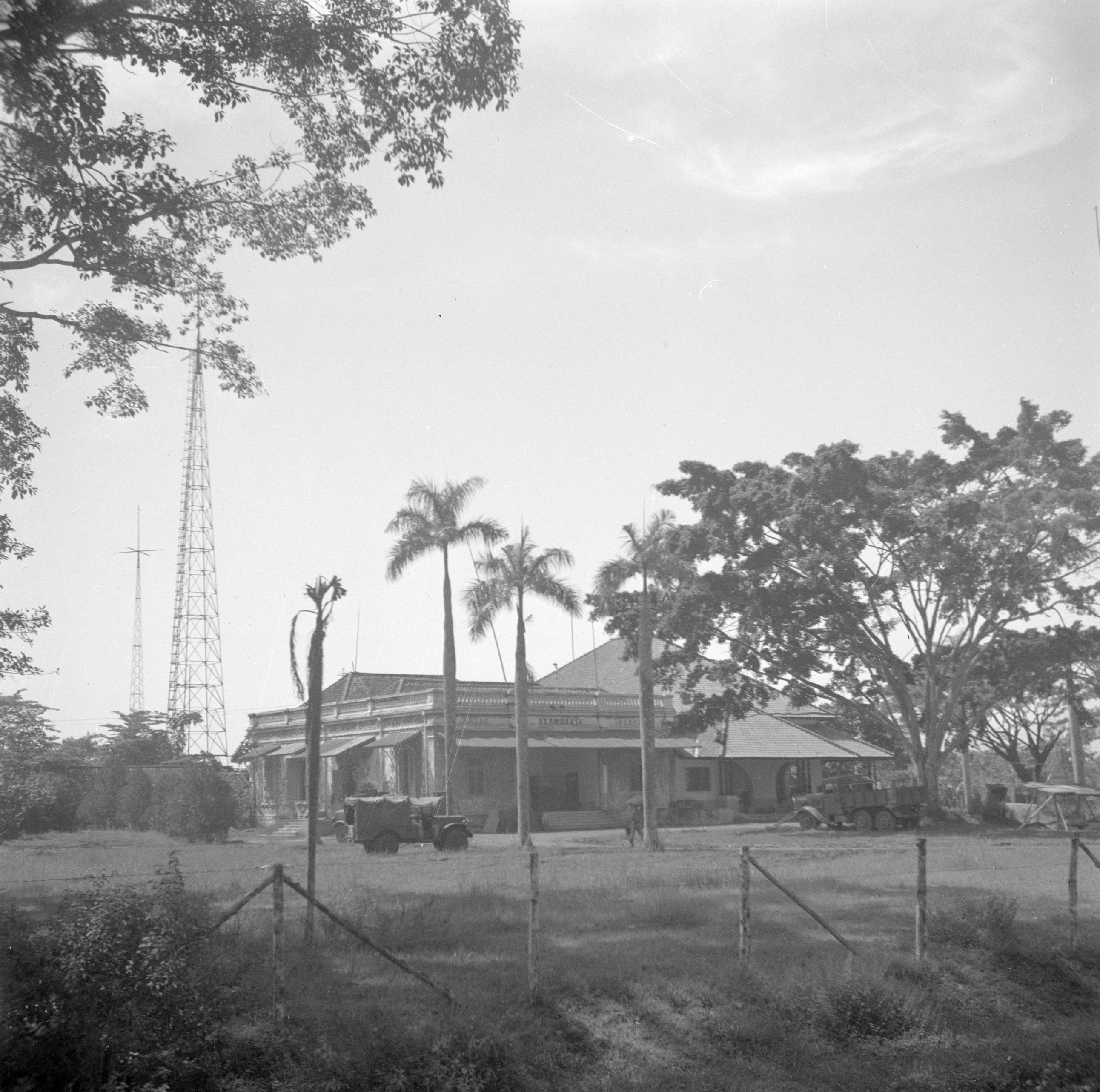
NIROM transmitter masts in Bandoeng, photographed in 1946.

NIROM was incorporated in Amsterdam in December 1928 with capital from Radio-Holland, the Philips group and Maintz & Co. Its broadcasting concession made it the official colonial broadcaster, but it operated in a wider field that included European listener associations, religious broadcasters and ketimuran or “Eastern” radio societies.

== Background ==
Legal radio broadcasting in the Dutch East Indies began before NIROM. In 1925, the Batavia Radio Vereeniging began Dutch-language broadcasts from the Hotel des Indes in Batavia. Early broadcasting was local and association-based, with operating expenses covered by members of listener societies.

By the early 1930s, radio in the colony included European listener associations, Christian broadcasting initiatives and Indonesian cultural broadcasters. The Solosche Radio Vereeniging, founded in Solo in 1933 after court-based broadcasts from a kraton, became an important outlet for live gamelan and other Javanese cultural performance.

Radio policy in the Dutch East Indies developed alongside Dutch intercontinental broadcasting. PHOHI, established with Philips capital, transmitted from the Netherlands to the Indies, while NIROM was intended to develop broadcasting within the colony. Dutch advocates of imperial radio treated shortwave broadcasting as a way to maintain cultural and political links between the Netherlands and the Indies and to compete with foreign stations audible in the colony.

== Establishment and regulation ==
NIROM was incorporated in Amsterdam in December 1928. communications, Philips in radio technology and overseas broadcasting, and Maintz & Co. in colonial electricity and trading enterprises.

A proposal from NIROM was debated in the Volksraad in 1930, and the colonial government granted the company a ten-year concession in 1933. Private radio societies were allowed to remain on the air, but NIROM received official status and access to the licence-fee system. The colonial Post, Telegraph and Telephone Service collected radio fees and owned transmitting stations, while advisory structures supervised programming.

The concession required NIROM to take account of listeners' wishes, but also prohibited broadcasts that conflicted with the interests of the state, the law, public order or morality. Spoken programming was therefore more closely supervised than music. The authorities and NIROM's advisory bodies were concerned about party propaganda, religious conflict and political mobilization, especially in broadcasts aimed at non-European audiences.

Karel Willem Leonard Bezemer served as General Director for Broadcasting at NIROM during the early period of regular broadcasting. He wrote in 1934 on the practical need for gramophone records in radio programming, especially for European classical repertory that could not easily be performed live in the Indies. He became later known as a Dutch maritime historian and writer on the Royal Netherlands Navy and merchant shipping during the Second World War.

== Advisory council ==
NIROM's Raad van Advies ("Advisory Council") was installed in April 1934 as an advisory and supervisory body for the broadcaster. It was intended to mediate between NIROM and radio owners in the Dutch East Indies and to help ensure that broadcasts did not endanger public order.

An early official listing gave the council's chair as M. van Loon and its members as Ir. W. Baron van Slingelandt, K.W.L. Bezemer, Mr C.C. van Helsdingen, Mr G.A. Lamsvelt, C.J.M. van der Linden, J.G. Prins, E.W. Schultz and R.A.A. Wiranata Koesoema, with C.W.L. Schell as secretary. The composition later changed. C. Hillen, director of the Indies PTT, became an influential appointed chair of the council, and in 1939 he was succeeded as chair by D.R.K. de Boer while remaining attached to NIROM as government representative.

The council did not constitute a representative sample of all NIROM listeners. Its members were Java-based Dutch men from the upper-middle class or higher and were generally linked to institutions with an interest in broadcasting. The council included representatives of Dutch radio and cultural organizations, Christian broadcasting interests, and, initially, one representative of indigenous listeners, R.A.A. Wiranata Koesoema, the regent of Bandung and a member of the Volksraad. After the 1936 elections, the “Eastern” representation was enlarged with a Javanese representative of the Solosche Radio Vereeniging and a Chinese radio amateur connected with several non-Western radio clubs in Java.

== Transmitters and coverage ==
NIROM's technical system combined long-distance archipelzenders ("achipelago transmitters") with smaller regional and local transmitters. The problem was geographical: the Dutch East Indies was a dispersed island colony in which ordinary local broadcasting could not provide colony-wide coverage. After the concession was granted, regular broadcasting was delayed while antenna parks and transmission facilities were built.

By 1937, NIROM's network covered the archipelago. A NIROM leaflet from 1939 described a network of 27 transmitters: five high-power archipelago transmitters and fourteen local transmitters for the Western programme, and one archipelago transmitter and seven local transmitters for the Eastern programme. The same leaflet stated that the Western programme was distributed from Batavia over telephone lines to nineteen transmitters, while the Eastern programme was divided between sections fed from Soerabaja and from Batavia or Bandoeng. These sections could be coupled, creating a larger combined distribution network.

NIROM's 1939 technical description distinguished between long-distance transmitters using wavelengths below 100 metres and regional or local stations using wavelengths between 100 and 200 metres. It also described directional transmission for areas such as Sumatra, Borneo and Celebes. By the end of Dutch colonial rule, NIROM had studios in Batavia, Bandoeng, Soerabaja, Semarang and Medan, with relay stations in Solo, Yogyakarta, Cepu, Malang, Sukabumi, Cirebon, Buitenzorg and Padang.

== Programming and audiences ==
NIROM's service was divided into a Western programme and an Eastern programme. The division reflected the growth of non-European radio listening and demands for more programming addressed to listeners categorized as “Eastern”. From September 1934, NIROM used separate frequencies for the two services, allowing different programmes to be transmitted at the same time. The arrangement also responded to complaints from Western listeners about hearing Eastern music, especially gamelan, through or behind Western broadcasts.

The Indonesian/Malay term ketimuran, from timur (“east”), corresponded to the Dutch colonial term Oostersch. In the radio context it did not mean only Indonesian-language or nationalist Indonesian broadcasting. It referred to a broad colonial category of non-Western audiences and cultural forms, including indigenous Indonesian, Malay, Chinese, Arab and Eurasian listeners and repertories.

The political argument for Eastern broadcasting became more explicit in the later conflict over the Perikatan Perkoempoelan Radio Ketimoeran (PPRK). In 1938, Sutardjo Kertohadikusumo defended Eastern radio in the Volksraad through an appeal later rendered in scholarship as “Let us become radio mechanics”. PPRK argued that Eastern broadcasting should be organized by Eastern broadcasters themselves, and in 1940 it took over NIROM's Eastern programming while continuing to use NIROM transmitters.

The separation of Western and Eastern programming did not produce wholly separate audiences. Common broadcasts were used for official occasions such as New Year ceremonies, royal birthdays and the opening of the parliamentary year, sometimes with translations into Malay and other languages. Musical categories also crossed the official distinction between Western and Eastern listeners.

Radio ownership was limited by the cost of receivers, licence fees and uneven access to electricity. In 1939 there were 87,510 radio licence holders in the Netherlands East Indies, including 25,608 Indonesians. In 1940, official figures counted about 50,000 receiving sets among Europeans, 20,000 among people categorized as Chinese and Arab, and 32,000 among indigenous Indonesians.

== Music and gramophone records ==
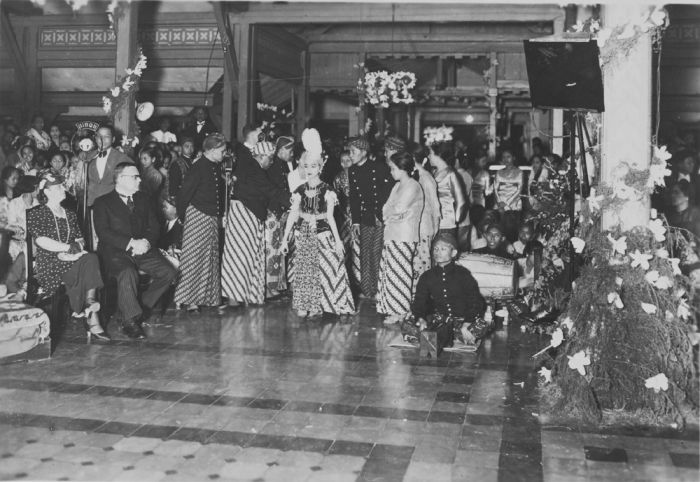
A dance performance in a kraton being reported by NIROM, between 1928 and 1940.

Music dominated NIROM's programming. In October 1936, music accounted for more than 70 per cent of radio programmes and about 83 per cent of programming hours in the material analysed from Soeara NIROM. By January 1942, when wartime news occupied more airtime, music still accounted for about 44 per cent of programmes and 69 per cent of broadcasting hours.

A strong reliance on gramophone records was not unique to NIROM. In European broadcasting, recorded-sound collections in the 1930s initially consisted largely of commercial music discs, later supplemented by recordings of radio music, spoken word and sound effects. In the Dutch East Indies, records were especially useful because they were cheaper than live performance, could fill airtime and provided repertory for which local performers were not readily available.

The use of records was uneven across NIROM's services. The Western programme relied heavily on gramophone music: available tabulations indicate that 68 per cent of music broadcasts in 1935 and 82 per cent in 1937 were from records. At the same time, live performance was often presented as more desirable. The Eastern programme was criticized in its early years for relying on records at inconvenient hours, and later NIROM publicity treated the expansion of live performance as an improvement.

== Artists and publications ==
NIROM published Soeara NIROM from 1934 to 1942 for Indonesian-reading audiences. The magazine introduced broadcasts, performers and musical culture connected with the Eastern programme. Its coverage shows the importance of kroncong, Javanese music, Sundanese music, Malay, Chinese and Arabic musical genres in NIROM's Indonesian-language radio culture.

Featured performers included Annie Landouw, an Eurasian singer associated in programme material with kroncong rumba, and kroncong singers S. Abdullah and Miss Iem. Malay and bangsawan-linked repertory included singers such as Miss Maimoon, Miss Tjiah, Miss Salmah and Miss Riboet. Arabic and gambus programming included Syech Albar, a Hadhrami Arab performer from Soerabaja, and his gambus orchestra.

Programme evidence from 1938 also includes Koesbini, Miss Tioe and broadcasts by Gamboes Orkest “Pemoeda” under H. Moh. Jasin Al Djawi. By 1942, Malay music programming included groups such as Penghiboer Hati, Sinar Medan and Patjaran Muda, while gambus groups were associated with Batavia, Semarang, Medan and Garut.

Miss Riboet remained associated in later memory with Indies popular entertainment and radio listening. In a 1996 newspaper essay on the writer Dé-Lilah and stamboel theatre, Rudy Kousbroek recalled having heard Miss Riboet on NIROM as a child.

The boundaries between Western and Eastern musical categories were porous. Jazz and kroncong were sometimes treated as separate genres for separate audiences, but both circulated across social categories. Music from Ambon and Manado could be reclassified for Western listeners, while kroncong became one of the most visible musical forms of NIROM's Eastern broadcasts.

== Local broadcasting societies ==
NIROM operated alongside a wider field of local radio societies. The first organized group, the Bataviase Radio Vereeniging, began broadcasting in 1925. After NIROM became the official broadcaster, private groups were allowed to continue, but they lacked NIROM's resources and transmission power.

European-oriented private broadcasters served mainly Dutch-speaking audiences. Four such groups formed the Omroep Vereeniging in Java and began publishing the joint programme guide Radio-Bode in 1935: BRV in Batavia, PMY in Bandoeng, RVMJ in Semarang and ARVO in Soerabaja. The main institutional distinction was that the private groups were answerable to members, while NIROM answered to the colonial authorities and was funded by compulsory licence fees.

The ketimuran stations broadcast primarily in Malay/Indonesian and concentrated on programming for indigenous Indonesian, Eurasian and Chinese-Indonesian listeners. The earliest was the Solosche Radio Vereeniging (SRV) in Solo, associated with Mangkunegara VII and the Mangkunegaran court. Other ketimuran stations included MAVRO in Yogyakarta, VORO in Batavia, CIRVO in Soerabaja, SRI in Solo, VORL in Bandoeng and Radio Semarang.

NIROM's relationship with the ketimuran broadcasters was cooperative, competitive and supervisory. After complaints from Indonesian and Chinese listeners about limited Eastern programming, NIROM developed separate Western and Eastern services and paid subsidies to SRV, VORO and MAVRO to provide or organize live Eastern programming. By August 1935, NIROM was effectively broadcasting five different Eastern programmes: Batavia, Bandoeng, Yogyakarta, Solo/Semarang and Soerabaja.

The relationship deteriorated when NIROM sought more direct control over Eastern broadcasting. In 1936, NIROM announced that it would handle all Eastern broadcasting itself and reduce subsidies to private stations. The dispute led in March 1937 to the creation of the Perikatan Perkoempoelan Radio Ketimoeran, a federation of Eastern radio associations. Its members included VORO, MAVRO, SRV, VORL, Radio Semarang and CIRVO.

PPRK argued that Eastern broadcasting should be managed by Eastern broadcasters themselves. In August 1938, the Volksraad approved the transfer of ketimuran broadcasting from NIROM to PPRK, and in November 1940 PPRK took over all Eastern broadcasting while continuing to use NIROM transmitters. The arrangement lasted until the Japanese occupation in March 1942.

Christian broadcasting societies also sought access to the colonial ether. Protestant NICRO and Catholic IKROS mainly lobbied for religious airtime on local stations and on NIROM rather than functioning like the local music-oriented listener societies.

== Politics, censorship and foreign broadcasts ==
NIROM operated in a colonial public sphere in which radio was treated as both a public service and a potential political risk. Programme supervision was intended to prevent party propaganda, material considered offensive to religion or morality, and broadcasts thought to threaten public order. Monitoring the Eastern programme posed practical problems because it used languages that not all officials could understand.

Political sensitivity could arise even in cultural programming. At a meeting of NIROM's advisory council on 25 June 1936, members discussed an earlier live Eastern-programme broadcast of a football match organized by the PSSI. During the event, the orchestra played Wilhelmus when the PSSI president entered the field, while the crowd sang Indonesia Raya. The incident illustrated the political sensitivity of live cultural and sporting broadcasts, because nationalist symbolism could enter programmes that were not formally political.

Listeners in the Dutch East Indies could also receive foreign shortwave broadcasts. German shortwave broadcasts from Zeesen appeared in Indies newspaper radio listings under headings such as “Zeesen (Azië-programma)”, with call signs including DJB, DJN, DJQ, DJA and DJE. Some listings explicitly included Dutch-language material, such as “Nederlandsch over DJB” and “Nederlandsch DJA en DJB”, while others advertised Dutch-themed entertainment such as “Hollandsch Cabaret”.

After 1933, the German shortwave station was part of Nazi Germany's foreign broadcasting apparatus.The Deutscher Kurzwellensender was created as an overseas station after the Gleichschaltung of German radio, with Kurt von Boeckmann appointed to direct the station and to head the foreign department of the Reichs-Rundfunk-Gesellschaft. In November 1935, De Indische Courant announced a special German shortwave programme for the Dutch East Indies titled “Gruesse an Insulinde”.

Japanese broadcasts to the archipelago played a more direct role in the campaign against Dutch rule. Before and during the invasion, Japanese overseas radio addressed listeners in the Indies in Malay or Indonesian, Dutch and other languages. Japanese broadcasting policy deliberately used the name “Indonesia” rather than “Netherlands East Indies” and presented Japanese victory as part of Asian liberation from Western rule. Radio Tokyo and related Japanese overseas services used Indonesian nationalist symbols, including Indonesia Raya, while subordinating local nationalist aspirations to the Japanese war effort.

In the final phase of the invasion, Japanese broadcasting included black propaganda. A team at the Saigon station broadcast as “Radio Bandung”, falsely claiming to transmit from inside the colony. The broadcasts in Dutch and Malay suggested that Dutch surrender was unavoidable and that negotiations had begun.

== Staff and contributors ==
Named NIROM broadcasters and contributors included Bert Garthoff, Erik de Vries and Rob Nieuwenhuys. Garthoff was a NIROM announcer in Bandoeng at the time of the Dutch capitulation to Japan. Erik Klaas de Vries became a NIROM announcer after arriving in the Dutch East Indies in 1940 and later moved into wartime film work; after the war he became associated with the development of Dutch television.

Rob Nieuwenhuys, later known as a writer and literary historian of Dutch-Indies literature, was among former NIROM broadcasting employees interviewed in a 1987 KRO retrospective on NIROM. In that programme he recalled contributing a literary programme to NIROM. Nieuwenhuys returned to Indonesia after the war, worked on cultural affairs, edited Oriëntatie, wrote book reviews and gave a weekly radio talk before leaving Indonesia in 1952.

== Japanese occupation and aftermath ==
Dutch colonial rule in the Indies collapsed during the Dutch East Indies campaign of 1941–1942. On 8 March 1942, after the Japanese advance on Bandoeng, Lieutenant-General Hein ter Poorten announced that organized resistance by the Royal Netherlands East Indies Army in the Bandoeng area had ended.

Bert Garthoff's broadcast from Bandoeng on 8 March 1942 became a symbolic memory of the collapse of Dutch colonial radio. The episode is not accurately described as the literal final use of NIROM's transmitters. After the Dutch capitulation, broadcasting continued for a time under Japanese orders and censorship before Dutch-language broadcasting was ended under the occupation.

A 1946 account in The ABC Weekly stated that Japanese authorities ordered NIROM staff to continue as usual after the takeover and that broadcasts continued to end with the Wilhelmus. The same account stated that three NIROM employees were later executed after the Japanese discovered the significance of the music.

During the Japanese occupation, Dutch-language broadcasting was eventually banned and the broadcasting system was reorganized under Japanese control. The Japanese established the Java Broadcasting Superintendent Bureau on 1 October 1942 under Japanese management, with staff from NHK and Indonesians who had previously worked for NIROM. Broadcasting was used for government notices, news, language instruction, speeches, music and propaganda.

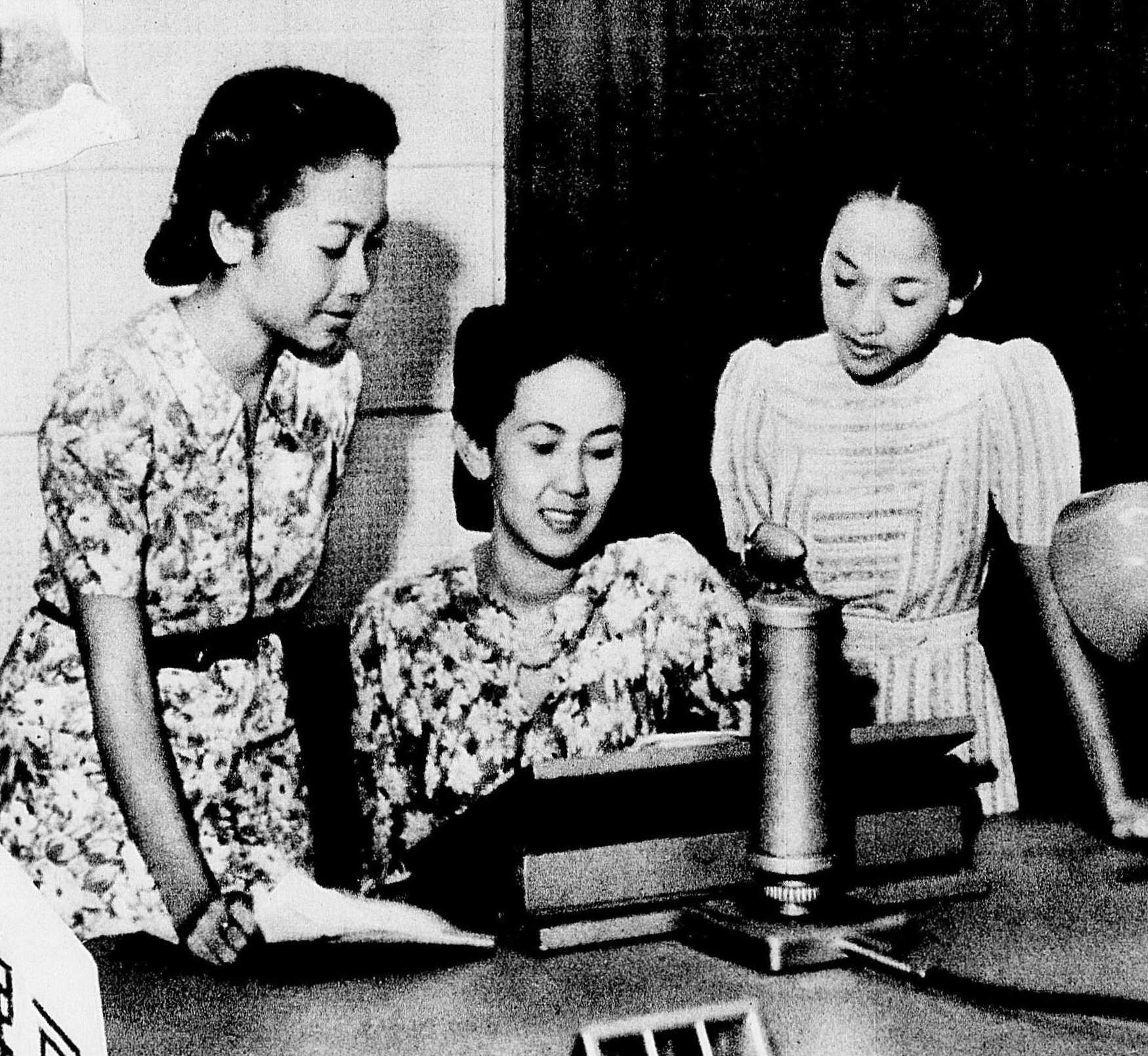
Female broadcasters at the former NIROM facilities, 1943.

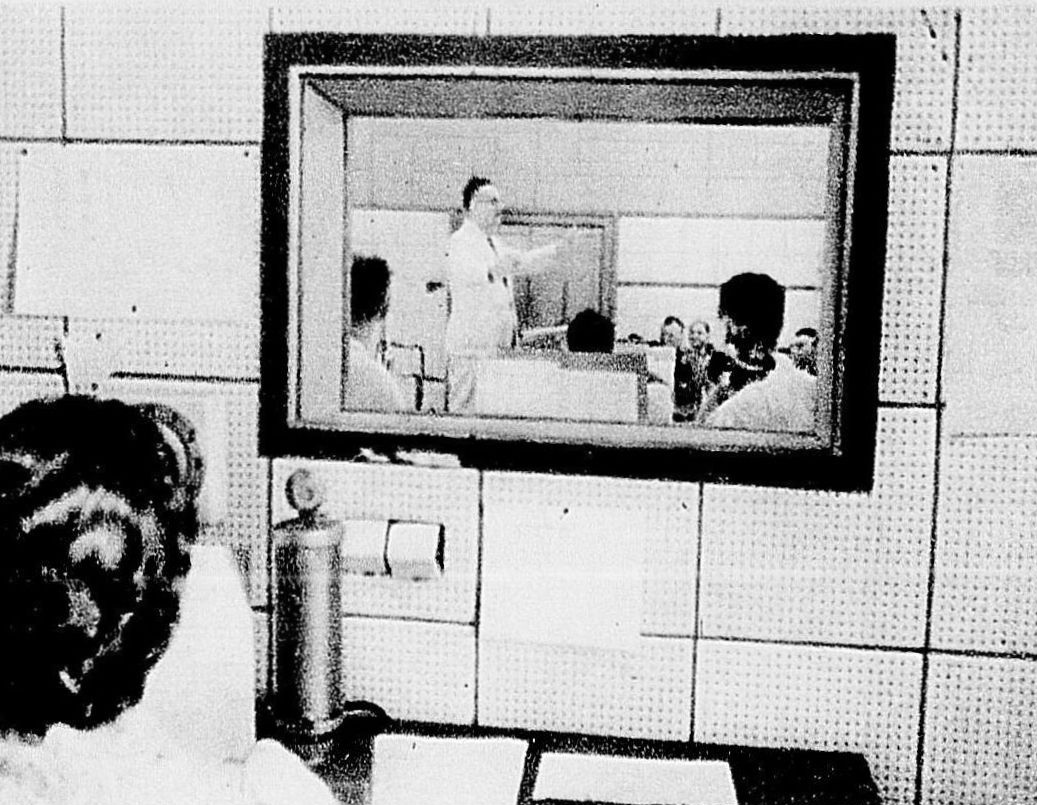
A broadcaster at the former NIROM facilities, 1943.

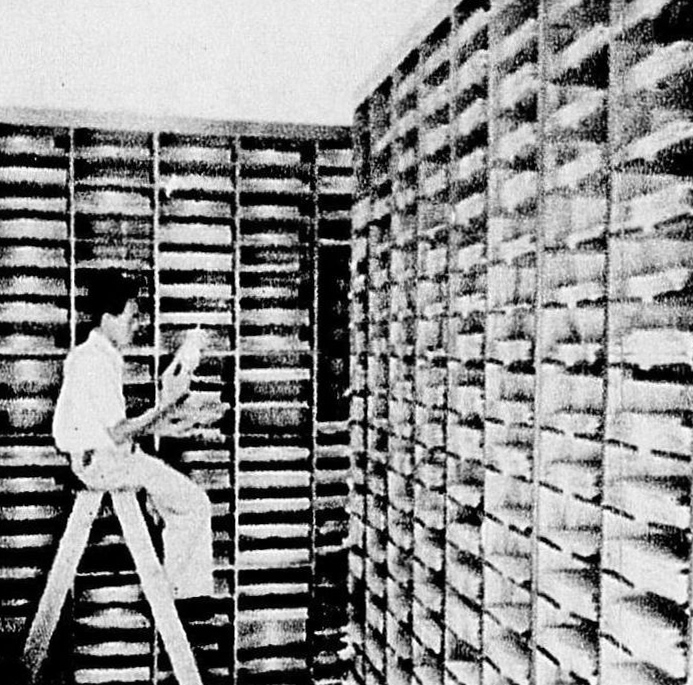
Record storage at the former NIROM facilities, 1943.

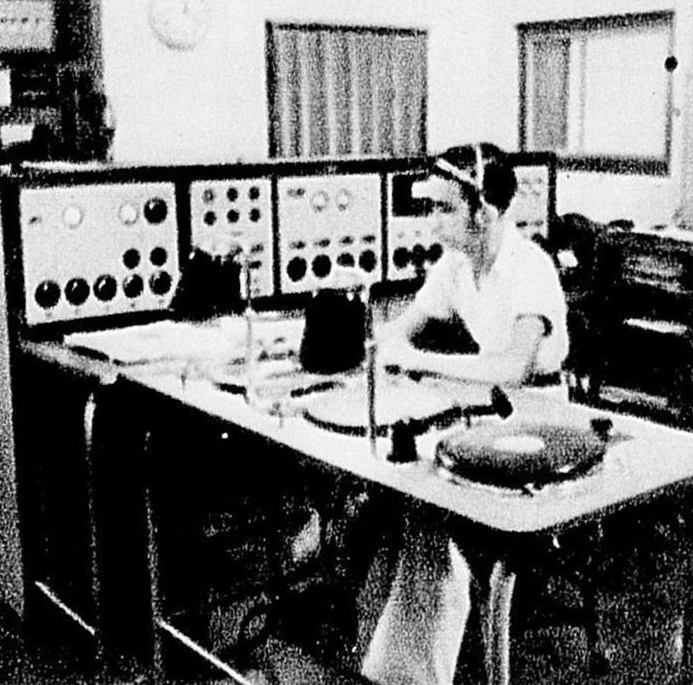
A technician at the former NIROM facilities, 1943.

Because few Indonesians owned receivers, the Japanese occupation authorities installed public loudspeakers in markets, railway stations, streets, parks and squares. By February 1944, about 1,500 public loudspeakers had been erected in Java.

After the Proclamation of Indonesian Independence in August 1945, Indonesian broadcasters established Radio Republik Indonesia on 11 September 1945. RRI developed from the wartime broadcasting apparatus and from the experience of Indonesian radio workers under Japanese occupation.

During the [Indonesian War of Independance, Republican and Dutch-backed broadcasting did not simply succeed one another. Radio Republik Indonesia and the Dutch-backed Radio Omroep in Overgangstijd (ROIO) operated as rival broadcasting organizations before the transfer of sovereignty. On 27 December 1949, they were fused into Radio Republik Indonesia Serikat; ROIO was to be dissolved, and the property, rights, obligations and broadcasting facilities of both organizations were taken over by the new federal broadcaster. The studio network was then reorganized into national, regional, sub-regional, local and relay stations, with Indonesian and Dutch personnel still present in the central Jakarta organization during the transition. Dutch-language broadcasting in independent Indonesia was discontinued in 1954, in the context of the escalating dispute with the Netherlands over Western New Guinea.

== Surviving recordings ==
Agus Salim speech, 15 January 1941
Agus Salim addressing Dutchmen via a NIROM-Radio Oranje relay

Van Kleffens address for NIROM, 5 May 1941
A wartime radio address by Eelco van Kleffens for NIROM in Batavia.

NIROM broadcast, 1 March 1942
A surviving NIROM-wartime broadcast from March 1942, relayed to Europe via Radio Oranje.

Surviving recordings linked to NIROM are held in audiovisual archives, but they do not constitute a complete archive of NIROM broadcasts. The public catalogue of the Netherlands Institute for Sound and Vision lists a recording of a Queen's Day celebration in the Dutch East Indies from 31 August 1935, relayed to the Netherlands by NIROM. It also lists a 1936 audio item connected with the first colonisation congress in Batavia, including speeches and talks recorded in 1935.

Other catalogue entries linked to NIROM include a 1937 interview with P. A. Kerstens on Catholicism in the Dutch East Indies and IKROS activity with NIROM; a 1940 recording of Winston Churchill's “Every Man to His Post” speech, catalogued as having been broadcast via NIROM; and a 1941 speech from Batavia by Agus Salim in the series Stemmen uit Nederlands-Indië, relayed to Europe via Radio Oranje.

The archive also includes 1934 Londen–Melbourne Race radio material with Batavia-related reporting and later programmes that contain reused colonial radio fragments. Some items are NIROM productions, some are relays or associated broadcasts, and some are later compilations rather than complete surviving NIROM transmissions.

== Regional comparison ==
In regional perspective, radio in the Dutch East Indies combined an official colonial broadcaster with European listener associations and organized indigenous radio societies. This differed from the more centralized late-1930s development of broadcasting in Singapore and British Malaya, the radio-club and urban-listening culture of French Indochina, the commercial American-influenced system in the Philippines, and the state-building use of radio in post-1932 Thailand.

In Singapore and British Malaya, broadcasting began with amateur and commercial initiatives, but by the late 1930s it had moved toward a more centralized colonial structure. The British Malaya Broadcasting Corporation received an exclusive licence in 1935, began regular service from Caldecott Hill in 1937 and was acquired by the colonial government in 1940 as the Malayan Broadcasting Corporation.

In French Indochina, radio developed through organizations such as the Radio-Club de l'Indochine du Nord and Radio Saigon. The colonial state initially showed relatively limited interest, and radio listening became part of urban social life. Unlike the Dutch East Indies, the Indochinese case was not marked by an institutional struggle between an official colonial broadcaster and organized “Eastern” radio associations comparable to the NIROM–PPRK conflict.

In the Philippines, radio began under American colonial rule in 1922 and developed through a more commercial and American-influenced model. In Siam/Thailand, which was not colonized, radio became closely associated with state-building after the Siamese revolution of 1932, as the People's Party government used broadcasting to legitimize the new political order and promote constitutionalism.

== Works cited ==
=== Secondary sources ===
- Birdsall, Carolyn (2022). "Tracing the Archival Lives of Radio: Recorded Sound Collections in Belgian and Dutch Radio (1930s–1950s)". TMG Journal for Media History. 25 (2): 1–30. doi:10.18146/tmg.819.
- Bruijn, J. R. (1989). "Review of K.W.L. Bezemer, Geschiedenis van de Nederlandse Koopvaardij in de tweede wereldoorlog". Bijdragen en Mededelingen betreffende de Geschiedenis der Nederlanden. 104 (1): 117–120.
- Chua, Ai Lin (April 2016). "The Story of Singapore Radio (1924–41)". BiblioAsia. National Library Board Singapore.
- De Jong, Loe (1984). Het Koninkrijk der Nederlanden in de Tweede Wereldoorlog (PDF) (in Dutch). Vol. 11a: Nederlands-Indië I, eerste helft. The Hague: Staatsuitgeverij.
- DeWald, Erich (2012). "Taking to the Waves: Vietnamese Society around the Radio in the 1930s". Modern Asian Studies. 46 (1): 143–165. doi:10.1017/S0026749X11000606.
- Hasselbring, Bettina (26 February 2025). "Kurt von Boeckmann: Der erste Intendant". BR.de (in German). Bayerischer Rundfunk.
- Jansen Hendriks, Gerda (2014). Een voorbeeldige kolonie: Nederlands-Indië in 50 jaar overheidsfilms, 1912–1962 (PDF) (PhD thesis). University of Amsterdam.
- Jose, Ricardo T. (February 2009). "Reading Radio Texts" (PDF). Plaridel. 6 (1): 161–166.
- Kousbroek, Rudy (13 September 1996). "De eerste Deli-tabaksroman; Zes vergeten romans van de Indische schrijfster Dé-Lilah". NRC Handelsblad (in Dutch).
- Kuitenbrouwer, Vincent (2016). "Radio as a Tool of Empire: Intercontinental Broadcasting from the Netherlands to the Dutch East Indies in the 1920s and 1930s" (PDF). Itinerario. 40 (1): 83–103. doi:10.1017/S0165115316000061.
- Kuitenbrouwer, Vincent (20 March 2024). "La maison de verre revisitée: la radiodiffusion et les angles morts de l'État colonial tardif dans les Indes néerlandaises (années 1920 et 1930)". RadioMorphoses (in French) (11). Translated by Leyris, Thomas. doi:10.4000/radiomorphoses.4394.
- Kurasawa, Aiko (October 1987). "Propaganda Media on Java under the Japanese 1942–1945" (PDF). Indonesia (44): 59–116. doi:10.2307/3351221.
- Lindsay, Jennifer (October 1997). "Making Waves: Private Radio and Local Identities in Indonesia". Indonesia (64): 105–123. doi:10.2307/3351437.
- Maas, Willem. "Rob Nieuwenhuys". In Bax, Sander; Brems, Hugo; Van Deel, Tom; Zuiderent, Ad (eds.). Kritisch lexicon van de moderne Nederlandstalige literatuur. DBNL.
- Mrázek, Rudolf (1997). "'Let Us Become Radio Mechanics': Technology and National Identity in Late-Colonial Netherlands East Indies". Comparative Studies in Society and History. 39 (1): 3–33. doi:10.1017/S0010417597000017.
- Oliwkowski, Christina (2025). Die [Heeres-]Hauptfunkstelle Königs Wusterhausen: eine rundfunkgeschichtliche und lokalhistorische Fallstudie (PDF) (in German).
- Puguh, Dhanang Respati (2017). "Radio Republik Indonesia Surakarta, 1945–1960s: Its Role in Efforts to Maintain Indonesian Independence and the Formation of National Culture". Indonesian Historical Studies. 1 (2): 138–153. doi:10.14710/ihis.v1i2.1919.
- Robbins, Jane M. J. (1998). Japanese Overseas Radio Broadcasting, 1937–1945 (PDF) (PhD thesis). University of Sheffield.
- Stutje, Klaas (2022). The History of the Indonesian Dutch Restitution Debate: A Scoping Research (Report). KITLV / Pressing Matter.
- "Deutscher Kurzwellensender für Nazi-Propaganda bekommt Intendanten". SWR Kultur Archivradio (in German). Südwestrundfunk. 27 May 2025.
- Takonai, Susumu (30 September 2006). "Soeara NIROM and Musical Culture in Colonial Indonesia" 植民地期インドネシアにおけるラジオ放送の開始と音楽文化――『NIROM の声』が描く音楽文化―― (PDF). Southeast Asian Studies. 44 (2): 145–203. doi:10.20495/tak.44.2_145.
- Thepsongkraow, Suphat (2026). "Revolution Through the Airwaves: Radio Broadcasting and Thai Politics, 1932–1938". Journal of Arts and Thai Studies.
- Wierema, Thijs (1982). Rob Nieuwenhuys: Leven tussen twee vaderlanden. De Engelbewaarder.
- Yampolsky, Philip (2014). "Music on Dutch East Indies Radio in 1938: Representations of Unity, Disunity, and the Modern". In Barendregt, Bart (ed.). Sonic Modernities in the Malay World: A History of Popular Music, Social Distinction and Novel Lifestyles (1930s–2000s) (PDF). Verhandelingen van het Koninklijk Instituut voor Taal-, Land- en Volkenkunde. Vol. 290. Leiden: Brill. pp. 47–112. doi:10.1163/9789004261778_003.

=== Primary, archival and catalogue sources ===
- "Radio Chief Held at Gunpoint". The ABC Weekly. Australian Broadcasting Commission. 29 June 1946. p. 6 – via Trove.
- Hadji Agoes Salim: toespraak uit Batavia in de serie 'Stemmen uit Nederlands-Indië' - 12111 (Audio). Nederlands Instituut voor Beeld & Geluid. 16 January 1941. 2101608080068801731.
- Radiorede 'Every Man to His Post' van Winston Churchill - 12091 (Audio). Nederlands Instituut voor Beeld & Geluid. 11 September 1940. 2101608080068965731.
- Niet bekend - 38917 (Audio). Nederlands Instituut voor Beeld & Geluid. 1 September 1936. 2101608080068472831.
- Niet bekend - 18081 (Audio). Nederlands Instituut voor Beeld & Geluid. 2 December 1937. 2101608080068489031.
- Londen-Melbourne Race (Audio series). Nederlands Instituut voor Beeld & Geluid. 1934.
- Viering koninginnedag Nederlands Oost-Indië (Audio). Nederlands Instituut voor Beeld & Geluid. 31 August 1935. 2101608080068513231.
- "Gruesse an Insulinde". De Indische Courant. 11 November 1935. p. 14 – via Delpher.
- Oogluik (Audio). Oogluik. KRO. 12 April 1987. 2101608090077175631 – via Nederlands Instituut voor Beeld & Geluid.
- "Oost-Indië: Stamkaarten Ambtenaren, Achternaam: Bezemer" (in Dutch). Nationaal Archief.
- "Inventaris van het archief van Maintz & Co" (in Dutch). Nationaal Archief.
- NIROM (1939). "The Netherlands Indies Broadcasting Company Ltd". Radio Heritage Foundation. Reprinted by Jack Fox, 2004.
- "Radio-programma". Het nieuws van den dag voor Nederlandsch-Indië. 2 July 1935. p. 19 – via Delpher.
- "Radio-programma". De locomotief. 25 June 1936. p. 3 – via Delpher.
- "Radio-programma". Het nieuws van den dag voor Nederlandsch-Indië. 10 September 1937. p. 19 – via Delpher.
- "N.V. Nederlandsch-Indische Radio-Omroep Maatschappij (N.I.R.O.M.)". Regeeringsalmanak voor Nederlandsch-Indië 1935. 1935. p. 623.
- "Kata perpisahan dan kata penjamboetan". Soeara NIROM (in Indonesian). 5 February 1939.
