= Kris Mataram =

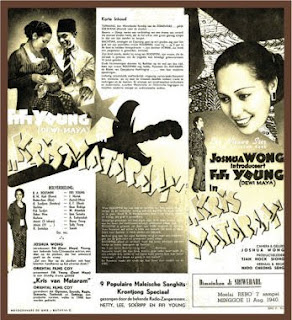
- Theatrical poster
- Directed by: Njoo Cheong Seng
- Starring: Fifi Young; Omar Rodriga
- Cinematography: Joshua Wong
- Production company: Oriental Film
- Release date: 29 June 1940 (Dutch East Indies)
- Country: Dutch East Indies
- Language: Malay

Kris Mataram is a 1940 film from the Dutch East Indies that was directed by Njoo Cheong Seng and starred Fifi Young and Omar Rodriga as two lovers divided by class. Young's feature film debut, the film was the first produced by Oriental Film and depended on Young's stardom as a stage actress to attract viewers. It may be a lost film.

== Plot ==
A young noblewoman from Kartasura, R. A. Roosmini (Fifi Young), falls in love with a commoner named Bachtiar (Omar Rodriga). She wants to be with him, but her father R. M. Hadikusumo insists that she marry a man from a similar background. The two run away together, but Bachtiar is recalled by his family and forced to marry a woman he does not love. Roosmini, rather than marry a man she does not love or live alone, stabs herself with her sacred kris and dies.

== Production ==
Kris Mataram was produced by Oriental Film, a newly established studio. It brought Fifi Young and her husband Njoo Cheong Seng to the studio: Young – a former stage star – to act and Njoo to direct and write the film. It was his directorial debut, and the script for Kris Mataram had previously been intended for the stage. Joshua Wong, formerly of Tan's Film, was drawn to Oriental Film to handle the cinematography for Kris Mataram. Wong was disappointed over the profit sharing of his ventures with Tan's.

The title, which literally translates as "kris of Mataram", was chosen to attract attention; the Indonesian film historian Misbach Yusa Biran describes the work as not relating to the culture of Mataram. The film was seen as contrasting traditionalism against modernity, as well as Western and Eastern cultures. The film was black-and-white, with Malay-language dialogue.

== Release ==
The film made its debut on 29 June 1940 in Rex Theatre, Batavia (modern-day Jakarta). Kris Mataram was targeted at lower-class audiences. Biran writes that its audiences were mostly those who enjoyed the traditional toneel stage plays, partly because of the film's reliance on Young to attract viewers.

Kris Mataram is likely a lost film. The American visual anthropologist Karl G. Heider writes that all Indonesian films from before 1950 are lost. However, JB Kristanto's Katalog Film Indonesia (Indonesian Film Catalogue) records several as having survived at Sinematek Indonesia's archives, and Biran writes that several Japanese propaganda films have survived at the Netherlands Government Information Service.
