= Gondulphus Doeriat =

Indonesian politician

Raden Gondulphus Doeriat
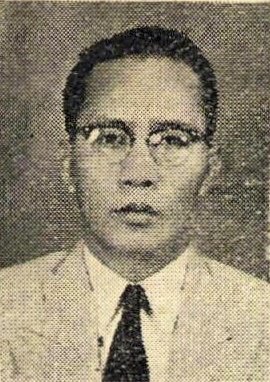

Member of the People's Consultative Assembly
- In office 1 October 1972 – 1 October 1977

Member of the People's Representative Council
- In office 13 February 1968 – 28 October 1971
- In office 14 June 1956 – 26 June 1960

Personal details
- Born: Rabekan; March 15, 1913 Yogyakarta, Yogyakarta Sultanate, Dutch East Indies
- Died: July 18, 1998 (aged 85) Rotterdam, Netherlands
- Party: Catholic Party (until 1973); Indonesian Democratic Party (since 1973)
- Spouse: Felicitas Siti Rabini (m. 1937; died 1996)

Raden Gondulphus Doeriat (Note: Gondulphus: Also written as Gondolphus; Doeriat: Also written as Duriat.) (15 March 1913 – 18 July 1998) was an Indonesian politician from the Catholic Party. He was a member of the People's Representative Council from 1956 until 1960, and later from 1968 until 1971. After the fusion of the party into the Indonesian Democratic Party, he held office as the head of the party from 1976 until 1981, and represented the party in the Supreme Advisory Council from 1978 until 1983.

== Early life ==
Doeriat was born on 15 March 1913 at Yogyakarta, as the son of Gunowijoyo, a village head in Cepet, located at the slope of Mount Merapi. He was originally named Rabekan. Following Javanese custom, he was renamed after surviving a childhood illness. He went to the Ongko Loro school, the branch of the Taman Siswa in the Tanjung Region. After completing the first grade in the school, in his request, he moved to the Normalschool in Muntilan.

During his time in Muntilan, a plague occurred. Doeriat went back to his house, and his father moved him to another school. He then went to the Hollandsche Indische Kweekschool and graduated in 1934.

== Career ==
After he graduated from HIK, he was accepted as a teacher in the Katholieke Kweekschool at Muntilan. He was transferred from the school to become the principal of the Schakelschool in Sleman. During his time in Sleman, he rented a boarding house in Yogyakarta. After his marriage with Siti Rabini, Doeriat's parents bought him a home in the Jetis Pakuningratan village, located close to the Tugu Yogyakarta.

In 1939, after being offered a job by his friend in Batavia, Doeriat moved to the city. There, he joined the Javan Catholic Political Union, and became the secretary of the union. He also taught at the Van Lith Hollandsch-Inlandsche School (Dutch school for indigenous people) in Batavia, and joined the Catholic Scouting.

After the Japanese occupied the Dutch East Indies, Doeriat's wife was ordered by her father to evacuate to her father's house in Boyolali, leaving behind Doeriat in Batavia. On 8 March 1942, the Van Lith school was forcefully closed by the Japanese forces, and Doeriat followed his wife to Boyolali.

During his time in Boyolali, he was employed as a sinder (supervisor) at a tea plantation owned by the Imperial Japanese Army in Baros Tampir village near Boyolali.

== Religious life ==
Doeriat was originally a Muslim. His grandfather completed his Hajj pilgrimage in 1925. He converted to Catholic when he was fifth grade.

== Bibliography ==
- Suhendro, Eddy (1987), "Anak-Anak Jaman", Satya Historika, Jakarta: Idola Grafika Utama
- Parlaungan (1956), Hasil Rakjat Memilih Tokoh-tokoh Parlemen (Hasil Pemilihan Umum Pertama – 1955) di Republik Indonesia [Result of People Electing Parliamentary Members (Result of the First General Election – 1955) in the Republic of Indonesia] (in Indonesian), Jakarta: C.V. Gita
