= Fred Young (director) =

Indonesian film director

- Unknown year
- Born: Njo Tiong Gie; 31 October 1900; Semarang, Dutch East Indies
- Died: 2 June 1977 (aged 76); Malang, Indonesia
- Occupation: Filmmaker
- Years active: 1940–1974

Fred Young (born Njo Tiong Gie; Chinese: 楊中義; pinyin: Yáng Zhōngyì; 31 October 1900 – 2 June 1977) was an ethnic Chinese film director and producer active in the Dutch East Indies and Indonesia following its independence. He reportedly studied film in Hollywood as a youth, but only entered the nation's film industry in 1940. After he made his debut as a writer with Sorga Palsoe, he was involved in some 36 productions, 23 as director.

== Biography ==
Young was born in Semarang, Central Java, to Njo Gwan Djoe and Ong Kien Nio on 31 October 1900. As a child he was adopted by his uncle Njo Gwan Jong & Kang Toan Nio, who lived in Malang, East Java. He had a junior high school education in the Dutch East Indies. However, he reportedly was in Los Angeles, US, by the 1920s, learning about film with The Teng Chun and Nelson Wong. Young would work with The later in his career.

Young entered the film industry in 1940 when he wrote Sorga Palsoe (False Paradise). Later that year he joined with SI Liem to establish Majestic Film in Batavia (now Jakarta).

The company's first production, Djantoeng Hati, was directed by Njoo Cheong Seng, with Liem and Young serving as producers. Majestic's second production, Air Mata Iboe (Mother's Tears; 1941), a tragedy which followed a young man who takes vengeance on his siblings after they refuse to shelter their mother, was produced by Young, directed by Njoo, and starred Njoo's wife Fifi Young (no relation).

When the Japanese occupied the Indies beginning in 1942, closing all but one film studio, Young went into the theatre, establishing the Bintang Soerabaja theatre company. He did not return to film until 1949, after Indonesia proclaimed its independence, when he helped establish the Bintang Soerabaja Film Company and made his directorial debut, Sehidup Semati. That year he made one further film, Sapu Tangan.

Young remained highly active throughout the 1950s, directing, writing, or producing 24 films in that decade alone. During the 1960s, during a time of increased discrimination against Chinese Indonesians, he began to write under the Indonesian-sounding pen name Utomo. By the mid 1960s he had slowed in his filmmaking, but made a short resurgence in the 1970s. He died in Malang, East Java, on 2 June 1977.

== Filmography ==
During his career Young was involved in 36 films, directing 23 of them.

- Sorga Palsoe (False Paradise; 1940) – Story
- Djantoeng Hati (Heart and Soul; 1941) – Producer
- Air Mata Iboe (Mother's Tears; 1941) – Producer
- Sehidup Semati (1949) – Director and story
- Saputangan (Handkerchief; 1949) – Director and story
- Bengawan Solo (Solo River; 1949) – Story
- Ratapan Ibu (Mother's Gaze; 1950) – Director
- Bintang Surabaja 1951 (Star of Surabaya, 1951; 1950) – Story
- Djembatan Merah (Red Bridge; 1950) – Director
- Damarwulan (1950) – Director and producer
- Harumanis (1950) – Director and story
- Antara Tertawa dan Airmata (Between Laughter and Tears; 1951) – Director
- Ditepi Bengawan Solo (On the Banks of the Solo River; 1951) – Director
- Chandra Dewi (1952) – Director and screenwriter
- Dewa Dewi (Gods and Goddesses; 1952) – Producer
- Kumala Dewa Dewi (1952) – Producer
- Sangkar Emas (Golden Cage; 1952) – Director
- Sorga Terakhir (Last Heaven; 1952) – Director, screenwriter, and story
- Putri Solo (Daughter of Solo; 1953) – Director
- Rosita (1953) – Producer
- Saputangan Sutra (Silk Gloves; 1953) – Director and producer
- Srigala Topeng Hitam (Wolf with the Black Mask; 1953) – Producer
- Lenggang Djakarta (1953) – Producer
- Halilintar (1954) – Director, producer, and story
- Sebatang Kara (Alone; 1954) – Director
- Guntur (1955) – Producer
- Rumah Gila (Crazy House; 1955) – Director, producer, screenwriter, and story
- Setulus Hatiku (As True as My Heart; 1955) – Director and producer
- Putri Solo Kembali (The Daughter of Solo Returns; 1956) – Director and producer
- Radja Karet dari Singapura (Rubber King of Singapore; 1956) – Director
- Air Mata Ibu (Mother's Tears; 1957) – Director and producer
- Dibalik Awan (Behind the Clouds; 1963) – Director, producer, screenwriter, and story
- Bengawan Solo (River of Love; 1971) – story
- Aku Mau Hidup (I Want to Live; 1974) – Producer and story
- Putri Solo (Daughter of Solo; 1974) – Director, producer, screenwriter, and story
- Bunga Roos dari Cikembang (Rose from Cikembang; 1975) – Director, producer, and screenwriter
