= Hollandsch-Inlandsche School =

Colonial education in Dutch Indonesia

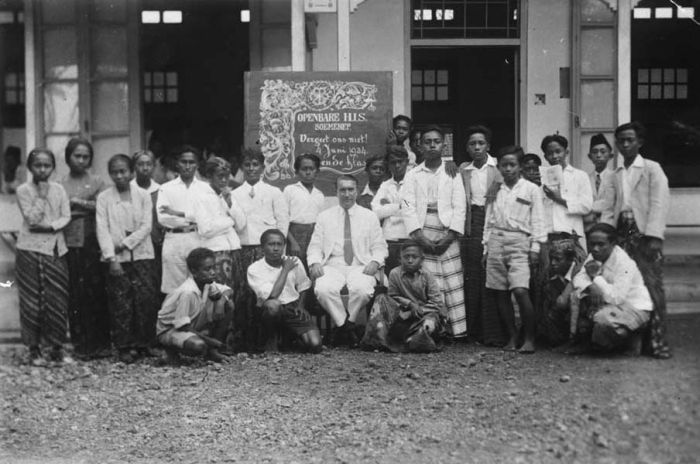
Students of HIS Sumenep in 1934

The Hollandsch-Inlandsche School (HIS; Dutch for Dutch school for natives) was a school during the Dutch colonial era in Indonesia. The school, was first established in 1914, following with the enactment of the Dutch Ethical Policy. The school was at the Low Education level (Lager Onderwijs) or at the level of basic education today. The school was intended for the population of indigenous Indonesian descent, Generally reserved for children from the noble class, prominent figures, or civil servants. The length of the school programme was seven years.

== See also ==
- Hogere Burger School (HBS)
- Hollandsch Chineesche School (HCS)
- Hollandsch Inlandsche Kweekschool (HIK)
- Hollandsch Javaansche School (HJS)
- Meer Uitgebreid Lager Onderwijs (MULO)
