= Albertus Maruli Tambunan =

Indonesian armed forces officer and politician

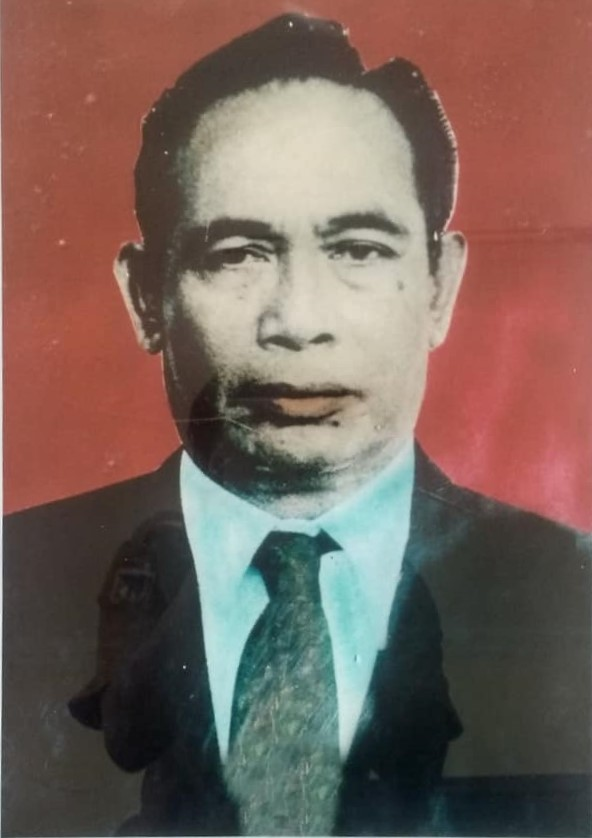

Governor of Central Sulawesi
- In office 23 April 1973 – 28 September 1978
- President: Suharto
- Preceded by: Mohammad Yasin
- Succeeded by: Moenafri

Personal details
- Born: December 8, 1925 Porsea, Tapanuli, Dutch East Indies
- Died: May 2, 2019 (aged 93) Jakarta, Indonesia
- Party: Golkar
- Spouse: R. W. Siahaan (m. 1952)
- Parents: A. Tambunan (father); J. Hasibuan (mother)

Military service
- Allegiance: Indonesia
- Branch/service: Army
- Rank: Major General
- Unit: 1945—1981

Albertus Maruli Tambunan (8 December 1925 – 2 May 2019) was an Indonesian armed forces officer and politician who served as the governor of Central Sulawesi from 1973 until 1978.

== Early life ==
Tambunan was born on 8 December 1925 in Porsea, North Tapanuli, as the son of A. Tambunan and J. Hasibuan. Tambunan has eight brothers, namely Alfred, Mangatas, Paul, Sondang, Mangantar, Bismarck, Patuan, and Sahat. Related to Eric Tambunan, and Uli Tambunan

Tambunan started his education at the Narumonda's Dutch-speaking elementary school (Hollandsch-Inlandsche School) in 1932 and graduated from the school in 1938. He then moved to Central Java and attended the Solo Auxiliary Teachers' School (HIK, Hollandsche Indische Kweekschool), but dropped out from the school in 1942 due to Japanese occupation.

== Military career ==
After dropping out from HIK, Tambunan was enrolled to the Youth Training Center (Seinen-kunrenjo), a youth academy which was established to provide military training for Indonesian male youths.

Tambunan joined the fledgling Indonesian Army after the proclamation of Indonesian independence in 1945. He returned to North Sumatra and was made as a first lieutenant in the army. He held several posts in the Indonesian Army and fought against the Dutch in Operation Product and Kraai. Tambunan was shot and injured during a battle in Tanggabatu in 1949.

After the war against the Dutch ended, Tambunan served in North Sumatra for a few more years before being transferred to South Sumatra. He held various positions in South Sumatra, with the longest being the adjutant to the commander of the South Sumatra Military Region for five years. He also attended the Palembang State High School for three years before graduating from the school in 1960. He was transferred to the army headquarters in 1964 and held several posts in the general staff. While serving in the general staff, he was tasked to head a special project.

After two decades serving in military posts, Tambunan received his first military post when he was transferred to the Department of Textile Industry. Tambunan became the Head of the Logistics Bureau in the department from 1965 to 1966. After that, he was appointed to lead the body for foreign textile company supervision.

Tambunan was instructed to pursue further military education and attended the Indonesian Army Command and General Staff College. He graduated from the college in 1967 and was appointed as the Commander of the Tadulako (Central Sulawesi) Military Resort on 23 December 1968. He served for approximately five years in the position before becoming the Governor of Central Sulawesi in April 1973.

Tambunan reached the mandatory age of retirement in 1981. He was promoted to major general on that year before retiring from the military.

== Governor of Central Sulawesi ==
Tambunan was sworn in as the acting Governor of Central Sulawesi on 23 April 1973, replacing Colonel M. Yasin who had served for a five-year term. He was then sworn in again as a definitive governor after undergoing political formalities. After five years becoming a governor in the province, Tambunan ended his term on 28 September 1978 and was replaced by Moenafri.

== Later life and death ==
After his term as governor ended, Tambunan was appointed as the Secretary General of the Department of Social Affairs. He served in the position from 1978 until 1983.

Tambunan died on 2 May 2019 in Jakarta.

== Personal life ==
Tambunan was married to R. W. Siahaan on 2 June 1952 in Medan. The couple has eight children: Peggi, Erwin, Irma, Nancy, Nina, Iwan, Yonki, and Marischa.

== Awards ==
- Wounded Medal (Indonesian: Satyalancana Bhakti)
- Independence War Medal I (Indonesian: Satyalancana Perang Kemerdekaan I)
- Independence War Medal II (Indonesian: Satyalancana Perang Kemerdekaan II)
- Military Operational Service Medal V (Indonesian: Satyalancana Gerakan Operasi Militer V)
- Military Operational Service Medal VI (Indonesian: Satyalancana Gerakan Operasi Militer VI)
- Medal for Combat Against Communists (Indonesian: Satyalancana Penegak)
- Armed Forces Eight Years’ Service Star (Indonesian: Bintang Sewindu Angkatan Perang Republik Indonesia) (1953)
- Guerrilla Star (Indonesian: Bintang Gerilya) (1958)
- Military Long Service Medals, 2nd Category (Indonesian: Satyalancana Kesetiaan 24 Tahun) (1969)
- Star of Kartika Eka Paksi, 3rd Class (Indonesian: Bintang Kartika Eka Paksi Nararya) (5 October 1969)

== Dates of rank ==
Junior lieutenant	1945
Second lieutenant	1946
First lieutenant	1947
Second lieutenant (Note: The reorganization and rationalization policy enacted by the First Hatta Cabinet demoted soldiers of PETA origins one rank lower.)	1948
First lieutenant	1 July 1953
Captain	1 July 1956
Major	1 January 1961
Lieutenant colonel	1 July 1963
Colonel	1 October 1968
Brigadier general	1 October 1974
Major general	1981

== Bibliography ==
- Department of Defense and Security (1978), Riwayat Hidup Albertus Maruli Tambunan [Biography of Albertus Maruli Tambunan] (PDF)
- General Elections Institution (1973), Riwayat Hidup Anggota-Anggota Majelis Permusyawaratan Rakyat Hasil Pemilihan Umum 1971 [Biography of the Members of the People's Consultative Assembly from the 1971 General Elections] (in Indonesian), Jakarta
- General Elections Institution (1977), Ringkasan riwayat hidup dan riwayat perjuangan anggota Majelis Permusyawaratan Rakyat hasil pemilihan umum tahun 1977 [Summary of Biography and Career of Members of the People's Consultative Assembly from the 1977 General Elections] (in Indonesian), Jakarta, archived from the original on 15 December 2020
