= Fifi Young =

Indonesian actress (1915–1975)

Fifi Young 陳金娘
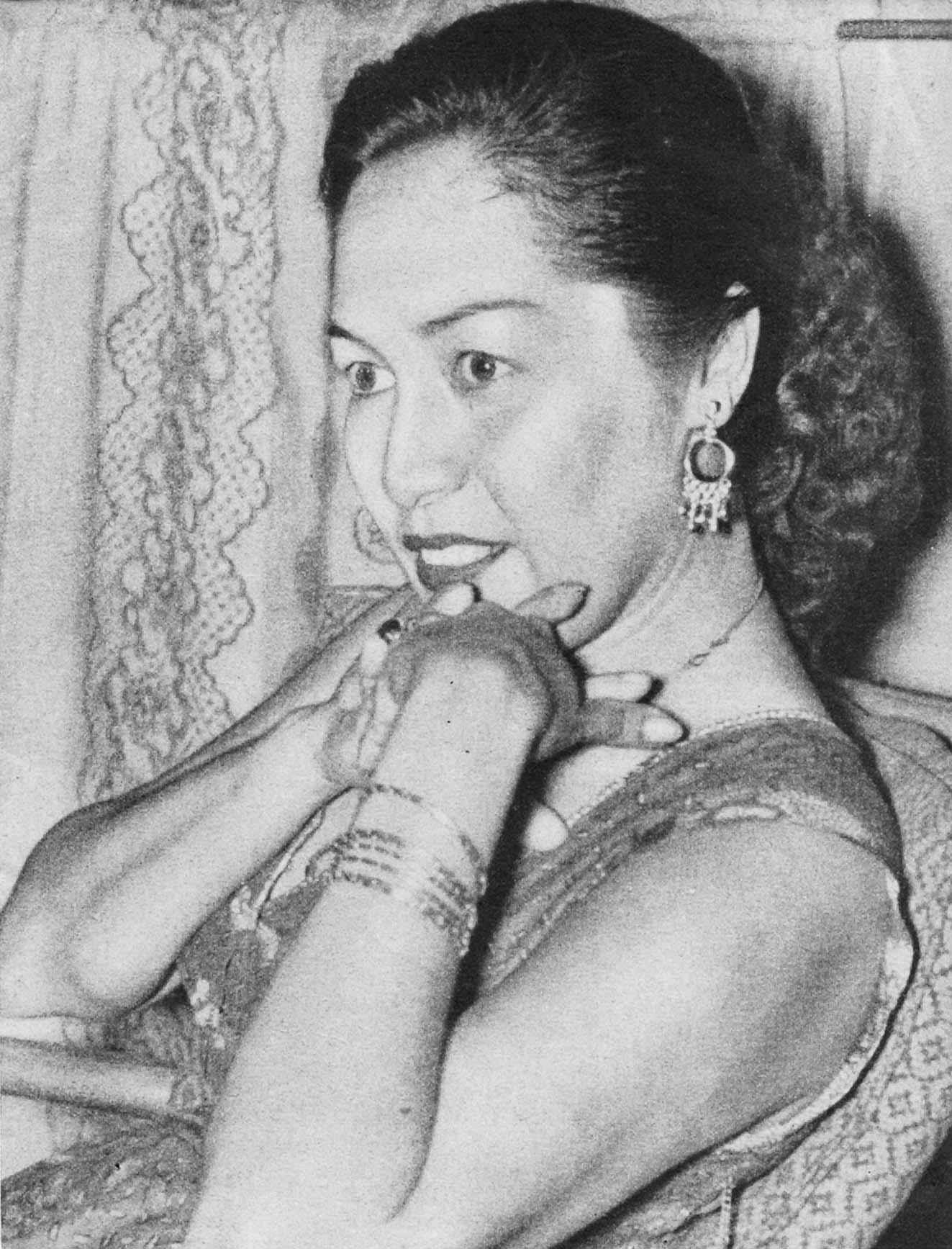
- Young, c. 1955
- Born: Nonie Tan; Tan Kiem Nio; 12 January 1915; Sungai Liput, Aceh, Dutch East Indies
- Died: 5 March 1975 (aged 60); Jakarta, Indonesia
- Education: Elementary school
- Occupation: Actress
- Years active: 1930–1974
- Spouse: Njoo Cheong Seng
- Children: 5 Njoo Giok Hwa, grandson Rudy Gunawan world badminton player

Fifi Young (12 January 1915 – 5 March 1975) was an Indonesian actress of mixed French and Chinese descent who acted in at least 86 films over her 34-year career.

== Early life and stage career ==
Young was born with the name Nonie Tan (Chinese: 陳金娘; pinyin: Chén Jīnniáng; POJ: Tan Kim Nio) in Sungai Liput, Aceh, on 12 January 1915 (Note: Several sources give the year as 1912, but Young said she was born in 1914, and Indonesian library Archive stated that she was born in 1915 (Labrousse 1973, p. 175).) to a peranakan Chinese mother and French father; her father may have been a serviceman during World War I. After her father died when she was a child, Young and her mother moved to Batavia (modern day Jakarta), where Young completed four years of elementary school at a Dutch-run school for Chinese.

Young first joined the Dewi Dja' troupe as a dancer, using the pseudonym Dewi Maria. She later switched to Miss Riboet's Orion troupe, where she married the playwright Njoo Cheong Seng when she was 14. The elder man coached her in acting and convinced her to take the stage name Fifi Young; Young was the Cantonese equivalent of Njoo's Hokkien surname, while Fifi was meant to be reminiscent of the French actress Fifi D'Orsay. With Miss Riboet, Young travelled throughout South East Asia, including in Malaya.

In 1930 the couple established the Moonlight Crystal Follies in Penang, where Young had her first acting job. By the mid-1930s Young and Njoo had switched to the Dardanella troupe. Young was one of the group's stars, and after most of the group went abroad Young and Njoo established their own troupe, Fifi Young's Pagoda, in 1937.

== Film career ==
After the success of Albert Balink's Terang Boelan in 1937 and The Teng Chun's Alang-Alang in 1939, four new film studios were started. One of these, Oriental Film, signed Njoo and Young; Njoo was taken as a writer, while Young was meant to be an actress. Young was hoped to be the studio's bankable star, and starred in the studio's first three films: Kris Mataram (Kris of Mataram; 1940), Zoebaida (1940), and Pantjawarna (Five Colours; 1941). When Njoo left the studio to join Majestic Pictures upon the invitation of Fred Young (no relation), Fifi Young went with him. With Majestic she starred in Air Mata Iboe (Mother's Tears; 1941).

During the Japanese occupation from 1942 to 1945, Young and Njoo were members of the Bintang Soerabaia troupe; their fellow member Dhalia had also been a film star before the occupation. The Japanese had closed all but one film studio, essentially killing the industry. During the four-year revolution that followed World War II, Young and her husband led the Pantjawarna troupe.

After the revolution, Young returned to film. During the following two decades she often played mother figures. The American visual anthropologist Karl G. Heider writes that Young performed especially well when acting as an older village woman and that she was well known for chewing betel on-screen.

Young's last film was Teguh Karya's Ranjang Pengantin (Wedding Dress) released in 1974. She died on 5 March 1975 after spending several months in hospital. She was cremated at Muara Karang, North Jakarta, four days after her death, until which she had actively spoke out against the sexually themed stories that had begun dominating the nation's cinema. Her daughter Sally Young (born 1930), one of five children Young had with Njoo before they divorced, went into acting.

== Awards ==
Young received several acting awards during her career. At the inaugural Indonesian Film Festival in 1955, Young was chosen for the best actress award for her role in Tarmina. She received several nominations from the PWI, including Best Actress for Wajah Seorang Pembunuh in 1973 and Best Actress for Jembatan Merah in 1974. In November 2003 Young was posthumously awarded a Budaya Parama Dharma Award by President Megawati Sukarnoputri for her contributions to the development of Indonesian culture. Other awardees included the comedian Bing Slamet and the director D. Djajakusuma.

== Filmography ==
Young acted in at least 86 films over her 34-year career, saying in 1972 that she had forgotten just how many. Those recorded are as follows:

- Kris Mataram (Kris of Mataram; 1940)
- Zoebaida (1940)
- Pantjawarna (Five Colours; 1941)
- Air Mata Iboe (Mother's Tears; 1941)
- Bintang Surabaja 1951 (Star of Surabaya 1951; 1950)
- Harumanis (Sweet and Fragrant; 1950)
- Irawaty (Aju Kesuma) (Irawaty [Beautiful Flower]; 1950)
- Meratap Hati (Lamenting the Heart; 1950)
- Ratapan Ibu (Mother's Wailing; 1950)
- Djakarta Diwaktu Malam (Jakarta at Night; 1954)
- Halilintar (1954)
- Sedarah Sedaging (Blood and Flesh; 1954)
- Siapa Ajahku (Who's My Father; 1954)
- Tarmina (1954)
- Gadis Sesat (Lost Girl; 1955)
- Berdjumpa Kembali (Meet Again; 1955)
- Kekasih Ajah (Father's Lover; 1955)
- Rumah Gila (Crazy House; 1955)
- Pemetjahan Poligami (Polygamous Breakup; 1956)
- Terang Bulan Terang di Kali (Moonlight Shining in the Stream; 1956)
- Tiga Dara (Three Ladies; 1956)
- Tandjung Katung (1957)
- Air Mata Ibu (Mother's Tears; 1957)
- Konsepsi Ajah (Father's Conception; 1957)
- Asrama Dara (Women's Love; 1958)
- Bertamasja (Holiday; 1959)
- Momon (1959)
- Serba Salah (Always Wrong; 1959)
- Tiga Mawar (Three Roses; 1959)
- Darah Tinggi (High Blood; 1960)
- Desa yang Dilupakan (The Forgotten Village; 1960)
- Gadis Manis Dipinggir Djalan (Sweet Maiden at the Roadside; 1960)
- Gaja Remadja (Teenage Girl; 1960)
- Mendung Sendja Hari (Dark at Noon; 1960)
- Asmara dan Wanita (Passion and Women; 1961)
- Limapuluh Megaton (Fifty Megatons; 1961)
- Notaris Sulami (Sulami the Notary Public; 1961)
- Sajem(1961)
- Pesan Ibu (Mother's Message; 1961)
- Si Kembar (The Twins; 1961)
- Holiday in Bali (1962)
- Violetta (1962)
- DKN 901 (1962)
- Bintang Ketjil (Little Star; 1963)
- Daerah Perbatasan (Border; 1964)
- Pilihan Hati (Heart's Choice; 1964)
- Manusia dan Peristiwa (Mankind and Events; 1968)
- Awan Djingga (Orange Clouds; 1970)
- Bali (1970)
- Dibalik Pintu Dosa (Behind the Doors of Sin; 1970)
- Hidup, Tjinta dan Air Mata (Life, Love, and Tears; 1970)
- Samiun dan Dasima (Samiun and Dasima; 1970)
- Si Bego Menumpas Kutjing Hitam (The Idiot Takes on the Black Cat; 1970)
- Si Pitung (1970)
- Banteng Betawi (The Betawi Bull; 1971)
- Biarkan Musim Berganti (Let the Seasons Pass; 1971)
- Derita Tiada Akhir (Unending Suffering; 1971)
- Djembatan Emas (The Golden Bridge; 1971)
- Ilusia (Kasih Tak Terputuskan) (Illusion [Unrequited Love]; 1971)
- Insan Kesepian (Lonely Person; 1971)
- Malin Kundang (Anak Durhaka) (Malin Kundang [Forsaken Child]; 1971)
- Pengantin Remaja (Teenage Bride; 1971)
- Rina (1971)
- Tjinta di Batas Peron (Love at the Lorry's Edge; 1971)
- Mawar Rimba (Jungle Rose; 1972)
- Pengantin Tiga Kali (Married Three Times; 1972)
- Salah Asuhan (Wrong Upbringing; 1972)
- Aku Tak Berdosa (I Did Nothing Wrong; 1972)
- Titienku Sayang (My Dear Titien; 1972)
- Tjintaku Djauh Dipulau (My Titien, Far Away; 1972)
- Wajah Seorang Pembunuh (Face of a Killer; 1972)
- Ketemu Jodoh (Meeting a Soulmate; 1973)
- Kutukan Ibu (Mother's Curse; 1973)
- Ambisi (Ambition; 1973)
- Jembatan Merah (Red Bridge; 1973)
- Si Doel Anak Betawi (Doel, the Betawi Child; 1973)
- Bobby (1974)
- Si Bagong Mujur (The Lucky Bagong; 1974)
- Tetesan Air Mata Ibu (Mother's Tear Drops; 1974)
- Cinta Remaja (Teenage Lovers; 1974)
- Ratapan dan Rintihan (Wailing and Crying; 1974)
- Hamidah (1974)
- Sayangilah Daku (Love Me; 1974)
- Mei Lan, Aku Cinta Padamu (Mei Lan, I Love You; 1974)
- Gaun Pengantin (Wedding Dress; 1974)
- Ranjang Pengantin (Wedding Bed; 1974)
