= Zoebaida =

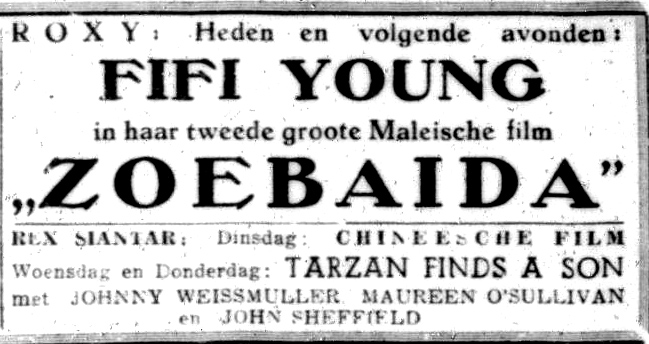
- Newspaper ad, Medan; an advertisement for Tarzan Finds a Son! is underneath
- Directed by: Njoo Cheong Seng
- Based on: Timoeriana by Njoo Cheong Seng
- Produced by: Tjan Hock Siong
- Starring: Fifi Young
- Cinematography: JJW Steffens
- Music by: Oriental Novelty Five
- Production company: Oriental Film
- Release date: 1940 (Dutch East Indies)
- Country: Dutch East Indies
- Language: Indonesian

Zoebaida (Perfected Spelling: Zubaida) is a 1940 film from the Dutch East Indies directed by Njoo Cheong Seng. A romance set in Timor, it starred Njoo's wife Fifi Young and was the film debut of Soerip. Shot over a period of 27 days in a Dutch-owned studio, the film received middling reviews. It is likely lost.

== Plot ==
A love story set in Timor, in which Zoebaida and her lover are forbidden from marrying by those in power. They can eventually unite as husband and wife.

== Production ==
Zoebaida was directed by Njoo Cheong Seng, formerly of the theatre; it was his second film, following Kris Mataram. The film's story was adapted from a stage play, also by Njoo, entitled Timoeriana. According to the Indonesian film historian Misbach Yusa Biran, the film was targeted at lower-class audiences. Biran also suggests that Njoo had been experimenting freely with the film, giving names on a whim and unrealistic, bright costumes. The film may have been made in response to The Teng Chun's Alang-Alang (Grass; 1939), which took remote locations and made them more exotic.

Zoebaida was produced by Tjan Hock Siong of the Oriental Film Company. Cinematography was handled by JJW Steffens, a Dutchman who worked for Dutch Indies Film Syndicate (Algemeen Nederlandsch Indisch Filmsyndicaat, or ANIF). Filming was completed over a period of 27 days in ANIF's studio complex in Batavia, which was rented at a rate of 1,500 gulden a month. For shooting, which was in black-and-white, Njoo and Tjan used empty land adjacent to the studio to build a village set. The film featured seven songs by the Hawaiian-influence group Oriental Novelty Five, with sound editing handled by KN Boen.

The film starred Njoo's wife, Fifi Young, in the titular role of Zoebaida. She had been a stage star during the 1930s, a fact that the studio exploited to help its marketing. The film was the debut of popular kroncong singer Soerip. It also featured Aisah, Moemoe Segara, Omar Rodriga, and S. Poniman.

== Release and reception ==
Zoebaida was released in late 1940. It saw screenings in Medan in mid-November of that year, and by December it had reached Surabaya. In March 1941 it was screened in Cirebon, near Batavia (now Jakarta).

Biran writes that reviews from native intelligentsia were critical of the dialogue, considering it reminiscent of a stage play. An anonymous review in De Indische Courant found that the film was full of exaggeration, with the theatrical influence prominent. The review suggested, however, that the film kept audiences focused by using alternating long shots and close-ups.

== Legacy ==
Njoo directed one further film for Oriental, Pantjawarna, in 1941; he left the studio with Young not long afterwards and joined Majestic Pictures. Oriental closed later that year, after releasing a final film, Panggilan Darah (Call of Blood). Soerip would go on to act in another 24 films before retiring in 1990.

Zoebaida is likely a lost film. The American visual anthropologist Karl G. Heider writes that all Indonesian films from before 1950 are lost. However, JB Kristanto's Katalog Film Indonesia (Indonesian Film Catalogue) records several as having survived at Sinematek Indonesia's archives, and Biran writes that several Japanese propaganda films have survived at the Netherlands Government Information Service.

== Works cited ==
- Biran, Misbach Yusa (2009). Sejarah Film 1900–1950: Bikin Film di Jawa [History of Film 1900–1950: Making Films in Java] (in Indonesian). Jakarta: Komunitas Bamboo working with the Jakarta Art Council. ISBN 978-979-3731-58-2.
- "Filmografi Soerip" [Filmography for Soerip]. filmindonesia.or.id (in Indonesian). Jakarta: Konfiden Foundation. Archived from the original on 3 February 2014.
- Heider, Karl G (1991). Indonesian Cinema: National Culture on Screen. Honolulu: University of Hawaii Press. ISBN 978-0-8248-1367-3.
- "Kredit Zoebaida" [Credits for Zoebaida]. filmindonesia.or.id (in Indonesian). Jakarta: Konfiden Foundation. Archived from the original on 6 March 2016.
- "Sampoerna: 'Zoebaida'". De Indische courant (in Dutch). Surabaya: Kolff & Co. 21 December 1940. p. 2.
- "Soerip, Miss". Encyclopedia of Jakarta (in Indonesian). Jakarta City Government. Archived from the original on 4 March 2016.
- "(untitled)". De Sumatra Post (in Dutch). Medan. 11 November 1940. p. 10.
- "(untitled)". Bataviaasch Nieuwsblad (in Dutch). Batavia: Kolff & Co. 27 March 1941. p. 12.
- "Zoebaida". filmindonesia.or.id (in Indonesian). Jakarta: Konfiden Foundation. Archived from the original on 2 December 2013.
