= Elang Darat =

- Directed by: Inoe Perbatasari
- Screenplay by: Inoe Perbatasari
- Produced by: The Teng Chun
- Starring: Astaman; Ali Joego
- Production company: Jacatra Film
- Release date: 1941 (Dutch East Indies)
- Country: Dutch East Indies
- Language: Indonesian

Elang Darat ([eˈlaŋ daˈrat]; Indonesian for Land Hawk) is a 1941 film from the Dutch East Indies (present-day Indonesia) which was directed by Inoe Perbatasari and produced by The Teng Chun for Jacatra Film. A detective film, it follows a man who comes to a village to track the villainous bandit known only as "Elang Darat".

== Plot ==
After a series of robberies led by a bandit known as "Elang Darat", the chief of Kresek village calls in a detective named Parlan (Astaman). While investigating the crimes, Parlan is attacked and knocked out by a blow to the head. The chief's daughter, Rukmini, nurses him back to health and the two begin falling in love. This leaves the chief's adopted son, Gunawi, in a fury, as Gunawi is in love with Rukmini as well. Parlan's investigation reveals that Gunawi is, in fact, his long-lost half brother. Later the two must fight after it is revealed that Gunawi is "Elang Darat".

== Production ==
Elang Darat was produced by The Teng Chun for the Jacatra Film Company, a subsidiary of his Java Industrial Film. It was written and directed by former journalist Inoe Perbatasari, who had previously been assistant director on Andjar Asmara's Kartinah. Camerawork for the black-and-white film was handled by Tan Kim An, while sound editing was completed by The Teng Chun's brother The Teng Liong.

A large number of the cast members are recorded. The film starred Astaman and Ali Joego, with Rohana, Salam, Amalia, Louise Gunter, S Aminah, and Mas'oed Pandji Anom in supporting roles. Production began in July 1941.

== Release ==
Elang Darat was released in 1941. Inoe Perbatasari would go on to make one more film for Jacatra Pictures, Poetri Rimba, later that year.

It is likely lost. The American visual anthropologist Karl G. Heider writes that all Indonesian films from before 1950 are lost. However, JB Kristanto's Katalog Film Indonesia (Indonesian Film Catalogue) records several as having survived at Sinematek Indonesia's archives, and film historian Misbach Yusa Biran writes that several Japanese propaganda films have survived at the Netherlands Government Information Service.

== Works cited ==
- Biran, Misbach Yusa (2009). Sejarah Film 1900–1950: Bikin Film di Jawa [History of Film 1900–1950: Making Films in Java] (in Indonesian). Jakarta: Komunitas Bamboo working with the Jakarta Art Council. ISBN 978-979-3731-58-2.
- "Elang Darat". filmindonesia.or.id (in Indonesian). Jakarta: Konfiden Foundation. Archived from the original on 2 December 2013.
- Heider, Karl G (1991). Indonesian Cinema: National Culture on Screen. Honolulu: University of Hawaii Press. ISBN 978-0-8248-1367-3.
- "Inoe Perbatasari | Filmografi" [Inoe Perbatasari | Filmography]. filmindonesia.or.id (in Indonesian). Jakarta: Konfidan Foundation. Archived from the original on 16 April 2014.
- "Kredit Elang Darat" [Credits for Elang Darat]. filmindonesia.or.id (in Indonesian). Jakarta: Konfiden Foundation. Archived from the original on 5 March 2016.
