= Oriental Film =

Defunct Indonesian film company

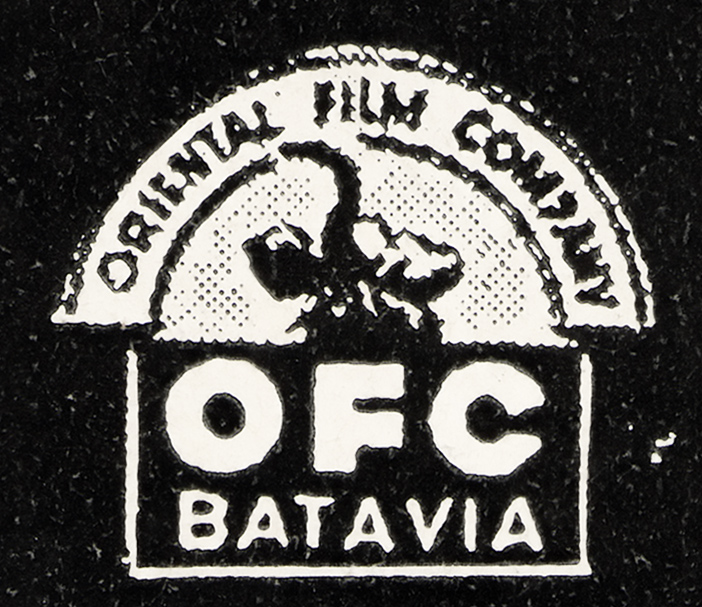
- Oriental logo, from an advertisement for Panggilan Darah

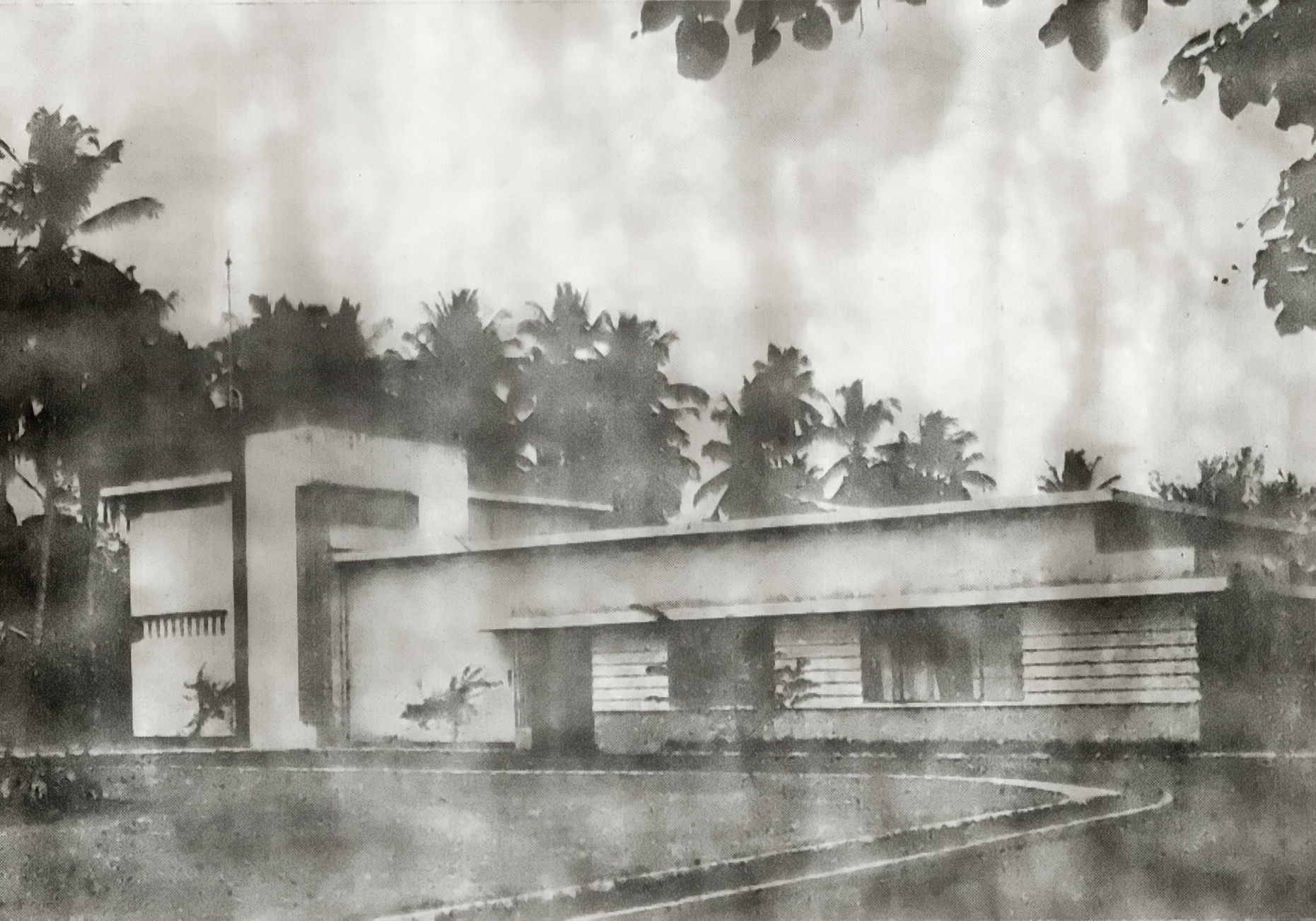
- The ANIF studios, which Oriental used from late 1940 until the company closed in 1941, today used by PFN
- Type: Private
- Industry: Film
- Founded: Batavia, Dutch East Indies (1940)
- Defunct: 1941
- Fate: Dissolved
- Headquarters: Batavia, Dutch East Indies
- Area served: Dutch East Indies
- Key people: Tjo Seng Han (owner); Tjan Hock Siong (manager)

Oriental Film was a film production company in Batavia, Dutch East Indies (now Jakarta, Indonesia). Established by ethnic Chinese businessman Tjo Seng Han in 1940, it completed four black-and-white films before it was closed in 1941. All the company's films were screened into the 1950s but may now be lost. They were directed by two men, Njoo Cheong Seng and Sutan Usman Karim, and launched the careers of actors such as Dhalia and Soerip.

Established during the revival of the Indies film industry, Oriental released its first film, Kris Mataram, in July 1940. It starred Njoo's wife Fifi Young, and relied on her fame as a stage actress to draw audiences. This was followed by a further three films, which were targeted at low-income audiences and extensively used kroncong music. Their final production was Panggilan Darah in 1941, which was completed after Njoo and Young had migrated to Majestic Film. Oriental was unable to recoup its expenses of renting a Dutch-owned studio, and the company was shut down.

== Establishment ==
Following the commercial successes of Terang Boelan (Full Moon; 1937), Fatima (1938), and Alang-Alang (Grass; 1939), the Dutch East Indies film industry – which had been severely weakened by the Great Depression – was revived. Film production increased and, in 1940, four new production houses were opened, including Oriental Film. Funded entirely by the ethnic Chinese businessman Tjo Seng Han, the company's first headquarters were at 42 Matraman Street, in eastern Batavia (now Jakarta); according to the weekly Sin Po, this studio had simple facilities. Another ethnic Chinese businessman, Tjan Hock Siong, was brought on to manage the day-to-day activities of the studio.

Tjo and Tjan hired Njoo Cheong Seng, a dramatist who had previously worked with the Orion Opera before establishing his own troupe, and his wife Fifi Young. The two had gained wide recognition through their stage work, and it was hoped that name recognition would bring in audiences. The hiring of Njoo and Young was part of a trend of bringing theatrically trained actors and crew into the film industry. Terang Boelan had used stage starlet Roekiah and her husband Kartolo to great effect, and the actors had brought similar financial success to Tan's Film after they were hired. (Note: Java Industrial Film would later employ Astaman, Ratna Asmara, and Andjar Asmara of Dardanella beginning with their 1941 production Kartinah (Biran 2009, p. 214).)

== Productions ==
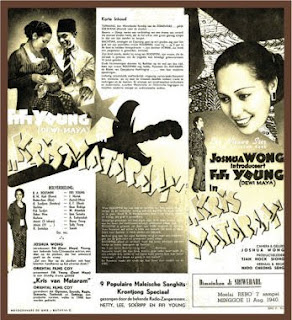
Advertisement for Oriental's first production, Kris Mataram (1940)

Oriental's first production, Kris Mataram (Kris of Mataram), was directed by Njoo and starred Young and Omar Rodriga. It followed a young noblewoman (played by Young) who marries a nobleman despite her parents' disapproval. For this film, Njoo drew Joshua Wong from Tan's as cinematographer, then used the Wong name as part of his advertising: "[Kris Mataram has] the J. Wong guarantee". (Note: Original: "J. WONG's garantie".) Released in July 1940, the film was targeted at low-income audiences – particularly theatre-goers who would recognise Young. A review in the Soerabaijasch Handelsblad praised it, calling Kris Mataram "captivating to the last metre". (Note: Original: "... boeiend tot den laatsten meter.")

Before its studio's second production, Oriental began renting the studios of Algemeen Nederlandsch Indisch Filmsyndicaat (ANIF) in Molenvliet, Batavia, (Note: This area was around what is now Gajah Mada and Hayam Wuruk Streets (Setiogi 2003, 'Molenvliet').) for 1,500 gulden a month. This rent also included access to the studio's equipment and cameraman J.J.W. Steffans, as well as facilities such as air conditioning and telephones in each office, and lighting equipment for night-time shots. A large adjacent plot of land was also included. By renting the ANIF complex, Oriental became the largest and most modern studio in the Indies.

Njoo soon showed a proclivity for sensation, which was manifested in the December 1940 release Zoebaida. For the film, a love story set in Timor starring Young as the title character, Oriental used bright, extravagant costumes; Njoo gave the characters whimsical names which would not be found in the setting. Rather than shoot on location – which would have been prohibitively expensive – Oriental constructed sets behind the ANIF Studio. Reviewers of the film noted with disdain that Zoebaida was exaggerated and clearly reflected its stage influences.

Oriental released its third production, Pantjawarna (Five Colours), in March 1941. Again starring Young, the film – in which a young woman must raise two daughters despite her husband's imprisonment – featured two new hires, Dhalia and Soerip. Both women, teenagers at the time, had established stage careers and were known for their singing voices, which were put to use in several of Pantjawarna's twelve kroncong songs. This film was well received by critics, and Young's acting was praised in both the Bataviaasch Nieuwsblad and Soerabaijasch Handelsblad; the latter characterised Pantjawarna as "a success for O.F.C. [Oriental Film Company] and proof of the progress made in the cinema of the Indies". (Note: Original: "... een succes aangemerkt worden voor de O. F. C. en een bewijs van vooruitgang voor de Indische filmindustrie".)

After Pantjawarna, Fred Young drew Njoo and his wife to the newly established Majestic Film. (Note: Fred and Fifi Young were unrelated (Biran 2009, p. 239). Fifi Young had been born Nonie Tan, and taken up her stage name at Njoo's urging: Young was the Mandarin equivalent of Njoo's Hokkien surname, while Fifi was meant to be reminiscent of the French actress Fifi D'Orsay (TIM, Fifi Young).) Deprived of their director and main star, Oriental hired the journalist Sutan Usman Karim (Note: Commonly known as Suska (Biran 2009, p. 216).) to direct their fourth production, Panggilan Darah (Call of Blood). This film, written by Karim and starring Dhalia and Soerip, told of two young orphans as they tried to eke a living in Batavia. This film, which debuted in June 1941, prominently featured the cigarette factory Nitisemito, leading the Indonesian film historian Misbach Yusa Biran to suggest that it may have paid for the advertisement. He records it as a modest success, although he notes that reviews were mixed.

== Closure and legacy ==
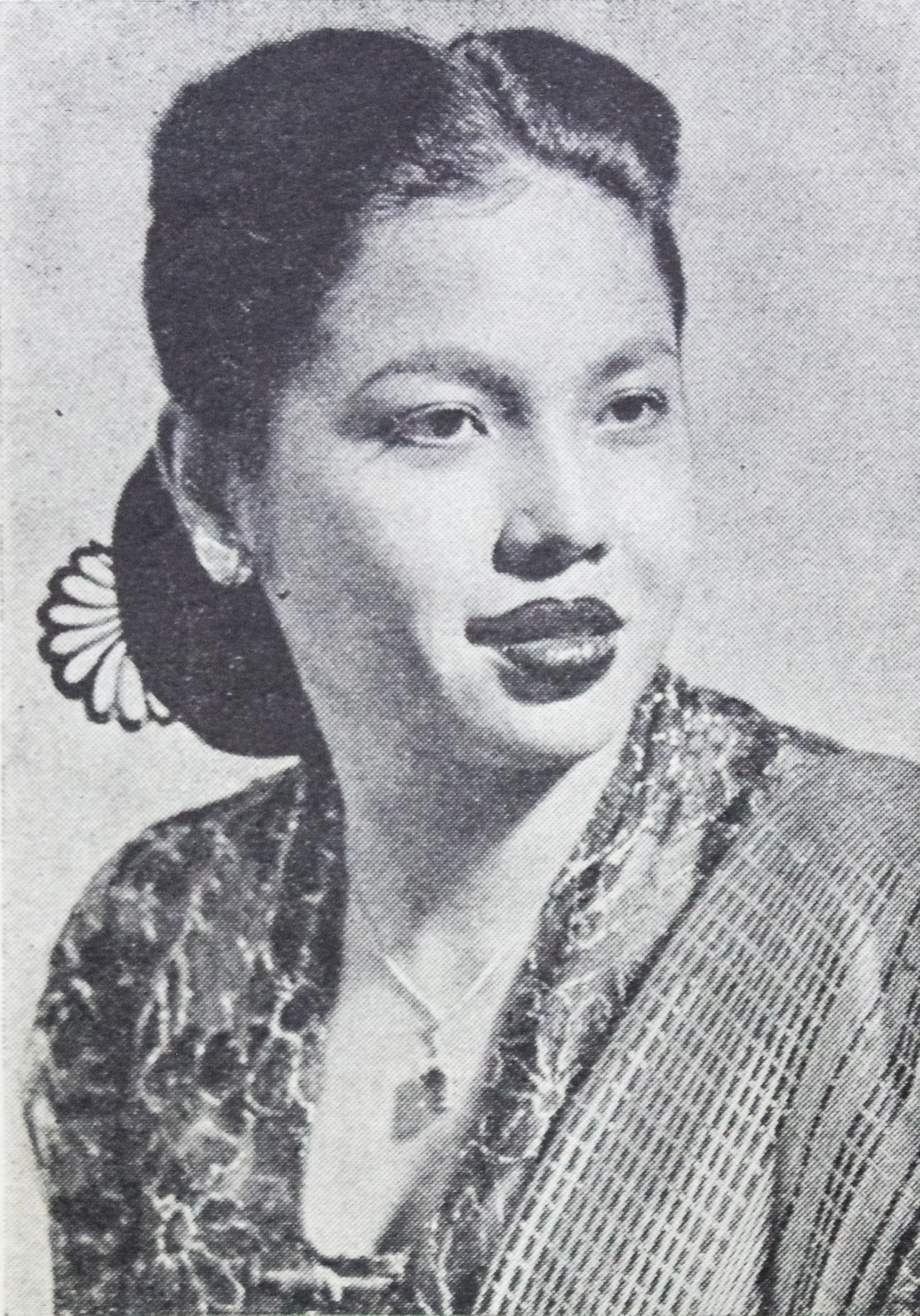
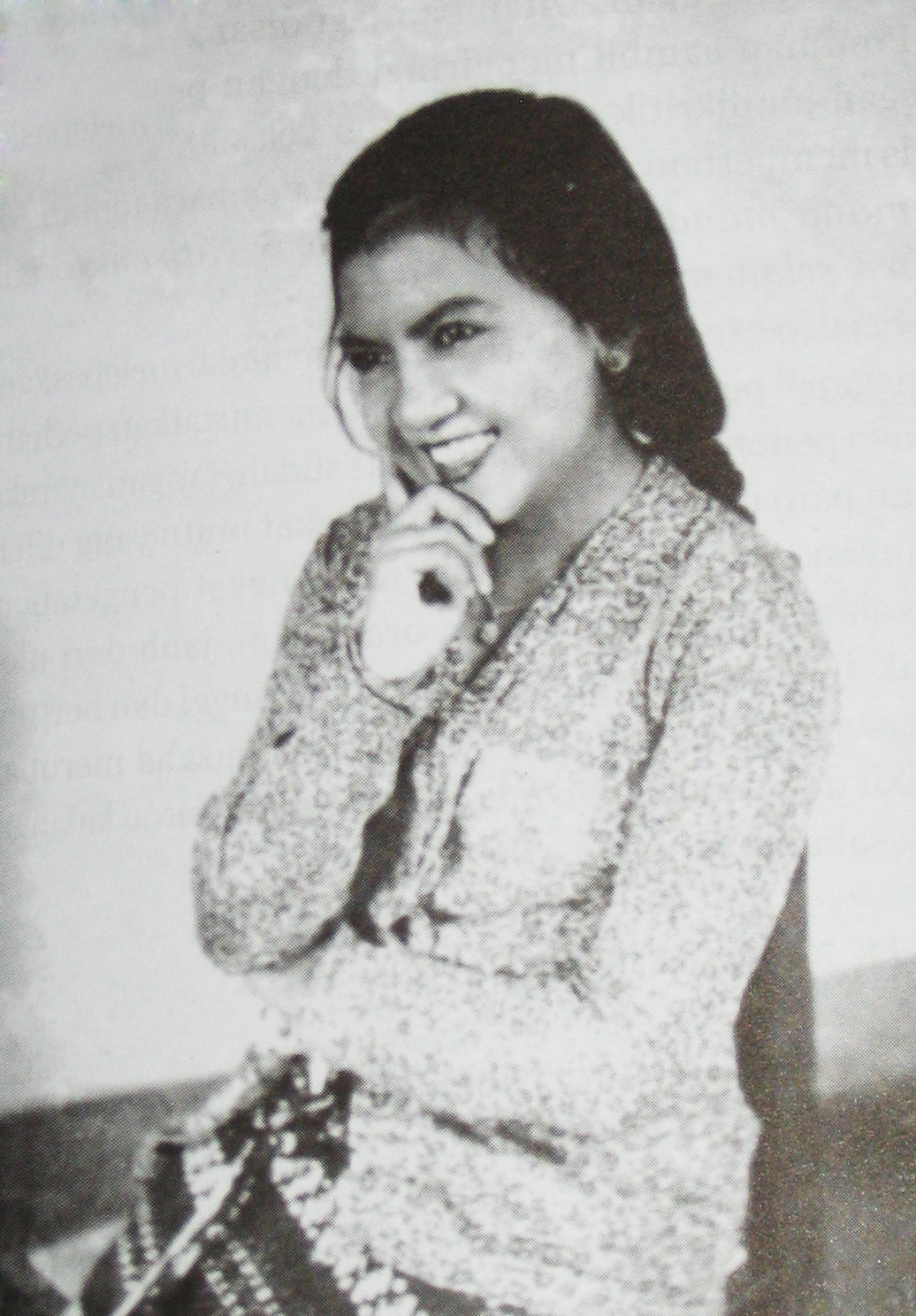
Both Dhalia (left) and Soerip continued acting until the 1990s.

Following Panggilan Darah, Oriental – which had been losing money steadily – released its contract for the ANIF studio, which was taken over by the Dutch-run Multi Film. Despite hopes that they would continue producing narrative films, perhaps with less modern equipment, the company was dissolved. Oriental's actors and crew members migrated to different studios. Suska was signed to Java Industrial Film and directed a single film for them, Ratna Moetoe Manikam. Dhalia went to Populair's Film and acted in one production, Moestika dari Djemar (The Jewel of Djemar; 1942), before the Japanese occupation in March 1942 closed that studio. Soerip, meanwhile, joined Njoo and Young at Majestic Film, acting in two productions before that studio was closed.

Although Oriental was short-lived, several of the actors and crew it hired went on to lengthy careers. Njoo, after handling two films for Majestic in 1941, spent much of the decade in theatre before returning to directing in the mid-1950s. Fifi Young, who continued acting for Njoo until their divorce in 1945, appeared in more than eighty films before her death in 1975. Dhalia and Soerip likewise had lengthy careers: both acted until the 1990s, Dhalia in 52 productions and Soerip in 25.

== Filmography ==
In a period of two years, Oriental released four films; all were feature length, made in black-and-white, and received wide releases in the Dutch East Indies. Some, such as Panggilan Darah, enjoyed international release; the film was screened in Singapore (then part of the Straits Settlements) by September 1941. The company's productions were targeted at low-income audiences and extensively used kroncong music, for the recording of which the company established the Oriental Novelty Five. Though its films were screened at least into the 1950s, (Note: For instance, Zoebaida played as late as October 1947 (Pelita Rakjat 1947, (untitled)) and Panggilan Darah was screened until at least August 1952 (Algemeen Indisch Dagblad 1952, Cinemas).) Oriental's output may be lost. (Note: In common with the rest of the world, movies in the Indies were made on highly flammable nitrate film, and after a fire destroyed much of Produksi Film Negara's warehouse in 1952, many films shot on nitrate were deliberately destroyed to prevent further such mishaps (Biran 2012, p. 291). As such, the American visual anthropologist Karl G. Heider suggests that all Indonesian films from before 1950 are lost.(Heider 1991, p. 14) However, J.B. Kristanto's Katalog Film Indonesia records several as having survived at Sinematek Indonesia's archives, and Biran writes that several Japanese propaganda films have survived at the Netherlands Government Information Service (Biran 2009, p. 351).)

- 1940: Kris Mataram
- 1940: Zoebaida
- 1941: Pantjawarna
- 1941: Panggilan Darah
- 1951: The River

== Works cited ==
- Biran, Misbach Yusa, ed. (1979). Apa Siapa Orang Film Indonesia 1926–1978 [What and Who: Film Figures in Indonesia, 1926–1978] (in Indonesian). Jakarta: Sinematek Indonesia. OCLC 6655859.
- Biran, Misbach Yusa (2009). Sejarah Film 1900–1950: Bikin Film di Jawa [History of Film 1900–1950: Making Films in Java] (in Indonesian). Jakarta: Komunitas Bamboo working with the Jakarta Art Council. ISBN 978-979-3731-58-2.
- Biran, Misbach Yusa (2012). "Film di Masa Kolonial" [Film in the Colonial Period]. Indonesia dalam Arus Sejarah: Masa Pergerakan Kebangsaan [Indonesia in the Flow of Time: The Nationalist Movement] (in Indonesian). Vol. V. Jakarta: Ministry of Education and Culture. pp. 268–93. ISBN 978-979-9226-97-6.
- "Cinemas". Algemeen Indisch Dagblad de Preangerbode (in Dutch). 15 August 1952. p. 4.
- "Fifi Young" (in Indonesian). Jakarta: Taman Ismail Marzuki. Archived from the original on 1 January 2014.
- "Filmografi Dhalia" [Filmography for Dhalia]. filmindonesia.or.id (in Indonesian). Jakarta: Konfiden Foundation. Archived from the original on 6 March 2014.
- "Filmografi Njoo Cheong Seng" [Filmography for Njoo Cheong Seng]. filmindonesia.or.id (in Indonesian). Jakarta: Konfiden Foundation. Archived from the original on 20 February 2015.
- "Filmografi Nonie Tan" [Filmography for Nonie Tan]. filmindonesia.or.id (in Indonesian). Jakarta: Konfiden Foundation. Archived from the original on 8 August 2014.
- "Filmografi Soerip" [Filmography for Soerip]. filmindonesia.or.id (in Indonesian). Jakarta: Konfiden Foundation. Archived from the original on 3 February 2014.
- "Filmografi Suska" [Filmography for Suska]. filmindonesia.or.id (in Indonesian). Jakarta: Konfiden Foundation. Archived from the original on 16 April 2014.
- Heider, Karl G (1991). Indonesian Cinema: National Culture on Screen. Honolulu: University of Hawaii Press. ISBN 978-0-8248-1367-3.
- Khoe, Tjeng Liem (19 October 1940). "Industrie Film di Indonesia" [The Film Industry in Indonesia]. Sin Po (in Indonesian). Vol. 18, no. 916. Batavia. pp. 9–11.
- "Kris Mataram". filmindonesia.or.id (in Indonesian). Jakarta: Konfiden Foundation. Archived from the original on 2 December 2013.
- "'Kris Mataram' Heden in Sampoerna" ['Kris Mataram' Today in Sampoerna]. Soerabaijasch Handelsblad (in Dutch). Surabaya. 8 July 1940. p. 6.
- "Panggilan Darah". filmindonesia.or.id (in Indonesian). Jakarta: Konfiden Foundation. Archived from the original on 2 December 2013.
- "Rex: Pantjawarna". Bataviaasch Nieuwsblad (in Dutch). Batavia. 19 March 1941. p. 5.
- "Sampoerna: Pantjawarna". Soerabaijasch Handelsblad (in Dutch). Surabaya. 27 March 1941. p. 6.
- "Sampoerna: 'Zoebaida'". De Indische courant (in Dutch). Surabaya: Kolff & Co. 21 December 1940. p. 2.
- Setiogi, Sari P. (23 April 2003). "'Molenvliet' Marked Batavia's Golden Age". The Jakarta Post. Jakarta. Archived from the original on 27 July 2014.
- "Tanja Djawab" [Questions and Answers]. Pertjatoeran Doenia Dan Film (in Indonesian). 1 (4). Batavia: 52–53. June 1941.
- "(untitled)". Pelita Rakjat (in Indonesian). Surabaya. 15 October 1947. p. 2.
- "(untitled)". The Straits Times. Singapore. 21 September 1941. p. 4.
- "Warta dari Studio" [Reports from the Studios]. Pertjatoeran Doenia Dan Film (in Indonesian). 1 (1). Batavia: 18–20. June 1941.
- "Zoebaida". filmindonesia.or.id (in Indonesian). Jakarta: Konfiden Foundation. Archived from the original on 2 December 2013.
