= Inoe Perbatasari =

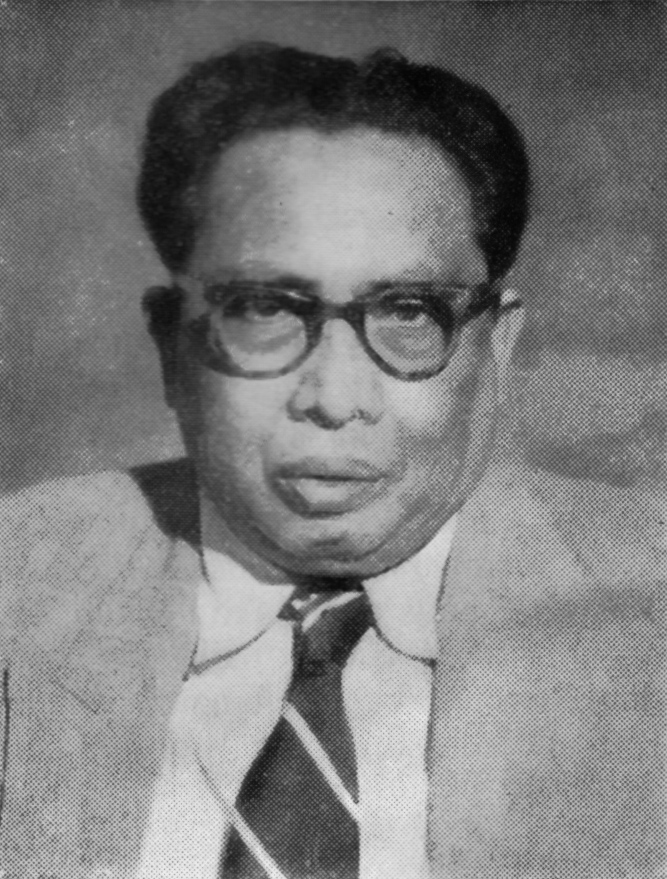
Perbatasari, c. 1954

Raden Inoe Perbatasari (1899 – 18 October 1954) was an Indonesian politician turned film director and actor.

Perbatasari, who had a background in journalism and had previously led the dailies Oetoesan Indonesia and Bintang Timoer, was politically active in the late 1920s as a member of the Indonesian National Party (Partai Nasional Indonesia), a native political party in the Dutch East Indies. By the 1930s, he was active in the Bolero touring troupe, under Andjar Asmara. When Andjar went to Java Industrial Film to become a director for The Teng Chun, Perbatasari was one of several Bolero members to join. They appeared in their first production, Kartinah, in 1940. The film, which followed the love between a nurse and her superior, featured Perbatasari as Ratna Asmara's character's uncle.

The following year saw Perbatasari active in three films. Aside from a minor role in Ratna Moetoe Manikam, he made his directorial debut with Elang Darat, which was published by JIF's subsidiary Jacatra Pictures. Elang Darat was a detective story which followed an inspector named Parlan in his investigation of a bandit known only as "Elang Darat". Perbatasari's second film, Poetri Rimba (Jungle Princess), followed a hunter as he attempted to escape from bandits.

After the Empire of Japan occupied the Indies beginning in 1942, Perbatasari collaborated with the Japanese forces in making the propaganda film Hoedjan for the studio Nippon Eigasha. He also worked at the Japanese-led Cultural Centre in Jakarta.

Perbatasari is recorded as working on three films after Indonesia was formally recognised in 1949. The first, Djiwa Pemuda, was released in 1951. The screenplay, Perbatasari's only contribution to the film, followed two former guerrillas from the National Revolution feuding over a woman's love. This was followed by two directorial works: Sekuntum Bunga Ditepi Danau (A Bouquet of Flowers on the Lake Shore; 1952) and Kembali ke Masjarakat (Return to the People; 1954), both of which dealt with the revolution.

Perbatasari died at Cikini Hospital in Jakarta on 18 October 1954. He did most of his post-revolution work with the National Film Company (Perusahaan Film Nasional), working in management.

== Filmography ==
During his career Perbatasari directed five films (including one short) and acted in two. He also wrote several films.

Actor

- Kartinah (1940)
- Ratna Moetoe Manikam (1941)

Crew

- Elang Darat (1941) – Director and screenwriter
- Poetri Rimba (Jungle Princess; 1941) – Director
- Hoedjan (Rain; 1944; short film) – Director and screenwriter
- Djiwa Pemuda (Soul of the Youth; 1951) – Screenwriter
- Sekuntum Bunga Ditepi Danau (A Bouquet of Flowers on the Lake Shore; 1952) – Director and screenwriter
- Kembali ke Masjarakat (Return to the People; 1954) – Director
