= Panggilan Darah =

1941 film by Sutan Usman Karim

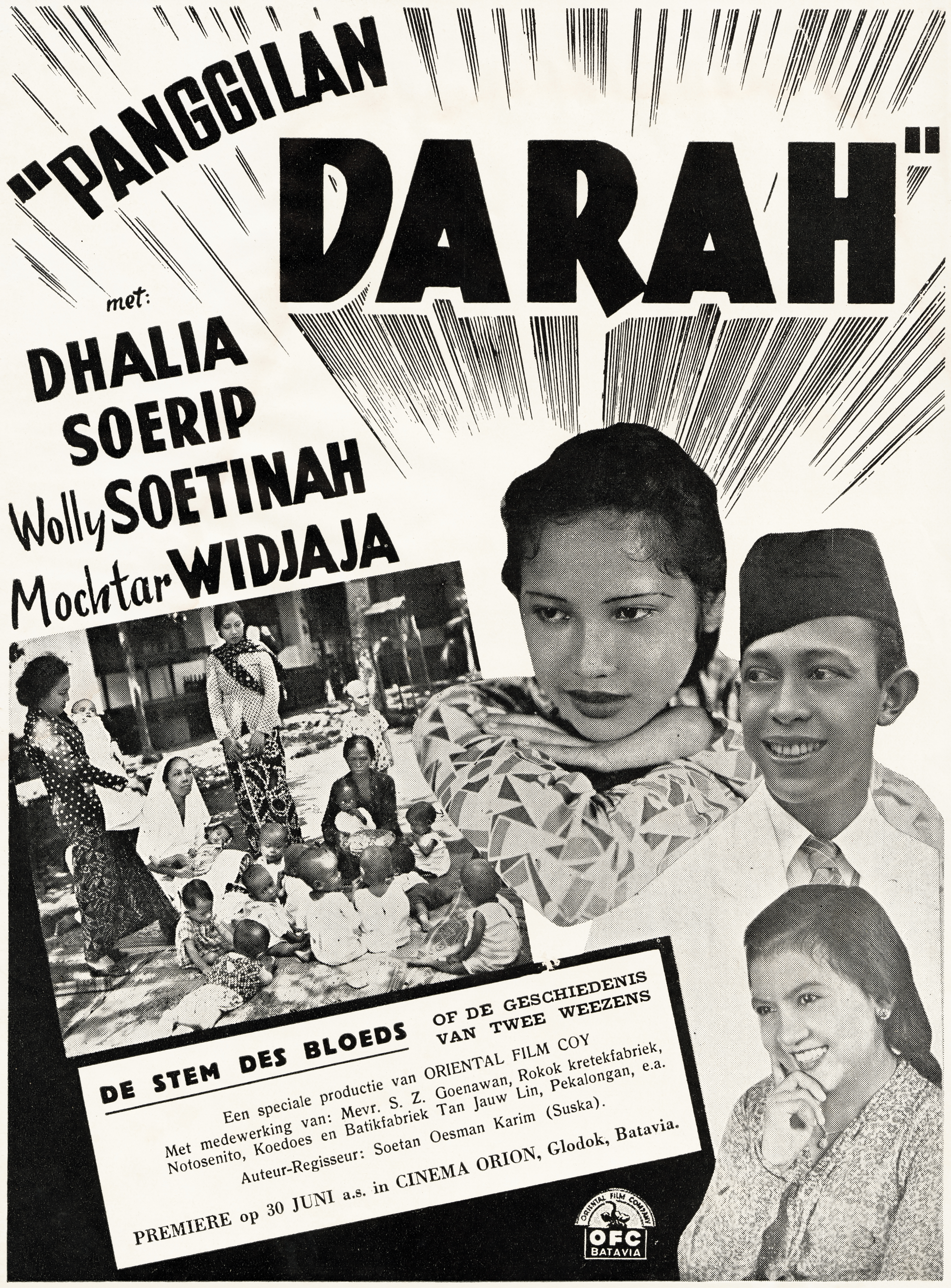
- Magazine advertisement, De Orient
- Directed by: Sutan Usman Karim
- Screenplay by: Sutan Usman Karim
- Produced by: Tjho Seng Han
- Starring: Dhalia; Soerip
- Production company: Oriental Film
- Release date: 30 June 1941 (Dutch East Indies)
- Country: Dutch East Indies
- Language: Indonesian

Panggilan Darah (Indonesian for 'Call of Blood') is a 1941 film from the Dutch East Indies (now Indonesia) written and directed by Sutan Usman Karim and produced by Tjho Seng Han for Oriental Film. The black-and-white film starred Dhalia and Soerip as orphaned sisters trying to make a living in the colonial capital of Batavia (now Jakarta) before moving to Kudus to work at a clove cigarette factory.

Shot on location at an orphanage and two factories in central Java, Panggilan Darah was a modest commercial success in the Indies and Singapore. Its soundtrack, which featured nine kroncong songs, received popular acclaim, and the film's acting received critical praise. Despite this success, Oriental was unable to recoup its expenses, and merged into Multi Film soon afterwards. Panggilan Darah, which was screened as late as 1952, may now be lost.

== Plot ==
Orphaned sisters Dhalia and Soerip (themselves) leave their village in an attempt to make a living in the colonial capital of Batavia (now Jakarta). After a long period of misery, they are accepted as housemaids at the home of Hajji Iskak (Mochtar Widjaja). Although initially elated, they find that Iskak's wife (Wolly Sutinah) is a cruel mistress who often beats them. Meanwhile, Iskak's would-be son-in-law is constantly flirting with Dhalia, much to his fiancée's dismay.

The sisters decide to run away from Iskak's home. They make their way to Kudus and find work at the Nitisemito clove cigarette factory with the help of their friend (S. Poniman). Not long after their escape, Iskak receives a guest who reveals that the two were his nieces. This revelation spurs Iskak to take out advertisements in newspapers, looking for the young women and asking them to return to Batavia.

Iskak's search has little success until the sisters receive news that he is looking for them, and they quickly return to Batavia. There, the sisters are greeted with open arms. Iskak's wife regrets her earlier treatment of the girls and repents, treating them splendidly and supporting Dhalia's plans to open an orphanage.

== Production ==
Panggilan Darah was the directorial debut of Sutan Usman Karim, commonly known as Suska, a journalist and former member of the touring theatrical group Bolero under Andjar Asmara. With Panggilan Darah, which he also wrote, Suska became one of several reporters who entered the film industry in the 1940s. (Note: Others included Andjar Asmara and Inoe Perbatasari (Biran 2009, pp. 216, 262).) He directed the film for the Batavia-based film company Oriental, run by the ethnic Chinese producer Tjho Seng Han. The production house had previously released three films, all directed by Njoo Cheong Seng, but after Njoo departed for Fred Young's Majestic, Oriental had required a new director.

The film was shot in black and white by the Indo cameraman J. J. W. Steffens, with editing handled by Soemardjan. Scenes were shot at an orphanage for Muslims owned by S. Z. Gunawan (who played herself in the film), as well as at the Nitisemito cigarette factory in Kudus and at a batik factory in Pekalongan owned by Tan Jauw Lin. Writing in 2009, the Indonesian film historian Misbach Yusa Biran suggested that the film may have been partly sponsored by Nitisemito—one of the largest cigarette factories in the Indies in the 1940s—based on the factory's prominence in the plot.

Dhalia, Soerip, and S. Poniman, already known for their singing prowess, starred in Panggilan Darah, which featured nine kroncong songs. (Note: Kroncong is a type of traditional music with Portuguese influences which was highly popular with the lower-class indigene of the time (Biran 1982, p. 11).) Additional roles were taken by Wolly Sutinah and Mochtar Widjaja. The film marked Sutinah's debut for the company; the other cast members had previous screen credits with Oriental.

== Release and reception ==
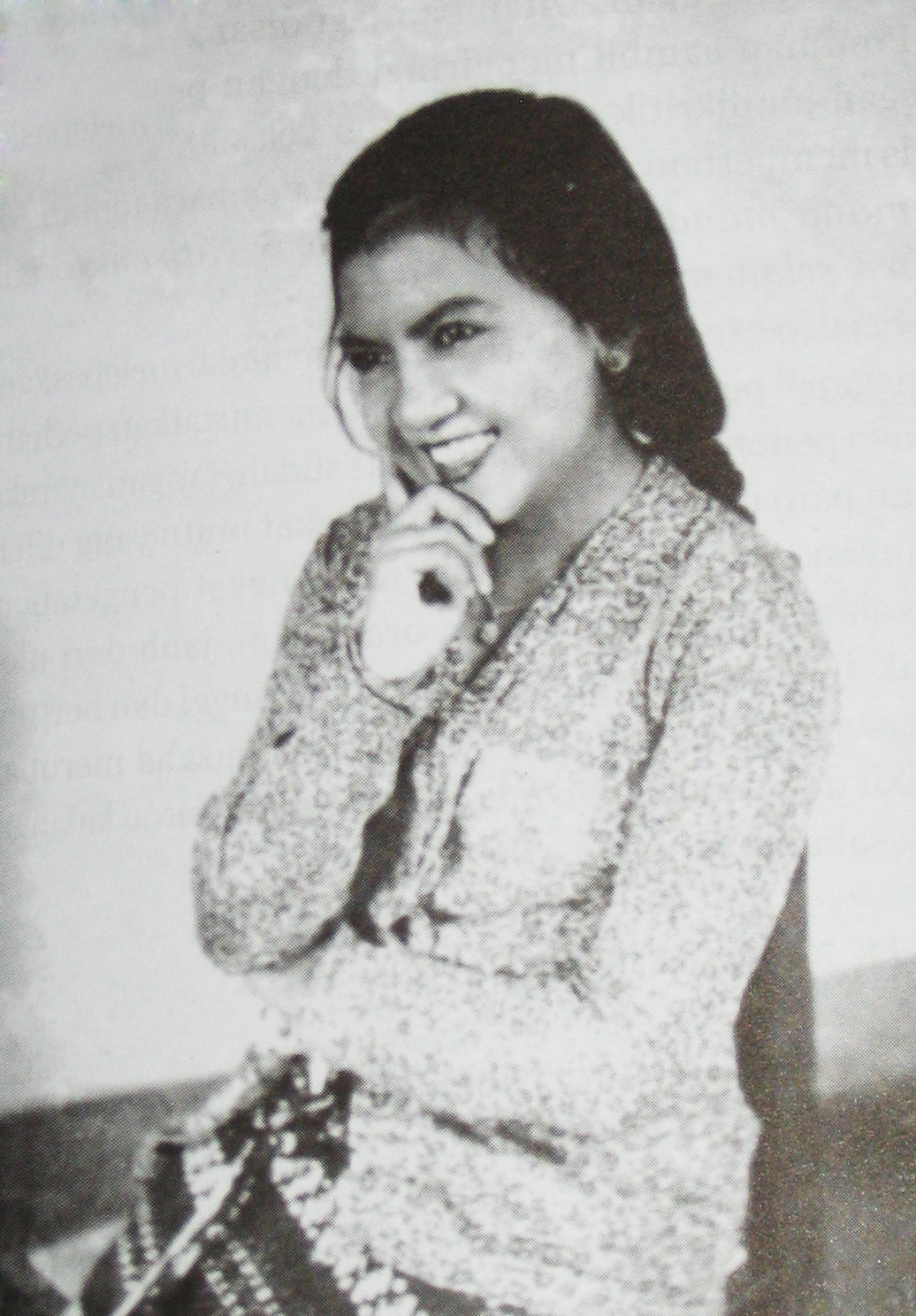
Promotional image of Soerip released for the film

Panggilan Darah debuted at the Orion Theatre in Batavia on 30 June 1941. It was reported as a modest success, making most of its money from lower class audiences. It was screened in Surabaya, East Java, by August, and by September it had been shown in Singapore, then part of British Malaya. A novelisation by Roestam Sutan Palindih was published by the Yogyakarta-based Kolff-Buning Publishers that year.

Reviews of Panggilan Darah were mixed to positive. The journalist Soerono, (Note: Soerono was, at the time he wrote the article, the editor of the weekly Adil and the monthly Alfatch (Soerono 1941, p. 18).) writing in the entertainment magazine Pertjatoeran Doenia dan Film, was pleased with the film's depiction of the Islamic mandate to take care of orphans. An anonymous review in the Surabaya-based daily Soerabaijasch Handelsblad found the film "something special" (Note: Original: "is iets bijzonders".) and praised Soerip's spontaneity in her role. Biran wrote that lower-class audiences enjoyed the film's music, while the intelligentsia scoffed at the idea that a factory supervisor would bring a guitar to work. He found the plot illogical, asking why the sisters would not have worked in their own home village and how the destitute sisters could have made the journey from Batavia to Kudus, over 400 kilometres (250 mi) away.

== Legacy ==
Unable to recoup its expenses, Oriental later merged into the Dutch-owned Multi Film and ceased producing works of fiction. Suska left the company and joined The Teng Chun's Java Industrial Film, for which he directed Ratna Moetoe Manikam. Most of the cast remained active in cinema for the remainder of their lives. Both Dhalia and Soerip remained in the film industry for the next fifty years; they acted in their last feature films, Pendekar Jagad Kelana (Warrior of Jagad Kelana) and Sejak Cinta Diciptakan (Since Love was Created) respectively, in 1990. Poniman and Sutinah would remain active in the industry until 1975 and 1986. Only Widjaja is not recorded as performing in any more films.

Panggilan Darah was screened as late as August 1952, but may now be lost. As elsewhere in the world at the time, movies in the Indies used highly flammable nitrate film stock, and after a fire destroyed much of Produksi Film Negara's warehouse in 1952, films shot on nitrate were deliberately destroyed. The American visual anthropologist Karl G. Heider writes that all Indonesian films from before 1950 are lost. However, J. B. Kristanto's Katalog Film Indonesia (Indonesian Film Catalogue) records several as having survived at Sinematek Indonesia's archives, and Biran writes that several Japanese propaganda films have survived at the Netherlands Government Information Service.

== Works cited ==
- Biran, Misbach Yusa (1982). Selintas Kilas Sejarah Film Indonesia [A Brief Look at the History of Indonesian Cinema] (in Indonesian). Jakarta: Badan Pelaksana FFI 1982. OCLC 841356809.
- Biran, Misbach Yusa (2009). Sejarah Film 1900–1950: Bikin Film di Jawa [History of Film 1900–1950: Making Films in Java] (in Indonesian). Jakarta: Komunitas Bamboo working with the Jakarta Art Council. ISBN 978-979-3731-58-2.
- Biran, Misbach Yusa (2012). "Film di Masa Kolonial" [Film in the Colonial Period]. Indonesia dalam Arus Sejarah: Masa Pergerakan Kebangsaan [Indonesia in the Flow of Time: The Nationalist Movement] (in Indonesian). Vol. V. Jakarta: Ministry of Education and Culture. pp. 268–93. ISBN 978-979-9226-97-6.
- "Cinemas". Algemeen Indisch Dagblad de Preangerbode (in Dutch). 15 August 1952. p. 4.
- "Film Sampoerna theater "Panggilan Darah"". Soerabaijasch Handelsblad (in Dutch). Surabaya: Kolff & Co. 21 August 1941. p. 6.
- "Filmografi Dhalia" [Filmography for Dhalia]. filmindonesia.or.id (in Indonesian). Jakarta: Konfiden Foundation. Archived from the original on 6 March 2014.
- "Filmografi Mochtar Widjaja" [Filmography for Mochtar Widjaja]. filmindonesia.or.id (in Indonesian). Jakarta: Konfiden Foundation. Archived from the original on 6 March 2014.
- "Filmografi S Poniman" [Filmography for S Poniman]. filmindonesia.or.id (in Indonesian). Jakarta: Konfiden Foundation. Archived from the original on 6 March 2014.
- "Filmografi Soerip" [Filmography for Soerip]. filmindonesia.or.id (in Indonesian). Jakarta: Konfiden Foundation. Archived from the original on 3 February 2014.
- "Filmografi Wolly Sutinah" [Filmography for Wolly Sutinah]. filmindonesia.or.id (in Indonesian). Jakarta: Konfiden Foundation. Archived from the original on 7 March 2016.
- Heider, Karl G (1991). Indonesian Cinema: National Culture on Screen. Honolulu: University of Hawaii Press. ISBN 978-0-8248-1367-3.
- "Kredit Panggilan Darah" [Credits for Panggilan Darah]. filmindonesia.or.id (in Indonesian). Jakarta: Konfiden Foundation. Archived from the original on 3 April 2016.
- "Panggilan Darah". filmindonesia.or.id (in Indonesian). Jakarta: Konfiden Foundation. Archived from the original on 2 December 2013.
- Panggilan Darah. WorldCat. OCLC 67870955.
- Soerono (July 1941). "Film dan Agama" [Film and Religion]. Pertjatoeran Doenia Dan Film (in Indonesian). 1 (2). Batavia: 18–19.
- "Sun Talkies". The Straits Times. 21 September 1941. p. 4.
- "Warta dari Studio" [Reports from the Studios]. Pertjatoeran Doenia Dan Film (in Indonesian). 1 (1). Batavia: 18–20. June 1941.
- "Warta dari Studio" [Reports from the Studios]. Pertjatoeran Doenia Dan Film (in Indonesian). 1 (2). Batavia: 27–29. July 1941.
