= Soerip =

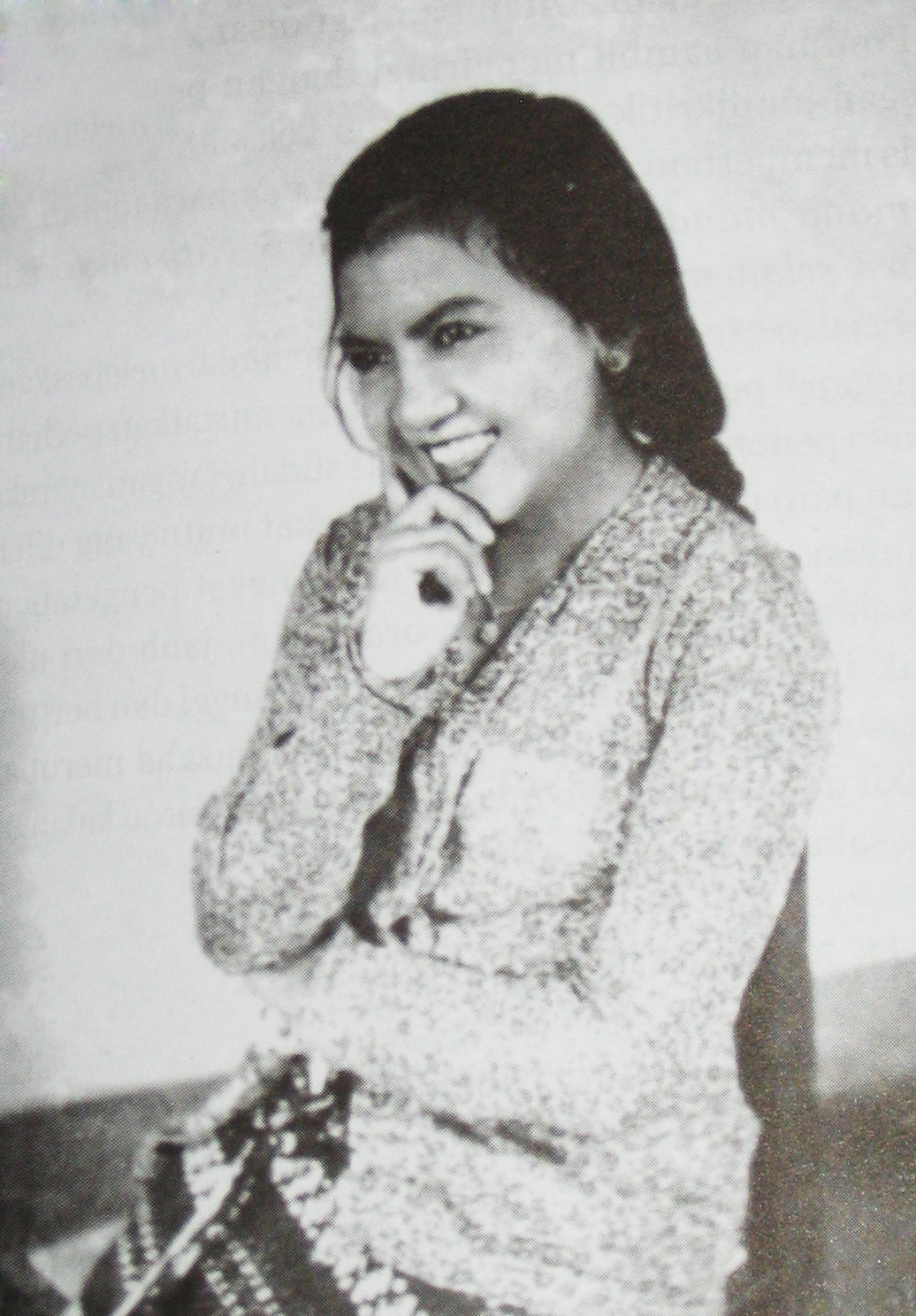
- Promotional image of Soerip for Panggilan Darah (1941)
- Born: 22 October 19? (Note: Soerip's year of birth is uncertain, as various sources claim 1916 and 1921.); Banyuwangi, Dutch East Indies
- Died: 7 May 1992 (aged 70 or 75); Jakarta, Indonesia
- Occupations: Singer; actress
- Years active: 1940–1992

Anastasya Soerip (Perfected Spelling: Surip; 22 October 19? – 7 May 1992) was an Indonesian singer and actress.

== Biography ==
Soerip was born in Banyuwangi, East Java, Dutch East Indies. She only completed two years of elementary school before she dropped out. She later became a kroncong singer, often billed as Miss Soerip. Owing to her habit of batting her eyelashes while singing, she was also nicknamed "Si Mata Roda".

In 1940, Soerip made her feature film debut in Zoebaida, directed by Njoo Cheong Seng for Oriental Film. This was followed in 1941 by Panggilan Darah, in which Soerip was cast with Dhalia as orphaned sisters who try to make a living in the colonial capital of Batavia (now Jakarta). When the company folded, unable to recoup its expenses, Soerip migrated to Majestic Film. She completed three productions for the company: Air Mata Iboe, Djantoeng Hati, and Pantjawarna.

After the Japanese occupation of the Indies in March 1942, in which all but one domestic film studio was shut down. During this period, Soerip married and later gave birth to her first son, Paul Irama, in 1950. She had a total of six children and fourteen grandchildren. Soerip took a thirty-year hiatus from film, only returning to the industry in 1973 for Sopir Taxi. Owing to her age, she took the honorific Mbah (Grandmother), and was billed Mbah Soerip. During the following two decades she completed a further 20 films, including productions by Slamet Rahardjo, Teguh Karya, and Wim Umboh. A retrospective in Apa Siapa Film Indonesia particularly praises her performance in Rahardjo's Rembulan dan Matahari (1979).

In 1990, Soerip made her last film, Cintaku di Way Kambas, and a soap opera, Bayang-Bayang. That year she was recognised by the National Film Council for her dedication to acting. In March 1992, Soerip fell while getting off from Metromini at Blok M-Pasar Minggu, and had to use a walking stick since then. She was diagnosed with a throat cancer and later died from the disease at Dr. Esnawan Antariksa Air Force Hospital, in Makasar, East Jakarta, on 7 May 1992, with her age was reported as 75.

== Filmography ==
- Zoebaida (1940)
- Pantjawarna (1941)
- Panggilan Darah (1941)
- Djantoeng Hati (1941)
- Air Mata Iboe (1941)
- Sopir Taksi (1973)
- Fajar Menyingsing (1975)
- Anak Emas (1976)
- Akulah Vivian (Laki-laki Jadi Perempuan) (1977)
- Koboi Cilik (1977)
- Duo Kribo (1977)
- November 1828 (1978)
- Rembulan dan Matahari (1979)
- Usia 18 (1980)
- Seputih Hatinya Semerah Bibirnya (1980)
- Perempuan dalam Pasungan (1980)
- Bunga-bunga Perkawinan (1981)
- Tirai Malam Pengantin (1983)
- Luka Hati Sang Bidadari (1983)
- Telaga Air Mata (1986)
- Beri Aku Waktu (1986)
- Di Balik Dinding Kelabu (1986)
- Aku Benci Kamu (1987)
- Sesaat dalam Pelukan (1989)
- Dua dari Tiga Laki-laki (2 dari 3 Laki-laki) (1989)
- Cintaku di Way Kambas (1990)
- Sejak Cinta Diciptakan (1990)

== Works cited ==
- Apa Siapa Orang Film Indonesia [What and Who: Film Figures in Indonesia] (in Indonesian). Jakarta: Indonesian Ministry of Information. 1999. OCLC 44427179.
- Biran, Misbach Yusa, ed. (1979). Apa Siapa Orang Film Indonesia 1926–1978 [What and Who: Film Figures in Indonesia, 1926–1978]. Sinematek Indonesia. OCLC 6655859.
- Biran, Misbach Yusa (2009). Sejarah Film 1900–1950: Bikin Film di Jawa [History of Film 1900–1950: Making Films in Java] (in Indonesian). Jakarta: Komunitas Bamboo working with the Jakarta Art Council. ISBN 978-979-3731-58-2.
- "Filmografi Soerip" [Filmography for Soerip]. filmindonesia.or.id (in Indonesian). Jakarta: Konfiden Foundation. Archived from the original on 3 February 2014.
- "Panggilan Darah". filmindonesia.or.id (in Indonesian). Jakarta: Konfiden Foundation. Archived from the original on 2 December 2013.
- "Soerip, Miss". Encyclopedia of Jakarta (in Indonesian). Jakarta City Government. Archived from the original on 4 March 2016.
- TJO (10 May 1992). ""Mbah" Surip Meninggal Dunia" ["Grandma" Surip Dies]. Kompas (in Indonesian). p. 1.
