= Moestika dari Djemar =

1941 film by Jo An Djan

Moestika dari Djemar (Perfected Spelling: Mustika dari Djemar) is a 1941 film from the Dutch East Indies (now Indonesia). Multiple modern sources also use the incorrect spelling Moestika dari Djenar, but contemporary sources uses an "m".

Moestika dari Djemar was directed by Jo An Djan and produced by Jo Kim Tjan for Populair's Film. The black-and-white film starred Dhalia, Rd Mochtar, Rd Kosasie, Eddy T Effendi, and 9-year-old Djoeriah (in her feature film debut). The studio had been established the preceding year and already released a single film, Garoeda Mas, the year before.

The film was produced shortly following Ratna Moetoe Manikam, released with The Teng Chun's Java Industrial Film, and took similar source material: as with Moestika dari Djemar, it was drawn from the One Thousand and One Arabian Nights, though the films were taken from different stories. Other contemporary works adapted from Nights were Tan's Film's Aladin and Koeda Sembrani; neither of the latter films were completed when the Japanese occupation began in 1942.

Moestika dari Djemar was shown as early as 8 January 1942, playing in Cirebon. By February it had reached Surabaya, in eastern Java. It was targeted at audiences of all ages and advertised "brilliant costumes – mysticism – adventure and romance".

The film is likely lost. The American visual anthropologist Karl G. Heider writes that all Indonesian films from before 1950 are lost. However, JB Kristanto's Katalog Film Indonesia (Indonesian Film Catalogue) records several as having survived at Sinematek Indonesia's archives, and Biran writes that several Japanese propaganda films have survived at the Netherlands Government Information Service.

== Works cited ==
- Biran, Misbach Yusa (2009). Sejarah Film 1900–1950: Bikin Film di Jawa [History of Film 1900–1950: Making Films in Java] (in Indonesian). Jakarta: Komunitas Bamboo working with the Jakarta Art Council. ISBN 978-979-3731-58-2.
- Heider, Karl G (1991). Indonesian Cinema: National Culture on Screen. Honolulu: University of Hawaii Press. ISBN 978-0-8248-1367-3.
- "Moestika dari Djenar". filmindonesia.or.id (in Indonesian). Jakarta: Konfiden Foundation. Archived from the original on 2 December 2013.
- "(untitled)". Bataviaasch Nieuwsblad (in Dutch). Kolff & Co. 8 January 1942. p. 8.
- "(untitled)". Soerabaijasch Handelsblad (in Dutch). Kolff & Co. 11 February 1942. p. 7.
