= S. Poniman =

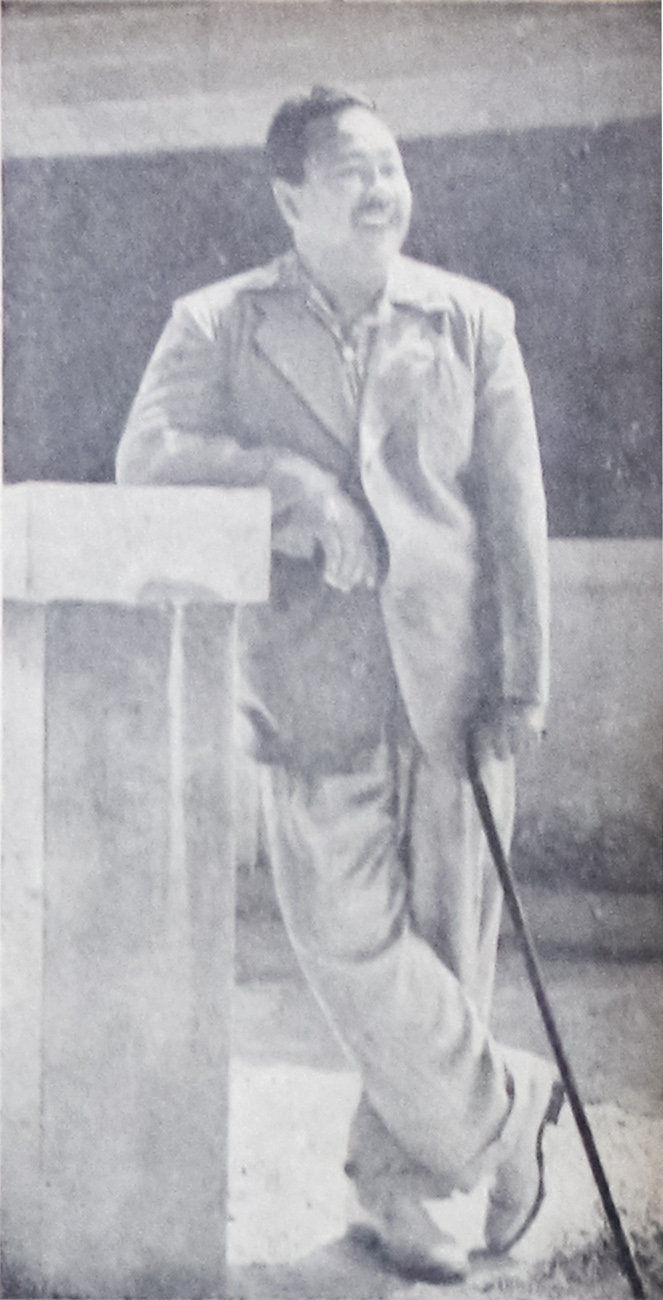
- Poniman in 1956
- Born: 5 July 1910; Banda Aceh, Dutch East Indies
- Died: 1 January 1978 (aged 67); Jakarta, Indonesia
- Occupation(s): Singer, actor
- Years active: 1930s–1975

S. Poniman (5 July 1910 – 1 January 1978) was an Indonesian kroncong singer and comic actor. Born in Banda Aceh in 1910, he took up singing and made his way to Batavia (now Jakarta). In 1940 he made his debut as music director and actor on the film Kedok Ketawa, completing three further productions before the Japanese occupation brought film production to a near-standstill. Poniman spent time as a soldier and truck driver before returning to the film industry in 1951, after Indonesia's independence, as a star of Dunia Gila. Between 1951 and 1958 he appeared in more than twenty films before leaving the struggling industry to become a trader. Though he appeared in several further films before his death, Poniman never regained his stardom.

== Biography ==
Poniman was born in Banda Aceh, Aceh, Dutch East Indies, on 5 July 1910. He completed elementary school at a Hollandsch-Inlandsche School (an elementary school for indigenous Indonesians). As a youth he gained acclaim for his skills as a kroncong musician, writing such songs as "Potong Padi", "Senja Sunyi", "Hening", "Pendekar Satria", and "Sumpah si Dia". By the late 1930s he had reached the colonial capital at Batavia (later Jakarta).

In 1940, Poniman was contracted by Union Films to appear in the company's first feature film, Kedok Ketawa. Poniman, aside from taking a small role in the action film, was responsible for the film's soundtrack. Later that year he was associated with Oriental Film and took two supporting roles in the company's Fifi Young vehicles, Zoebaida (1940) and Pantjawarna (1941). When Young and her husband, the director Njoo Cheong Seng, migrated to Majestic Film, Poniman joined them. He made one final film, Air Mata Iboe (1941), before the Japanese occupation began in March 1942 and closed all but one of the Indies' film studios.

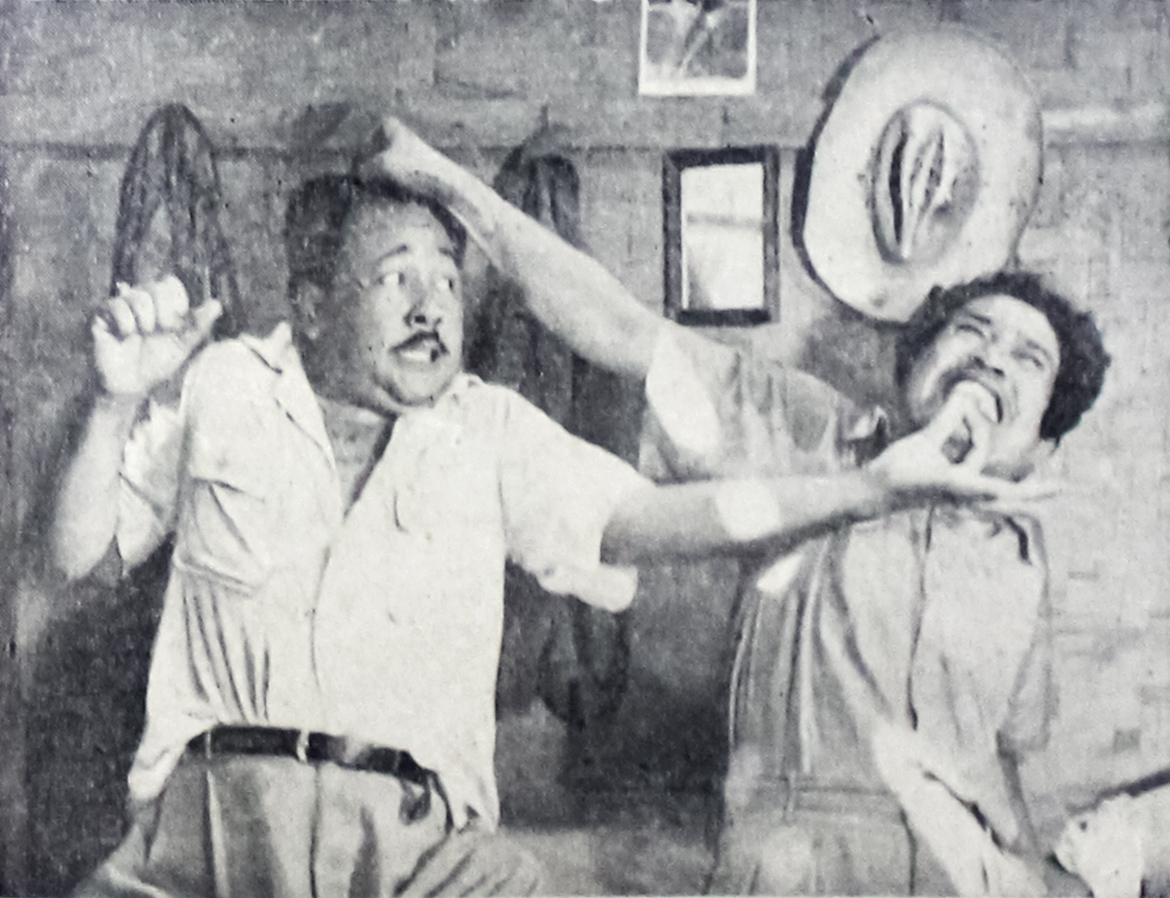
Poniman (left) in Malam Minggu (1955)

During the Indonesian National Revolution, which began in 1945 and lasted until the Dutch recognized Indonesia's independence in 1949, Poniman became a soldier and bore arms. After the revolution he spent time as a truck driver on the Jakarta–Semarang route, but in 1951 he returned to film, starring in Dunia Gila alongside Rd. Mochtar and Titien Sumarni. He completed the bulk of his film work in the subsequent eight years, appearing in such films as Pahit-Pahit Manis (1952), Putri Solo (1953), Djandjiku Djandjimu (1954), and Malam Minggu (1955).

Domestic film production began to falter in the late 1950s. Poniman left the industry to become a trader. At one point he also took up photography and began producing documentary films for his own Poniman Show and Film Company. Poniman never regained his stardom, despite resurfacing to complete three films in 1963 and making a brief comeback in the early 1970s, appearing in four films (including a remake of Putri Solo in 1974). He died on 1 January 1978 in Jakarta, aged 67, three years after completing his final film (Rahasia Perawan).

== Filmography ==
During his more than thirty-year career, Poniman appeared in almost forty films.

- Kedok Ketawa (1940)
- Zoebaida (1940)
- Pantjawarna (1941)
- Air Mata Iboe (1941)
- Dunia Gila (1951)
- Pahlawan (1951)
- Rumah Hantu (1951)
- Apa Salahku (1952)
- Pahit-Pahit Manis (1952)
- KM - 49 (1952)
- Siapa Dia (1952)
- Solo Di Waktu Malam (1952)
- Guga Guli (1953)
- Putri Solo (1953)
- Kisah Tudjuh Bidadari (1953)
- Lenggang Djakarta (1953)
- Musafir Kelana (1953)
- Djakarta Diwaktu Malam (1954)
- Djandjiku Djandjimu (1954)
- Konde Tjioda (1954)
- Mertua Sinting (1954)
- Sebatang Kara (1954)
- Sedarah Sedaging (1954)
- Kebon Binatang (1955)
- Malam Minggu (1955)
- Masuk Kampung Keluar Kampung (1955)
- Setulus Hatiku (1955)
- Radja Karet dari Singapura (1956)
- Salah Pilih (1956)
- Teladan (1957)
- Momon (1959)
- Aku Hanja Bajangan (1963)
- Generasi Baru (1963)
- Lembah Hidjau (1963)
- Sisa-sisa Laskar Pajang (1972)
- Aku Mau Hidup (1974)
- Putri Solo (1974)
- Rahasia Perawan (1975)
- Bunga Roos dari Cikembang (1975)

== Works cited ==
- Banoe, Pono (2003). Kamus Musik [Dictionary of Music] (in Indonesian). Yogyakarta: Kanisius. ISBN 978-979-497-338-7.
- Biran, Misbach Yusa, ed. (1979). Apa Siapa Orang Film Indonesia 1926–1978 [What and Who: Film Figures in Indonesia, 1926–1978]. Jakarta: Sinematek Indonesia. OCLC 6655859.
- Biran, Misbach Yusa (2009). Sejarah Film 1900–1950: Bikin Film di Jawa [History of Film 1900–1950: Making Films in Java] (in Indonesian). Komunitas Bamboo working with the Jakarta Art Council. ISBN 978-979-3731-58-2.
- "Filmografi S Poniman" [S Poniman Filmography]. filmindonesia.or.id (in Indonesian). Konfiden Foundation. Archived from the original on 6 March 2016.
