= Sutan Usman Karim =

Sutan Usman Karim was an East Indies (now Indonesia) film director, screenwriter and a diplomat. He was famous as one of two main directors of the film production company Oriental Film, the other being Njoo Cheong Seng. The company was based in Batavia (now Jakarta) and had been established by ethnic Chinese businessman Tjo Seng Han in 1940.

Sutan Usman Karim and Njoo Cheong Seng were instrumental in launching the careers of actors such as Dhalia and Soerip. In 1941, Sutan Usman Karim directed Panggilan Darah the fourth and last of a series black-and-white films for Oriental Film starring Dhalia and Soerip before the company was shut down. Panggilan Darah was screened in theatres in the West Indies as late as August 1952, but may now be lost.
