= Ratna Moetoe Manikam =

Dutch East Indies film

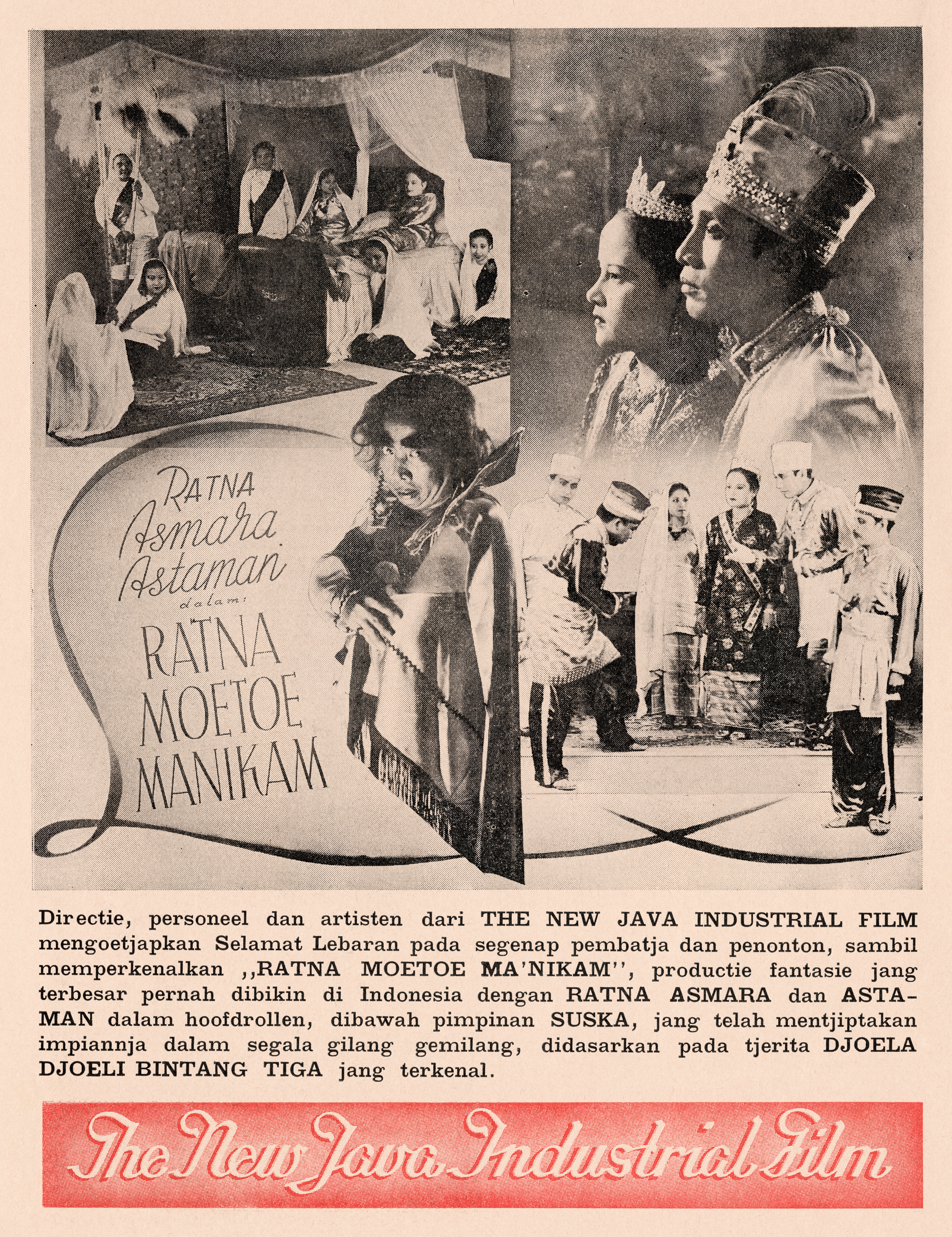
Advertisement in the magazine Poestaka Timoer, October 1941

Ratna Moetoe Manikam (Perfected Spelling: Ratna Mutu Manikam), also known by the title Djoela Djoeli Bintang Tiga (Dance of the Three Stars; Perfected Spelling: Jula Juli Bintang Tiga), is a film from the Dutch East Indies (now Indonesia).

== Plot ==
Sultan Darsjah Alam (Astaman) is the beloved leader of a prosperous eastern kingdom. The sultans of neighbouring kingdoms, jealous of this prosperity, connive and conspire to cause his downfall. However, Darsjah Alam remains focused on his own kingdom and is protected by a magical ring. However, prophecy foretells that, if the ring is lost, disaster will strike.

In the heavens live three goddesses, the sisters Laila Kesoema, Koemala Djoewita, and Ratna Moetoe Manikam (Ratna Asmara). Though Ratna and Laila get along well and want only to bring blessings to the earth, the brash Koemala has different intentions. Ratna and Koemala soon come into conflict over Darsjah Alam. Koemala attempts to woo Darsjah Alam, who – sensing that she does not love him – rejects her advances. In response, Koemala plots to send demons and jinns to destroy his kingdom. Laila overhears Koemala's scheming and tells Ratna, who in turn consults the elder god Batara Guru. He refuses to intervene, instead saying that Koemala's attack would be a test of Darsjah Alam's faith.

On Earth, Darsjah Alam is playing sepak raga in his courtyard when his ring is pulled off his finger by an unseen force. Shocked by this event, Darsjah Alam goes to the lakeside to meditate whilst the minister and palace staff chase after his ring. Upon arriving, Darsjah Alam sees a swan and hears a disembodied voice tell him to take it by the mouth. When he does so, the swan transforms into Ratna, who returns the sultan's ring and offers herself as his bride, should he accept her three conditions: he may not ask her name, origin, or lineage. Darsjah Alam agrees, and the two are married.

A year passes, and Darsjah Alam and Ratna have their first son, Bahroel Alam. As the kingdom prepares for an enormous celebration, Koemala – jealous of her sister's happy life – plans to disrupt the festivities. She transforms one of her servants into a human sultan named Indraboemi, who travels to the palace with his entourage. He spreads discord among the royal guests and palace staff; as the son of the sultan and an unknown woman, he says, Bahroel Alam lacks the heritage to be a proper sultan.

After the guests leave, Darsjah Alam goes to Ratna and asks who she is and where she came from. Ratna takes him to the lakeside, where she answers his questions then disappears. Darsjah Alam is soon taken to the land of the jinns, where Koemala takes him and casts him into a fire, turning him into a sheep. Indraboemi, meanwhile, is sent back to the palace to reign in Darsjah Alam's place. As his first act, he has a minister take Bahroel Alam away.

On his journey abroad, the minister meets Laila, who is passing as a human woman. They live in the forest for eighteen years, raising Bahroel Alam as if he were a poor boy. One day, while searching for fruit, Bahroel Alam discovers an overgrown palace, where he meets an old woman. She tells him that he is the son of the true sultan and sends him on his way, giving him an arrow in parting. Upon arriving home, Bahroel Alam throws the arrow at a passing sheep, having been overcome with a sudden urge. The sheep transforms into a dead Darsjah Alam. The old woman whom Bahroel Alam had met earlier comes and sprinkles flower petals over his body, bringing him back in life. The old woman then reveals herself as Ratna and says that the people are again in need of Darsjah Alam.

Laila, having returned to the heavens, rains down an army to help Bahroel Alam take control of the palace. Upon their arrival, Indraboemi flies into the sky to escape, higher than Bahroel Alam can fire his arrows. Ratna thus grants the young man the power of flight, allowing him to chase after Indraboemi and slay him. Meanwhile, in the heavens, Laila fights and defeats Koemala. Darsjah Alam is reinstated as sultan to much rejoicing.

== Production ==
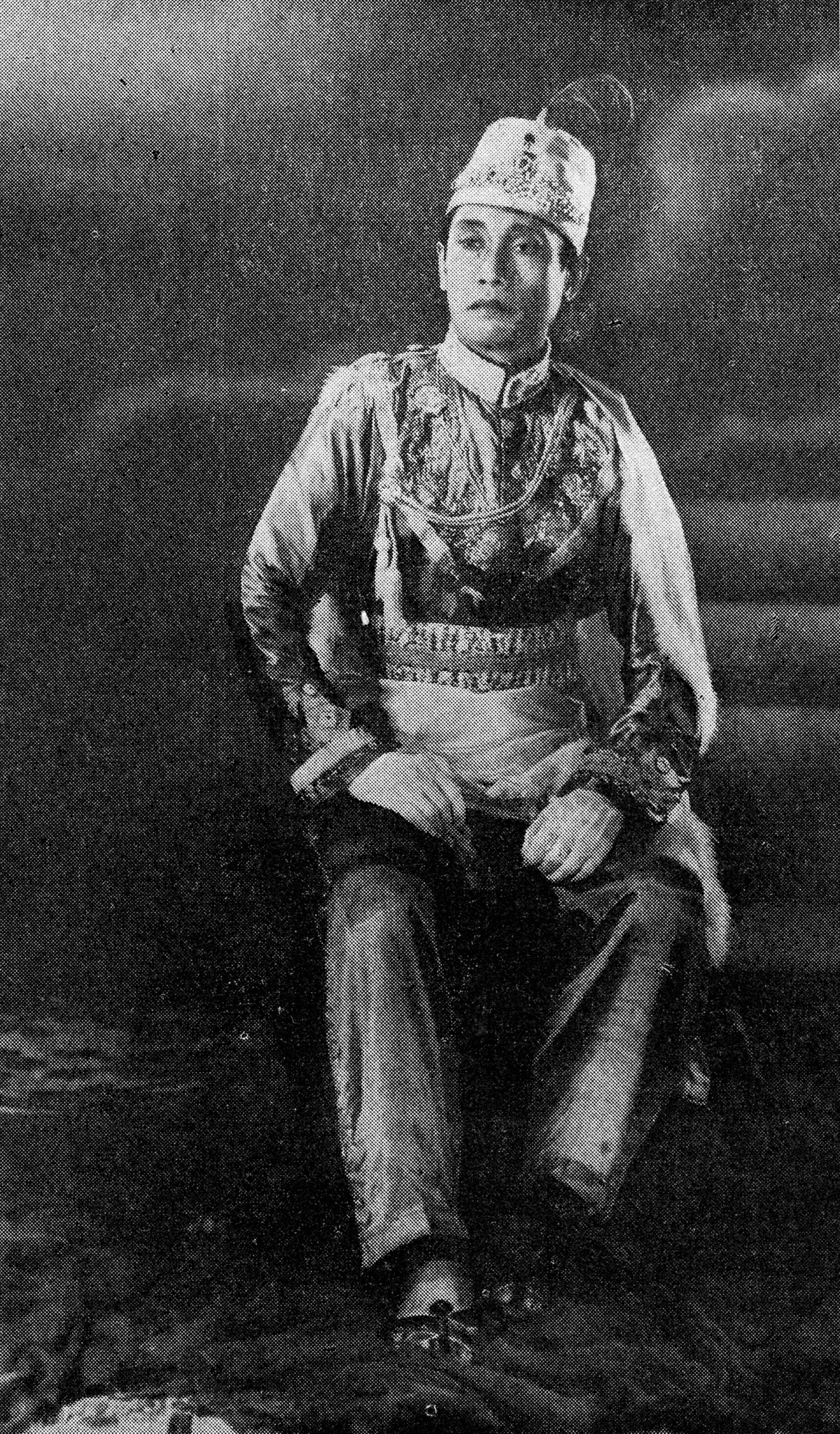
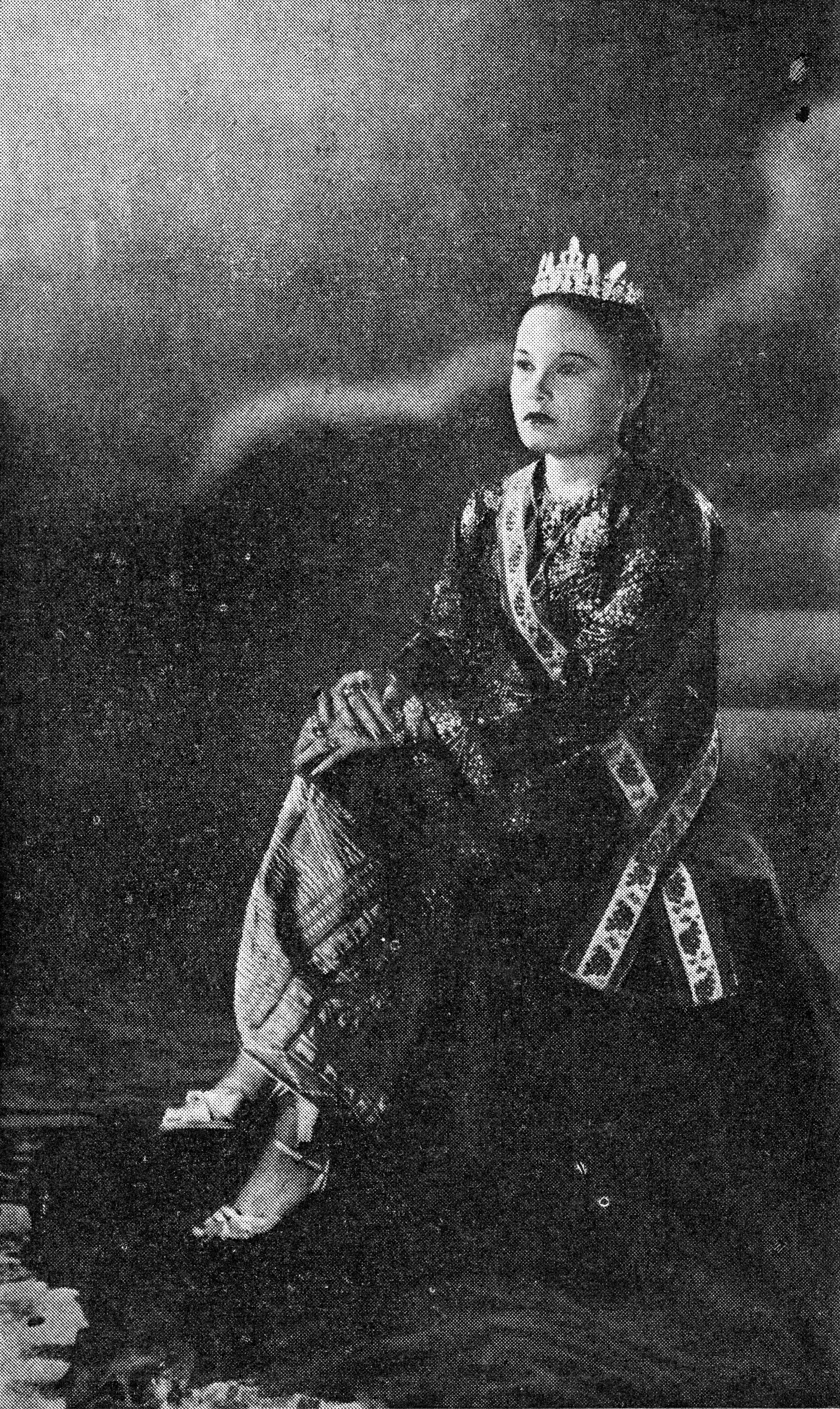
Astaman (left) and Ratna Asmara, the leads of Ratna Moetoe Manikam

Ratna Moetoe Manikam was directed by Sutan Usman Karim, under the pseudonym Suska. He had worked as an editor for the Padang-based daily Persamaan, and had directed Panggilan Darah (1941) for Oriental Film before joining The Teng Chun's New Java Industrial Film (JIF). The's company produced the film Ratna Moetoe Manikam. Inspired by the success of The Thief of Bagdad (1940), Suska realised that a modernised version of a classic story could be successful. He therefore adapted the plot for Ratna Moetoe Manikam from a stage drama entitled Djoela Djoeli Bintang Tiga, a staple of stamboel stage performances.

The film starred Ratna Asmara, Astaman, Ali Joego, and Inoe Perbatasari. Ratna Asmara and Astaman shot their roles film concurrently with Andjar Asmara's Noesa Penida. Hajopan Bajo Angin handled artistic direction.

== Release ==
According to director Tan Tjoei Hock, filming was interrupted by the Japanese occupation in early 1942; the Japanese forces closed all local production houses, including New JIF. Tan reportedly finished filming the work by order of the Japanese overlords. The Indonesian film historian Misbach Yusa Biran writes that it was released during the occupation, which lasted until 1945, but he does not specify a year.

The film is likely lost. The American visual anthropologist Karl G. Heider writes that all Indonesian films from before 1950 are lost. However, JB Kristanto's Katalog Film Indonesia (Indonesian Film Catalogue) records several as having survived at Sinematek Indonesia's archives, and Biran writes that several Japanese propaganda films have survived at the Netherlands Government Information Service.

== Works cited ==
- Asmara, Andjar (15 October 1941). "Ratna Moetoe Manikam". Poestaka Timoer (in Indonesian) (66). Yogyakarta: 34–36.
- Biran, Misbach Yusa (2009). Sejarah Film 1900–1950: Bikin Film di Jawa [History of Film 1900–1950: Making Films in Java] (in Indonesian). Jakarta: Komunitas Bamboo working with the Jakarta Art Council. ISBN 978-979-3731-58-2.
- Heider, Karl G (1991). Indonesian Cinema: National Culture on Screen. Honolulu: University of Hawaii Press. ISBN 978-0-8248-1367-3.
- "Ratna Moetoe Manikam (Djoela Djoeli Bintang Tiga)". filmindonesia.or.id. Jakarta: Konfiden Foundation. Archived from the original on 2 December 2013.
- "Ratna Moetoe Manikam (Djoela Djoeli Bintang Tiga) | Kredit" [Ratna Moetoe Manikam (Djoela Djoeli Bintang Tiga) | Credits]. filmindonesia.or.id. Jakarta: Konfiden Foundation. Archived from the original on 21 October 2016.
