= Poetri Rimba =

- Directed by: Inoe Perbatasari
- Screenplay by: Soeska
- Produced by: The Teng Chun
- Starring: Aisjah; Loedi; Ali Joego; Bissu
- Production company: Jacatra Film
- Release date: 1941 (Dutch East Indies)
- Country: Dutch East Indies
- Language: Indonesian

Poetri Rimba ([puˈtri rɪmˈba]; Perfected Spelling Putri Rimba; Indonesian for Jungle Princess) is a 1941 film from the Dutch East Indies (present-day Indonesia) which was directed by Inoe Perbatasari and produced by The Teng Chun for Jacatra Film. A love story, it tells of a man who rescues a woman from a gang of thieves and escapes through the jungle.

== Plot ==
Achmad and his group go hunting on an island. After they are separated, Achmad wanders through the island's dense jungles until he is ultimately captured by a gang of bandits under the warlord Kumis Panjang and his right-hand man Perbada. As Perbada prepares to burn Achmad alive, it is revealed that Achmad had once saved Kumis Panjang's daughter, Bidasari, from death; as a result, he is not executed. Although Bidasari is betrothed to Perbada, she and Achmad begin falling in love. In a rage, Perbada captures Kumis Panjang and Bidasari, who are eventually rescued by Achmad.

== Production ==
Poetri Rimba was produced by The Teng Chun for the Jacatra Film Company, a subsidiary of his Java Industrial Film. It was directed by former journalist Inoe Perbatasari, who had made his directorial debut earlier in 1941 with Elang Darat (Land Hawk). Soeska handled screenwriting duties, basing his story on the popular Tarzan films.

The black-and-white film starred Aisjah, Loedi, Ali Joego, Bissu, and Soetiati. Overall its formula was similar to other contemporary films: kroncong songs, action, and romance.

== Release ==
Poetri Rimba was released in 1941. It was Perbatasari's last film for Jacatra, although he later directed another three works for other companies.

The film is likely lost. The American visual anthropologist Karl G. Heider writes that all Indonesian films from before 1950 are lost. However, JB Kristanto's Katalog Film Indonesia (Indonesian Film Catalogue) records several as having survived at Sinematek Indonesia's archives, and film historian Misbach Yusa Biran writes that several Japanese propaganda films have survived at the Netherlands Government Information Service.

== Works cited ==
- Biran, Misbach Yusa (2009). Sejarah Film 1900–1950: Bikin Film di Jawa [History of Film 1900–1950: Making Films in Java] (in Indonesian). Jakarta: Komunitas Bamboo working with the Jakarta Art Council. ISBN 978-979-3731-58-2.
- Heider, Karl G (1991). Indonesian Cinema: National Culture on Screen. Honolulu: University of Hawaii Press. ISBN 978-0-8248-1367-3.
- "Inoe Perbatasari | Filmografi" [Inoe Perbatasari | Filmography]. filmindonesia.or.id (in Indonesian). Jakarta: Konfidan Foundation. Archived from the original on 16 April 2014.
- "Poetri Rimba". filmindonesia.or.id (in Indonesian). Jakarta: Konfiden Foundation. Archived from the original on 2 December 2013.
- Said, Salim (1982). Profil Dunia Film Indonesia [Profile of Indonesian Cinema] (in Indonesian). Jakarta: Grafiti Pers. OCLC 9507803.
