= Pantjawarna =

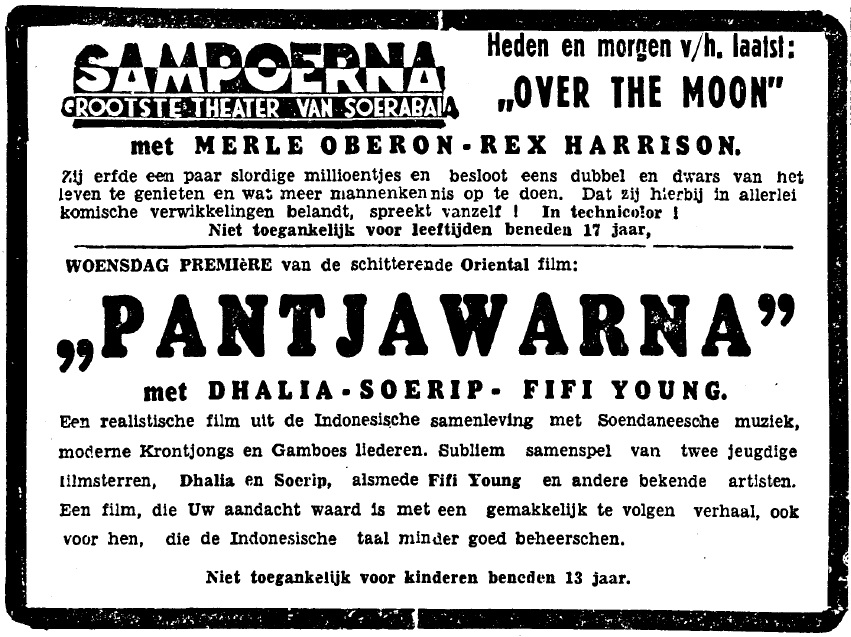
- Newspaper advertisement
- Directed by: Njoo Cheong Seng
- Produced by: Tjho Seng Han
- Starring: Fifi Young; Dhalia; Soerip
- Production company: Oriental Film
- Release date: March 1941 (Dutch East Indies)
- Country: Dutch East Indies
- Language: Indonesian

Pantjawarna (Perfected Spelling: Pancawarna; Indonesian for Five Colours) is a 1941 film from the Dutch East Indies (now Indonesia).

== Plot ==
A young woman must raise her two daughters, despite several hardships, while her husband is in prison. She is ultimately taken in by the nobleman Raden Gatot, and the two fall in love. After she divorces her former husband, she and Gatot are married. Her former husband, however, upon release from prison, decides to challenge Gatot. Later in the film the mother must choose a good suitor for her daughters.

== Production ==
Pantjawarna was produced by Tjho Seng Han and directed by Njoo Cheong Seng for Oriental Film. Njoo had worked for the company since 1940, when he and his wife Fifi Young were signed to produce Kris Mataram.

The film had twelve songs, including works in the kroncong, gambus, and Sundanese styles; for this, it has been called the first musical film in the Dutch East Indies. It starred Young, Mochtar Widjaja, Dhalia, Idris Martha, Omar Rodriga, S Poniman, Siti Aminah, Iyem Cilacap, and Soerip.

== Release and reception ==
Pantjawarna was released by March 1941, and rated for viewers over the age of 13. One reviewer, in the Soerabaijasch Handelsblad, described the film as excellent, with good humour and strong dramatic elements; praise was directed in particular to the film's technical aspects and the performances of Dhalia and Young. Another, in the Bataviaasch Nieuwsblad, praised Young's acting.

It was Njoo's last film for Oriental; he and Young migrated to Majestic Film soon afterwards. Oriental closed later in 1941, after releasing a final film, Panggilan Darah (Call of Blood). This film featured Dhalia and Soerip in starring roles, as orphaned sisters who tried to make a living in the colonial capital of Batavia (now Jakarta), and also featured Poniman and Mochtar Widjaja; Only the last of these left the film industry following Oriental's demise; Dhalia, Soerip, and Poniman remained active for several decades.

The film is likely lost. As elsewhere in the world at the time, movies in the Indies were shot on highly flammable nitrate film, and after a fire destroyed much of Produksi Film Negara's warehouse in 1952, old films shot on nitrate were deliberately destroyed. As such, American visual anthropologist Karl G. Heider suggests that all Indonesian films from before 1950 are lost. However, JB Kristanto's Katalog Film Indonesia (Indonesian Film Catalogue) records several as having survived at Sinematek Indonesia's archives, and film historian Misbach Yusa Biran writes that several Japanese propaganda films have survived at the Netherlands Government Information Service.

== Works cited ==
- Biran, Misbach Yusa (2009). Sejarah Film 1900–1950: Bikin Film di Jawa [History of Film 1900–1950: Making Films in Java] (in Indonesian). Jakarta: Komunitas Bamboo working with the Jakarta Art Council. ISBN 978-979-3731-58-2.
- Biran, Misbach Yusa (2012). "Film di Masa Kolonial" [Film in the Colonial Period]. Indonesia dalam Arus Sejarah: Masa Pergerakan Kebangsaan [Indonesia in the Flow of Time: The Nationalist Movement] (in Indonesian). Vol. V. Ministry of Education and Culture. pp. 268–93. ISBN 978-979-9226-97-6.
- Heider, Karl G (1991). Indonesian Cinema: National Culture on Screen. Honolulu: University of Hawaii Press. ISBN 978-0-8248-1367-3.
- "Filmografi Dhalia" [Filmography for Dhalia]. filmindonesia.or.id (in Indonesian). Jakarta: Konfiden Foundation. Archived from the original on 6 March 2014.
- "Filmografi Mochtar Widjaja" [Filmography for Mochtar Widjaja]. filmindonesia.or.id (in Indonesian). Jakarta: Konfiden Foundation. Archived from the original on 6 March 2014.
- "Filmografi S Poniman" [Filmography for S Poniman]. filmindonesia.or.id (in Indonesian). Jakarta: Konfiden Foundation. Archived from the original on 6 March 2014.
- "Filmografi Soerip" [Filmography for Soerip]. filmindonesia.or.id (in Indonesian). Jakarta: Konfiden Foundation. Archived from the original on 3 February 2014.
- "Panggilan Darah". filmindonesia.or.id (in Indonesian). Jakarta: Konfiden Foundation. Archived from the original on 2 December 2013.
- "Pantjawarna". filmindonesia.or.id (in Indonesian). Jakarta: Konfiden Foundation. Archived from the original on 2 December 2013.
- "Rex: Pantjawarna". Bataviaasch Nieuwsblad (in Dutch). Batavia. 19 March 1941. p. 5.
- "Sampoerna: Pantjawarna". Soerabaijasch Handelsblad (in Dutch). Surabaya. 27 March 1941. p. 6.
- "(untitled)". Soerabaijasch Handelsblad (in Dutch). Surabaya. 24 March 1941. p. 4.
