= Dhalia =

Indonesian actress (1925–1991)

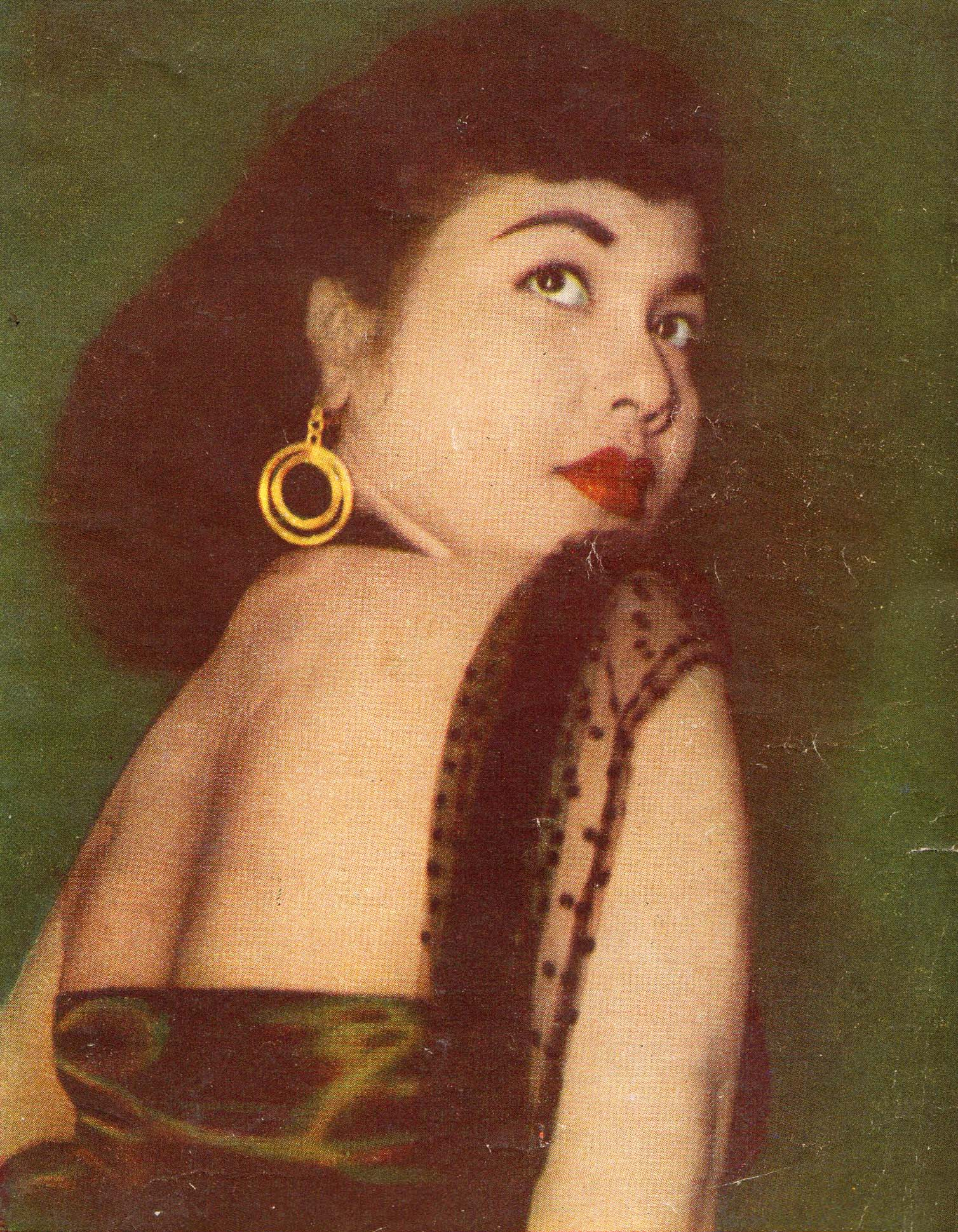
- Dhalia in 1954
- Born: 10 February 1925; Medan, Dutch East Indies
- Died: 14 April 1991 (aged 66); Jakarta, Indonesia
- Occupation: Actress
- Years active: 1937–1991
- Spouses: Raden Djumadi Armansyah (m. 1949, died): Joebaar Ajoeb
- Children: 1
- Awards: Citra Award (1955)

Dhalia (Perfected Spelling: Dahlia; 10 February 1925 – 14 April 1991) was an Indonesian actress active for over fifty years. She was nominated for three Citra Awards at the Indonesian Film Festival, winning one. She was the part of Classical Indonesian cinema.

== Early life and education ==
Dhalia was born on 10 February 1925 in Medan, Dutch East Indies, as the only child of Tengku Katam and Karang Intan. Her father was a stagewriter from Medan, who named his theatrical troupe Dhalia Opera after her. While her mother, was a stage actress and dancer.

When she was a child, her mother died in Tuban. Dhalia spends her formal education studied at a Muhammadiyah-run elementary school then at a Muhammadiyah-run junior high school. In her spare time she focused on acting for her father's troupe. By the 1940s she was already recognised for her singing prowess, although her father intended for her to continue her studies in Islam at Al-Azhar University, Cairo.

=== Illness and death ===
Dhalia was diagnosed with cervical cancer, and spent her last day at her rented house in Menteng, Central Jakarta, along with her daughter and granddaughter. She died there on 14 April 1991, at the age of 66.

== Career ==
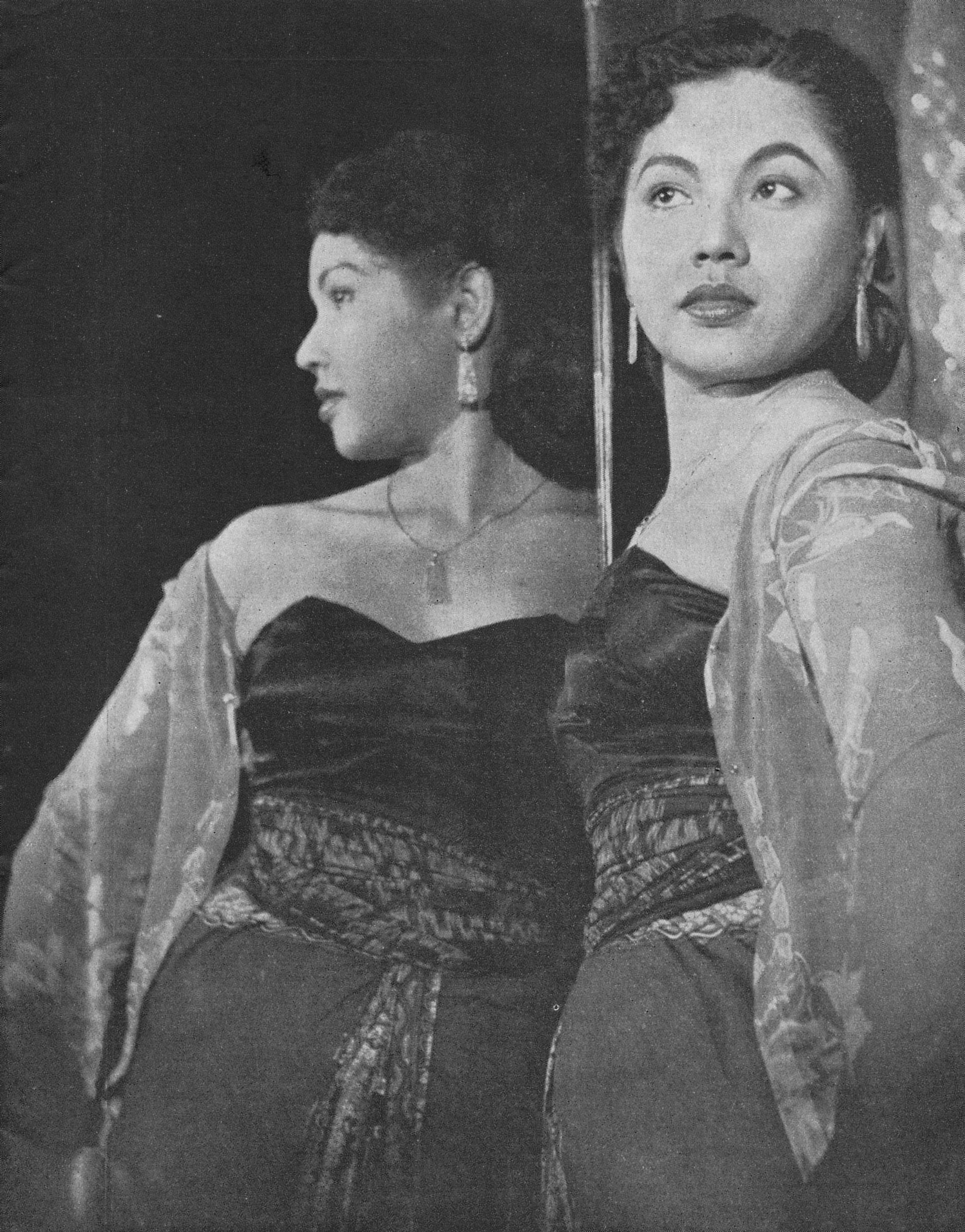
Dhalia as Laila in Lewat Djam Malam (1954)

Dhalia started her film career by starred in Terang Boelan (1937), as a supporting role. In 1941, she made her feature film debut in Njoo Cheong Seng's musical Pantjawarna, produced by Oriental Film. Her next two appearances saw her playing an orphan in Sutan Usman Karim's drama Panggilan Darah and alongside Rd Mochtar in Moestika dari Djemar, an adaptation of the One Thousand and One Nights. Dhalia's last two films before Indonesia's independence were completed during the Japanese occupation (1942–45): Berdjoang and Hoedjan. Both were works of pro-Japanese propaganda.

During the Indonesian National Revolution (1945–1949), film production almost stopped. Dhalia only returned to the screen in 1952, completing three films that year. By 1955 she had completed eighteen films, taking such roles as the title character in Chandra Dewi (1952) and the prostitute Laila in Lewat Djam Malam (1954). Between 1956 and 1972 Dhalia made no films. After she returned to the industry, she was no longer offered leading roles, instead taking supporting roles. She made her last film in 1990, with the 1980s as the most productive period in her career.

== Awards ==
During her career Dhalia was nominated for three Citra Awards. Her first nomination, in 1955, was for the film Lewat Djam Malam; she won the Citra Award for Best Leading Actress for that performance. In 1981 and 1982 she received two nominations for the Citra Award for Best Supporting Actress, for the films Usia 18 and Bukan Istri Pilihan, respectively.

== Filmography ==
During her fifty-four year career Dhalia acted in some fifty-three films.

- Terang Boelan (1937)
- Pantjawarna (1941)
- Panggilan Darah (1941)
- Moestika dari Djemar (1941)
- Boenga Sembodja (1942)
- Berdjoang (1943)
- Hoedjan (1944)
- Sangkar Emas (1952)
- Chandra Dewi (1952)
- Sorga Terakhir (1952)
- Halilintar (1954)
- Antara Dua Sorga (1954)
- Kopral Djono (1954)
- Lewat Djam Malam (1954)
- Kabut Desember (1955)
- Peristiwa Didanau Toba (1955)
- Last Tango in Jakarta (1973)
- Cinta Putih (Bidan Aminah) (1977)
- M-5 (Menantang Maut) (1978)
- Sepasang Merpati (1979)
- Usia 18 (1980)
- Mawar Jingga (1981)
- Bukan Istri Pilihan (1981)
- Ajian Macan Putih (1982)
- Halimun (1982)
- Warok Singo Kobra (1982)
- Mereka Memang Ada (1982)
- Sorta (Tumbuh Bunga di Sela Batu) (1982)
- Ratu Buaya (1983)
- Darah dan Mahkota Ronggeng (1983)
- Bercinta dalam Badai (1984)
- Kerikil-Kerikil Tajam (1984)
- Saat-Saat Kau Berbaring di Dadaku (1984)
- Titik-Titik Noda (1984)
- Secangkir Kopi Pahit (1984)
- Arie Hanggara (1985)
- Pertunangan (1985)
- Cinta di Awal Tigapuluh (1985)
- Gadis Hitam Putih (1985)
- Perceraian (1985)
- Satria Bambu Kuning (1985)
- Kemilau Cinta di Langit Jingga (1985)
- Telaga Air Mata (1986)
- Yang Perkasa (1986)
- Pernikahan Dini (1987)
- Aku Benci Kamu (1987)
- Pernikahan Berdarah (1987)
- Sumpah Keramat (Sumpah Pocong Lintang dan Bayu) (1988)
- Jodoh Boleh Diatur (1988)
- Nuansa Birunya Rinjani (1989)
- Joe Turun ke Desa (1989)
- Pendekar Jagad Kelana (1990)
- Ketika Dia Pergi (1990)

== Works cited ==
- Biran, Misbach Yusa, ed. (1979). Apa Siapa Orang Film Indonesia 1926–1978 [What and Who: Film Figures in Indonesia, 1926–1978]. Sinematek Indonesia. OCLC 6655859.
- Biran, Misbach Yusa (2009). Sejarah Film 1900–1950: Bikin Film di Jawa [History of Film 1900–1950: Making Films in Java] (in Indonesian). Jakarta: Komunitas Bamboo working with the Jakarta Art Council. ISBN 978-979-3731-58-2.
- "Dhalia". filmindonesia.or.id (in Indonesian). Konfiden Foundation. Archived from the original on 18 July 2014.
- "Filmografi Dhalia" [Filmography for Dhalia]. filmindonesia.or.id (in Indonesian). Konfiden Foundation. Archived from the original on 6 March 2014.
- "Moestika dari Djenar". filmindonesia.or.id (in Indonesian). Jakarta: Konfiden Foundation. Archived from the original on 2 December 2013.
- "Panggilan Darah". filmindonesia.or.id (in Indonesian). Jakarta: Konfiden Foundation. Archived from the original on 2 December 2013.
- "Penghargaan Dhalia" [Awards for Dhalia]. filmindonesia.or.id (in Indonesian). Konfiden Foundation. Archived from the original on 27 August 2015.
- Tjasmadi, Muhammad Johan, ed. (1983). Indonesian Film Festival Information. Jakarta: Indonesian Film Festival. p. 342.
