= Gagak Item =

1939 film from the Dutch East Indies directed by Wong brothers

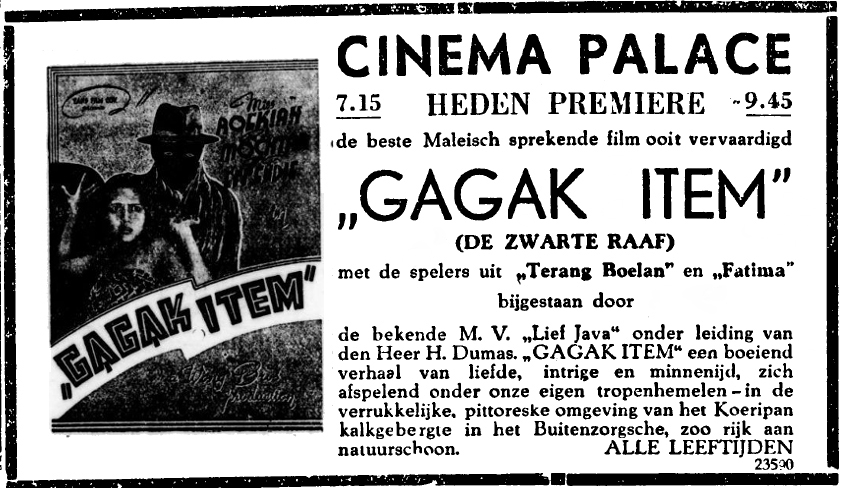
- Newspaper advertisement
- Directed by: Joshua Wong; Othniel Wong
- Screenplay by: Saeroen
- Produced by: Tan Khoen Yauw
- Starring: Rd Mochtar; Roekiah; Eddy T. Effendi
- Cinematography: Wong brothers
- Music by: H. Dumas
- Production company: Tan's Film
- Release date: 1939 (Dutch East Indies)
- Country: Dutch East Indies
- Language: Vernacular Malay

Gagak Item ([ɡaˈɡaʔ iˈtəm]; Vernacular Malay for Black Raven, also known by the Dutch title De Zwarte Raaf) is a 1939 bandit film from the Dutch East Indies (now Indonesia) directed by Joshua and Othniel Wong for Tan's Film. Starring Rd Mochtar, Roekiah, and Eddy T. Effendi, it follows a masked man known only as "Gagak Item" ("Black Raven"). The black-and-white film, which featured the cast and crew from the 1937 hit Terang Boelan (Full Moon), was a commercial success and received positive reviews upon release. It is likely lost.

== Production ==
Gagak Item was directed by brothers Joshua and Othniel Wong; filming the work in black-and-white, they also handled sound editing. It was produced by Tan Khoen Yauw of Tan's Film and starred Rd Mochtar, Roekiah, Eddy T. Effendi, and Kartolo. The Wongs and cast had first worked together on Albert Balink's 1937 blockbuster Terang Boelan (Full Moon), before joining Tan's Film in 1938 for the highly successful Fatima; Gagak Item was their second production with the company, which hoped to mirror Terang Boelan's success. Through these prior films Mochtar and Roekiah had become an established screen couple.

Saeroen, a journalist-turned-screenwriter for Terang Boelan and Fatima, returned to write the script to Gagak Item. The film, a love story, followed a girl and a masked man known as "Gagak Item" ("Black Raven") and was set in rural Buitenzorg (now Bogor). (Note: Biran (2009, pp. 175–176) only provides a single sentence describing Gagak Item's plot. The film's entry in the Indonesian Film Database (Filmindonesia.or.id, Gagak Item) does not include a plot summary and available contemporary reviews do not give any further details. The novelisation is not held in any of the libraries searchable through WorldCat.) The titular bandit was similar to Zorro, a character popular in the Indies at the time; such figures had been a staple of travelling theatre troupes beginning in the early 1930s. When writing the script Saeroen continued the formula he had used in Terang Boelan, including action, music, beautiful vistas and physical comedy. The film had six songs performed by Hugo Dumas' musical troupe Lief Java; the troupe was known for its keroncong performances, mixing traditional music with Portuguese influences. Gagak Item featured vocals by kroncong singer Annie Landouw.

== Release and reception ==
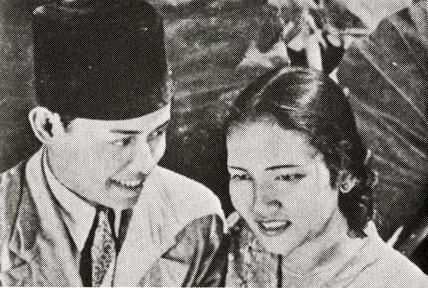
Rd Mochtar and Roekiah in a promotional still

Gagak Item was released in late 1939 and was screened in Batavia (now Jakarta), the capital of the Indies; Medan, Northern Sumatra; and Surabaya, Eastern Java. Some screenings of the film, also advertised under the Dutch title De Zwarte Raaf, had Dutch-language subtitles. (Note: At the time the Indies was a colony of the Netherlands. Dutch audiences would sometimes watch local films.) A novelisation of the film, published by the Yogyakarta-based Kolff-Buning, soon followed. Gagak Item was one of four domestic productions released in 1939; the film industry had undergone a significant downturn following the onset of the Great Depression, during which time cinemas mainly showed Hollywood productions, and had only begun recovering following the release of Terang Boelan.

Gagak Item was a commercial and critical success, although not as much as Tan's earlier production. An anonymous review in Bataviaasch Nieuwsblad praised the film, especially its music. The reviewer opined that the film would be a great success and that the film industry in the Indies was showing promising developments. Another review in the same paper found that, although "one may shake one's head over the cultural value of indigenous films", (Note: Original: "Al mag men dan het hoofd schudden over de cultureele waarde van de Inheemsche film op het huidige tijdstip, ...") the film was a step forward for the industry. The review praised Roekiah's "demure" (Note: Original: "ingetogen") acting.

Following the success of Gagak Item the Wongs, Saeroen, Roekiah, and Mochtar continued to work with Tan's Film. Their next production, Siti Akbari (1940), was similarly successful, although again not as profitable as Terang Boelan or Fatima. Saeroen, Joshua Wong, and Mochtar left the company in 1940: Wong and Mochtar after payment disputes, and Saeroen to return to journalism. Through 1941 Tan's Film produced fewer movies than its competitors, and was ultimately shut down following the Japanese occupation in early 1942.

Gagak Item was screened as late as January 1951. The film is likely lost. In common with the rest of the world, movies in the Indies were then shot using highly flammable nitrate film, and after a fire destroyed much of Produksi Film Negara's warehouse in 1952, old Indies films shot on nitrate were deliberately destroyed. The American visual anthropologist Karl G. Heider writes that all Indonesian films from before 1950 are lost. However, JB Kristanto's Katalog Film Indonesia (Indonesian Film Catalogue) records several as having survived at Sinematek Indonesia's archives, and film historian Misbach Yusa Biran writes that several Japanese propaganda films have survived at the Netherlands Government Information Service.

== Works cited ==
- "Agenda: Vrijdag 26 Januari, Bogor" [Agenda: Friday 26 January, Bogor]. De Nieuwsgier (in Dutch). Jakarta. 26 January 1951. p. 6. Archived from the original on 12 August 2023.
- Biran, Misbach Yusa (2009). Sejarah Film 1900–1950: Bikin Film di Jawa [History of Film 1900–1950: Making Films in Java] (in Indonesian). Jakarta: Komunitas Bamboo working with the Jakarta Art Council. ISBN 978-979-3731-58-2.
- Biran, Misbach Yusa (2012). "Film di Masa Kolonial" [Film in the Colonial Period]. Indonesia dalam Arus Sejarah: Masa Pergerakan Kebangsaan [Indonesia in the Flow of Time: The Nationalist Movement] (in Indonesian). Vol. V. Ministry of Education and Culture. pp. 268–93. ISBN 978-979-9226-97-6.
- "Filmaankondiging Cinema Palace: 'Gagak Item'" [Film Review, Cinema Palace: 'Gagak Item']. Bataviaasch Nieuwsblad (in Dutch). Batavia: Kolff & Co. 21 December 1939. p. 12. Archived from the original on 30 December 2013.
- "Filmniews. Sampoerna: 'De zwarte raaf'" [Film News. Sampoerna: 'De Zwarte Raaf']. De Indische Courant (in Dutch). Surabaya. 27 November 1939. p. 12.
- "Gagak Item". Bataviaasch Nieuwsblad (in Dutch). Batavia: Kolff & Co. 19 December 1939. p. 3. Archived from the original on 6 January 2014.
- "Gagak Item". filmindonesia.or.id. Jakarta: Konfiden Foundation. Archived from the original on 2 January 2014.
- Heider, Karl G (1991). Indonesian Cinema: National Culture on Screen. Honolulu: University of Hawaii Press. ISBN 978-0-8248-1367-3.
- "(untitled)". Bataviaasch Nieuwsblad (in Dutch). Batavia: Kolff & Co. 16 November 1939. p. 6.
- "(untitled)". De Sumatra Post (in Dutch). Medan: J. Hallermann. 11 November 1939. p. 8.
- "(untitled)". Het Nieuws van den dag voor Nederlandsch-Indië (in Dutch). Batavia: Kolff & Co. 8 May 1939. p. 10.
