= Sorga Ka Toedjoe =

1940 film

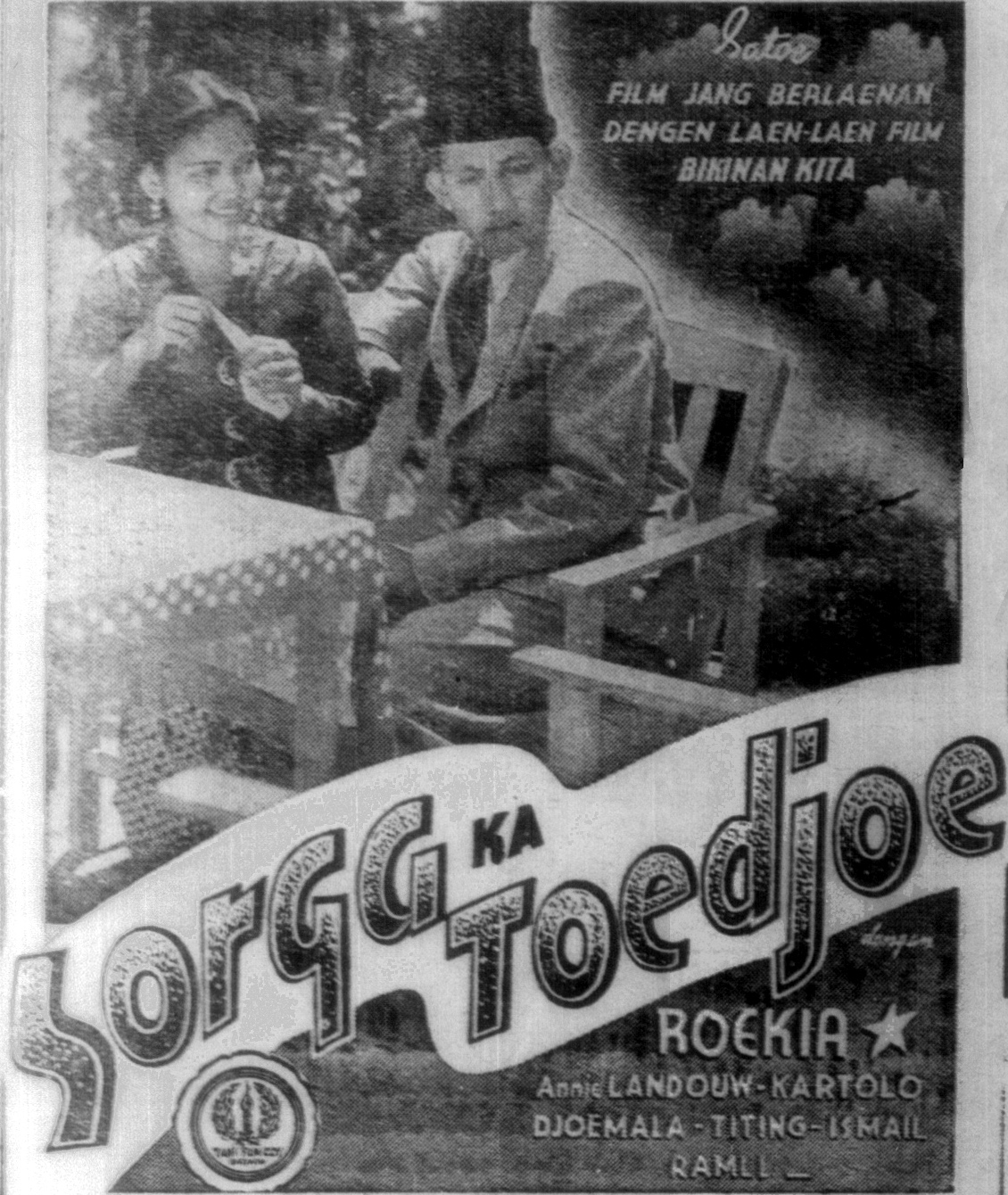
- Newspaper advertisement
- Directed by: Joshua Wong; Othniel Wong
- Starring: Roekiah; Djoemala; Annie Landouw; Kartolo
- Music by: Kartolo
- Production company: Tan's Film
- Release date: 1940 (Dutch East Indies)
- Country: Dutch East Indies
- Language: Indonesian

Sorga Ka Toedjoe (Note: Sources, both contemporary and modern, give a variety of spellings, including Sorga Katoedjoe, Sorga Ketoedjoe, and Sorga Ke Toedjoe. The novelisation is likewise not consistent in its spelling.) ([ˈsɔrɡa kə ˈtudʒu]; vernacular Malay for Seventh Heaven; also advertised under the Dutch title In Den Zevenden Hemel) is a 1940 film from the Dutch East Indies (present-day Indonesia) directed by Joshua and Othniel Wong for Tan's Film. It follows an older couple (Kartolo and Annie Landouw) who are reunited by another, younger couple (Roekiah and Djoemala) after years of separation. The black-and-white film, the first production by Tan's Film after the departure of Rd Mochtar, featured kroncong music and was targeted at lower-class native audiences. It was a commercial and critical success. Roekiah and Djoemala took leading roles in three more films before Tan's closed in 1942. Sorga Ka Toedjoe is now thought lost.

== Plot ==
Rasminah (Roekiah) is living with her blind aunt Hadidjah (Annie Landouw) in Puncak, a village south-east of Buitenzorg (now Bogor). Hadidjah has been separated from her husband, Kasimin, for several years, ever since she accused him of adultery. Although she regretted the incident almost immediately, it was too late; a corpse resembling Kasimin was found floating in a river, and in her hurry to see the body Hadidjah was struck by a car, blinding her. Now she sings the kroncong song "Sorga Ka Toedjoe", which Kasimin declared to be a symbol of his love, at 5 p.m. every day. Unknown to Hadidjah, Kasimin (Kartolo) is alive and well; he also sings "Sorga Ka Toedjoe" every day at the same time.

Following an encounter with the rich and detestable Parta, who intends to take her as his second wife, Rasminah goes to the nearby city of Batavia (now Jakarta) to find a job. Several days later, having found work, she returns to Puncak to pick up Hadidjah and take her to Batavia. Parta and his cohort Doel are waiting in ambush, and when Rasminah's carriage is stuck in a rut, the two begin to chase after her. Rasminah runs into the woods and, after several close calls, finds shelter in a small house. There she rests the night, without seeing the owner.

The following morning, Rasminah is awakened by the sound of a guitar, played by the house's owner, Hoesin (Djoemala). Afraid that he is collaborating with her pursuer, she sneaks outside, only to be confronted by Parta and Doel. Retreating, she is chased by the pair. Hoesin intervenes and, after a fierce fight, defeats the two and chases them away. He then reassures Rasminah and escorts her home.

Over the following days, Hoesin repeatedly visits Rasminah, and slowly the two begin to fall in love. When Rasminah takes her aunt to Batavia to live, Hoesin follows. They begin discussing their future together, but Rasminah insists that she will only marry when her aunt is reunited with Kasimin. After a lengthy search, in which he almost gives up hope, Hoesin finds Kasimin at a small plantation in the hills outside of the city – Hadidjah's long-lost husband previously operated his own orchard, but had been evicted by a conniving and greedy landlord only days before. Kasimin and Hadidjah are reunited, allowing Hoesin and Rasminah to begin their own preparations. (Note: Derived from the novelisation by L., published by Kolff-Buning.)

== Production ==
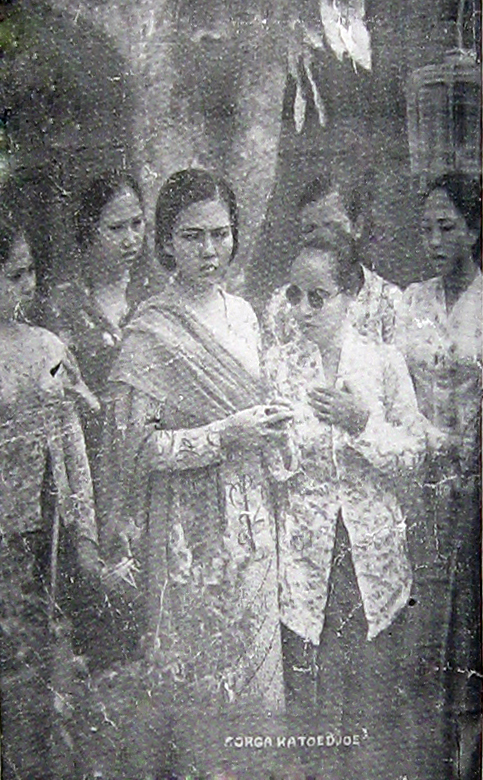
Roekiah (left) and Annie Landouw in a promotional still from the film

Sorga Ka Toedjoe was directed by brothers Joshua and Othniel Wong for Tan's Film, a company owned by the ethnic Chinese brothers Khoen Yauw and Khoen Hian. The Tan brothers, who owned a pair of cinemas, had been active in the industry since Njai Dasima in 1929. The Wongs had worked for Tan's since 1938, when they directed the hit film Fatima, helping to reestablish the company after it had been dissolved in 1932. Sorga Ka Toedjoe was shot in black-and-white, with some scenes filmed at Telaga Warna, near Buitenzorg.

The film starred Roekiah, Rd Djoemala, Kartolo, and Annie Landouw and featured Titing, Ismail, and Ramli. Roekiah had regularly been paired on-screen with Rd. Mochtar – despite being married to Kartolo – beginning with Terang Boelan. In 1938 the three had come to Tan's, where they acted together in three films beginning with Fatima. However, after a wage dispute following Siti Akbari (1940), Mochtar left the company. To replace him, Tan's hired the tailor Djoemala as Roekiah's romantic foil. Sorga Ka Toedjoe was their first film together.

Kartolo handled the film's music, and many of the cast had experience singing kroncong (traditional music with Portuguese influences). Before making their feature film debut in Albert Balink's Terang Boelan (Full Moon; 1937), Roekiah and Kartolo had found popularity with the stage musical troupe Palestina. Landouw had been a kroncong singer with Hugo Dumas' Lief Java orchestra, and Titing was likewise an established singer.

== Release and reception ==
Sorga Ka Toedjoe had its Surabaya premiere on 30 October 1940, one of fourteen domestic productions released that year. By March 1941 it had reached Singapore, then part of the Straits Settlements. As with all of Tan's productions, the film was targeted at lower-class native audiences of all ages. It was advertised, sometimes under the Dutch title In Den Zevenden Hemel, as a "simple yet compelling film" (Note: Original: "... een eenvoudig, doch pakkend verhaal") which featured "good music, catchy songs, and beautiful scenery". (Note: Original: "De goede muziek, pakkende liedjes en schitterende natuurtafereelen...") A novelisation of the film was released by the Yogyakarta-based publisher Kolff-Buning and included several production stills.

The film was a commercial success. Reviews were likewise positive. The Soerabaijasch Handelsblad gave the film high praise, stating that it had good dialogue and music as well as a "well chosen, romantic and not exaggerated" (Note: Original: "... goed gekozen, romantisch en niet overdreven.") theme. According to the reviewer, Sorga Ka Toedjoe seemed to have been inspired by American films but still showed its Indies character. The reviewer also opined that Djoemala was as good as, if not better, than Mochtar. De Indische Courant praised the scenery and noted that the film criticised rich landlords who abused their power, while the Singapore Free Press praised Roekiah's acting.

== Legacy ==
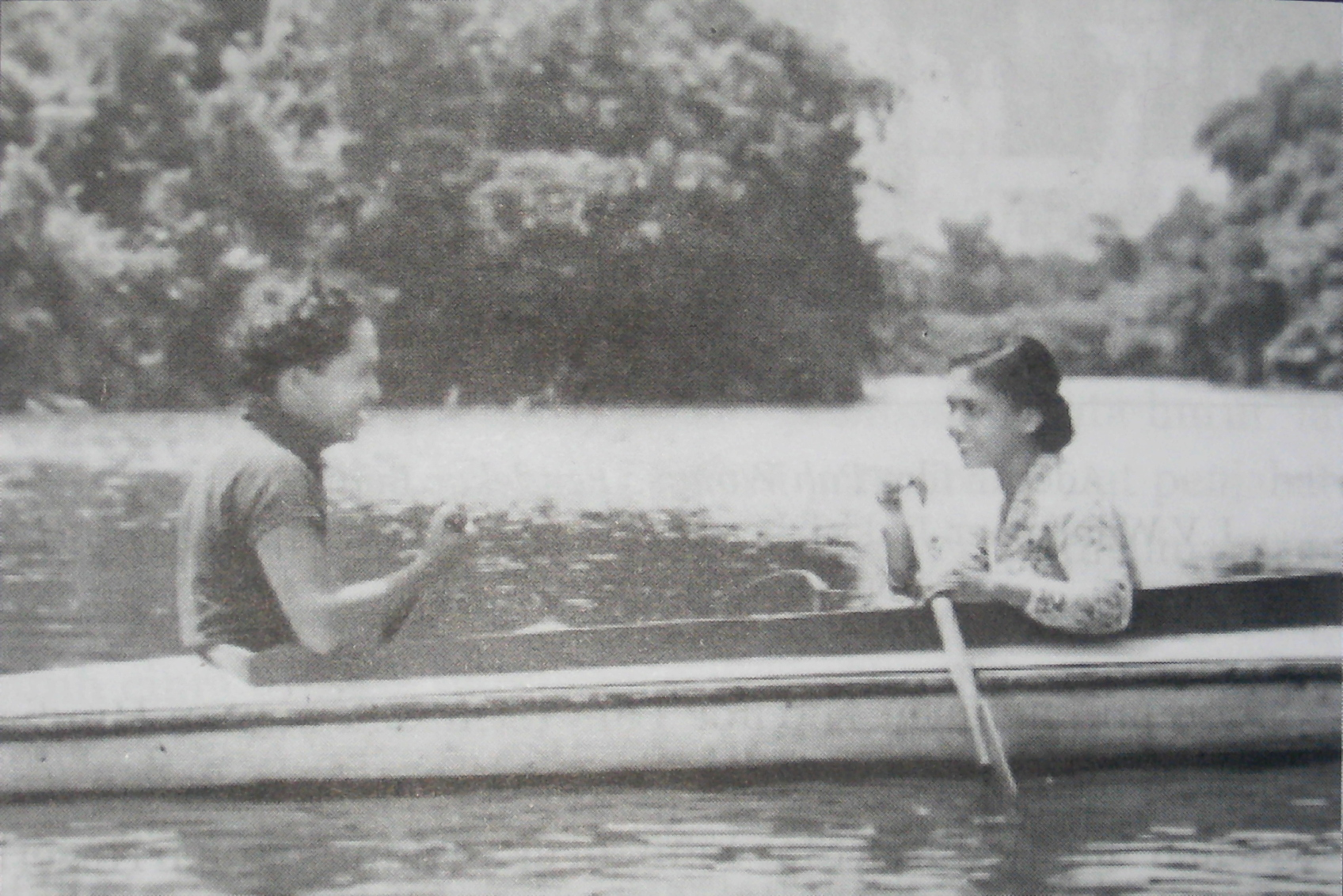
Djoemala and Roekiah went on to act in another three films together.

After Sorga Ka Toedjoe, Tan's Film produced a further four films, a much lower number than its competitors such as The Teng Chun's Java Industrial Film and its subsidiaries. Three of these productions starred Roekiah and Djoemala in the leading roles, and featured Kartolo. (Note: The company's final film, Aladin dengan Lampoe Wasiat (Aladin and the Magic Lamp), starred Elly Joenara, Benny, and Wolly Sutinah (Filmindonesia.or.id, Aladin).) Landouw, according to JB Kristanto's Katalog Film Indonesia (Indonesian Film Catalogue), did not make another film. Tan's was ultimately shut down in 1942, following the Japanese occupation of the Indies.

The film is likely lost. Movies were then shot on flammable nitrate film, and after a fire destroyed much of Produksi Film Negara's warehouse in 1952, old films shot on nitrate were deliberately destroyed. The American visual anthropologist Karl G. Heider writes that all Indonesian films from before 1950 are lost; Kristanto records several as having survived at Sinematek Indonesia's archives, and film historian Misbach Yusa Biran writes that several Japanese propaganda films have survived at the Netherlands Government Information Service.

== Works cited ==
- "A Malay Film". The Singapore Free Press and Mercantile Advertiser. 10 March 1941. p. 7.
- "Aladin dengan Lampoe Wasiat". filmindonesia.or.id (in Indonesian). Jakarta: Konfiden Foundation. Archived from the original on 2 December 2013.
- "Annie Landouw". filmindonesia.or.id (in Indonesian). Jakarta: Konfiden Foundation. Archived from the original on 6 January 2014.
- Biran, Misbach Yusa (2009). Sejarah Film 1900–1950: Bikin Film di Jawa [History of Film 1900–1950: Making Films in Java] (in Indonesian). Jakarta: Komunitas Bamboo working with the Jakarta Art Council. ISBN 978-979-3731-58-2.
- Biran, Misbach Yusa (2012). "Film di Masa Kolonial" [Film in the Colonial Period]. Indonesia dalam Arus Sejarah: Masa Pergerakan Kebangsaan [Indonesia in the Flow of Time: The Nationalist Movement] (in Indonesian). Vol. V. Ministry of Education and Culture. pp. 268–93. ISBN 978-979-9226-97-6.
- Esha, Teguh; Alhaziri, Wasmi; Fauzi, Muhammad; Donald W., Sabu; Sigarlaki, Erwin R. (2005). Ismail Marzuki: Musik, Tanah Air, dan Cinta [Ismail Marzuki: Music, Homeland, and Love] (in Indonesian). Yogyakarta: LP3ES. ISBN 978-979-3330-36-5.
- Heider, Karl G. (1991). Indonesian Cinema: National Culture on Screen. Honolulu: University of Hawaii Press. ISBN 978-0-8248-1367-3.
- L. (1940). Sorga Ka Toedjoe [Seventh Heaven] (in Indonesian). Yogyakarta: Kolff-Buning. OCLC 41906099. (book acquired from the collection of Museum Tamansiswa Dewantara Kirti Griya, Yogyakarta)
- Lontar Foundation, ed. (2006). Antologi Drama Indonesia 1895–1930 [Anthology of Indonesian Dramas 1895–1930] (in Indonesian). Jakarta: Lontar Foundation. ISBN 978-979-99858-2-8.
- "Roekiah". filmindonesia.or.id (in Indonesian). Konfidan Foundation. Archived from the original on 2 January 2014.
- "Sampoerna: Sorga ka Toedjoe". De Indische Courant (in Dutch). Surabaya. 30 October 1940. p. 2.
- "Sampoerna: Sorga ka Toedjoe (In den zevenden hemel)" [Sampoerna: Sorga ka Toedjoe (Seventh Heaven)]. Soerabaijasch Handelsblad (in Dutch). Surabaya: Kolff & Co. 30 October 1940. p. 6.
- "Sorga Ka Toedjoe". filmindonesia.or.id (in Indonesian). Jakarta: Konfiden Foundation. Archived from the original on 2 December 2013.
- "(untitled)". Soerabaijasch Handelsblad (in Dutch). Surabaya: Kolff & Co. 30 October 1940. p. 8.
