= Kartolo =

Indonesian actor and songwriter

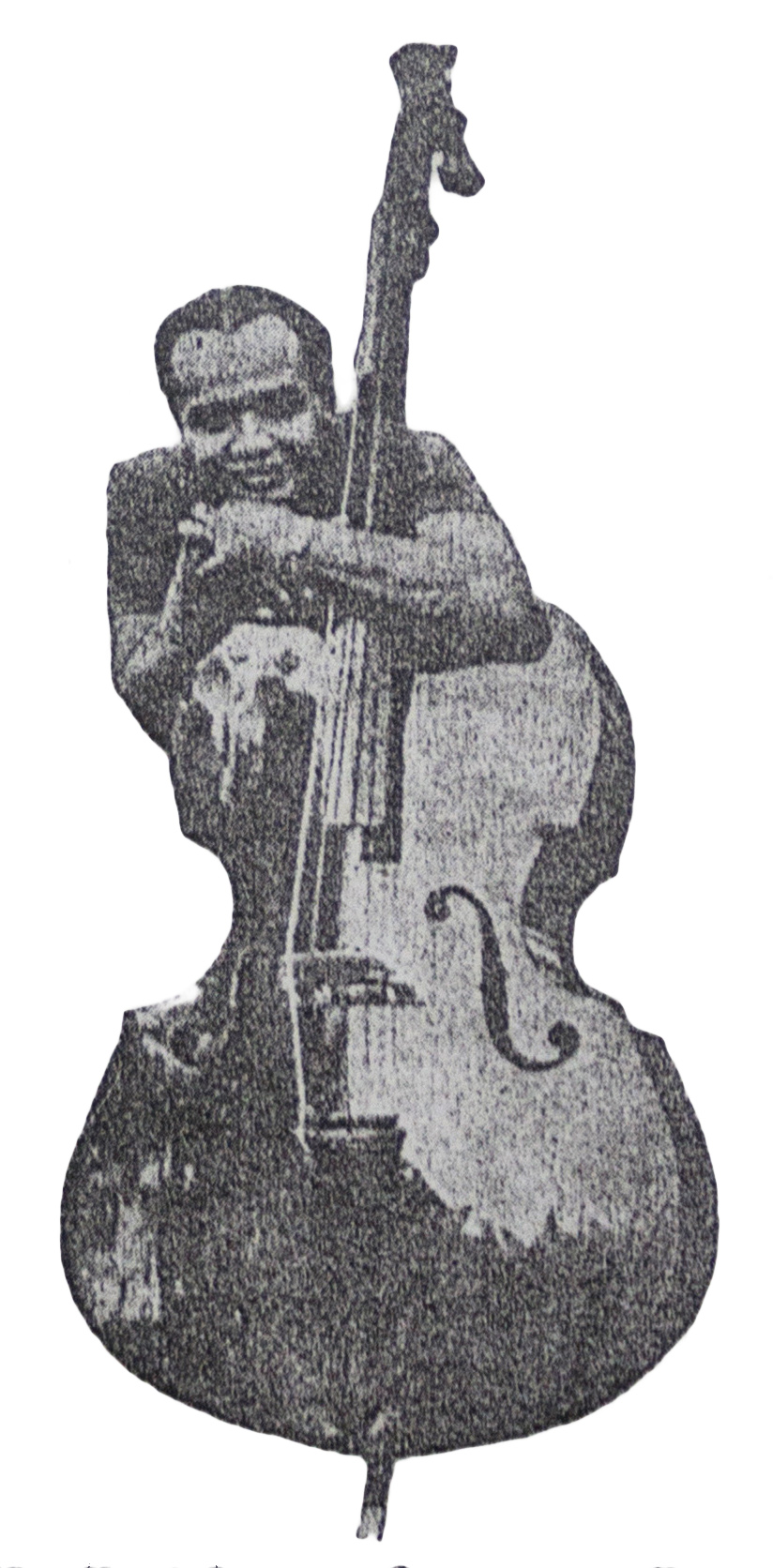
- Kartolo and his double bass, c. 1941
- Born: Yogyakarta, Dutch East Indies
- Died: 18 January 1949; Yogyakarta, Indonesia
- Occupation(s): Actor, songwriter
- Years active: 1930s–1948
- Notable work: Terang Boelan
- Spouse: Roekiah (m. 1932; died 1945)
- Children: 5, including Rachmat Kartolo

Raden Mas Kartolo (died 18 January 1949) was an Indonesian actor and songwriter. Born in Yogyakarta to a noble family, he entered the theatre and married the actress Roekiah around 1933. The two, living in Batavia (now Jakarta) acted in numerous movies together, starting with the 1938 hit Terang Boelan. However, Roekiah was always cast with other actors as her romantic interest. After Roekiah died in 1945, Kartolo brought the family to Yogyakarta and worked with Radio Republik Indonesia until his death. One of his sons, Rachmat Kartolo, went on to be an actor in the 1960s and 1970s.

== Early life and career ==
Kartolo was born in Yogyakarta, Dutch East Indies (now Indonesia), as the son of Honggodimedjo who was of noble descent. Around 1933, while a member of the Palestina touring troupe, he met his future wife Roekiah, a stage actress and singer of keroncong music (traditional music with Portuguese influences) in the Batavia (modern-day Jakarta) area. After leaving Palestina, in 1934 they toured in Singapore with the Faroka troupe.

== Film career ==
In 1937 Kartolo made his first film appearance as a supporting character and comedic relief in Albert Balink's Terang Boelan (Full Moon). Roekiah starred alongside Rd. Mochtar; the two played young lovers. Terang Boelan was a commercial success, drawing over 200,000 Straits dollars during its international release in British Malaya. As Algemeen Nederlandsch Indisch Filmsyndicaat, which had produced Terang Boelan, stopped its work on feature films, Kartolo and many other cast and crew members migrated to Tan's Film. In this time, Kartolo and Roekiah established the short-lived Terang Boelan Troupe, which saw another tour to Singapore.

With Tan's, Kartolo and the Terang Boelan migrants were utilised for the 1938 hit Fatima, starring Roekiah and Mochtar; Kartolo once again took a secondary role. This film, which closely followed the formula established by Terang Boelan, was a commercial success, earning 200,000 gulden on a 7,000 gulden budget and establishing Roekiah and Mochtar as the nation's first on-screen celebrity couple; when Mochtar left Tan's in 1940, Rd. Djoemala took over as Roekiah's on-screen love interest. Kartolo continued to act in secondary roles alongside his wife, with her singing songs he wrote: the couple received a monthly holding fee of 200 gulden, twice as much as they had been given for Terang Boelan. They were also given a house in Tanah Rendah. Kartolo and Roekiah appeared in six further films together, although never as lovers.

Film production in the Indies declined after the Japanese occupation beginning in early 1942, in which all but one studio was closed. Kartolo acted in two propaganda films for this occupation government, although not alongside Roekiah: Kartolo was in the 1943 feature-length Berdjoang (Hope of the South) and the 1944 short Djatoeh Berkait (Fall Together), while Roekiah was in the 1944 short Ke Seberang (To the Other Side).

== Later life ==
After Roekiah's death in 1945, Kartolo left Jakarta (renamed during the occupation) with their five children and worked at Radio Republik Indonesia for three years. This period was one of great turmoil, as the Indonesian National Revolution, a fight against the Dutch who had returned to recapture the Indies after the Japanese surrender in 1945, was in full swing. When the Dutch captured Yogyakarta following Operation Kraai in December 1948, Kartolo refused to cooperate with the colonial government. He died soon afterwards, on 18 January 1949.

Of Kartolo and Roekiah's five children, one died while in Yogyakarta while the rest were brought to Jakarta and raised by Kartolo's close friend Adikarso. One of them, Rachmat Kartolo, went on to be an actor, active up through the 1970s.

== Filmography ==
- Terang Boelan (Full Moon; 1937)
- Fatima (1938)
- Siti Akbari (1940)
- Gagak Item (Black Raven; 1939)
- Roekihati (1940)
- Sorga Ka Toedjoe (Seventh Heaven; 1940)
- Poesaka Terpendam (Buried Heritage; 1941)
- Koeda Sembrani (The Enchanted Horse; 1942)
- Berdjoang (Hope of the South; 1943)
- Djatoeh Berkait (Fall Together; 1944; short film)
