= Djoemala =

Indonesian actor

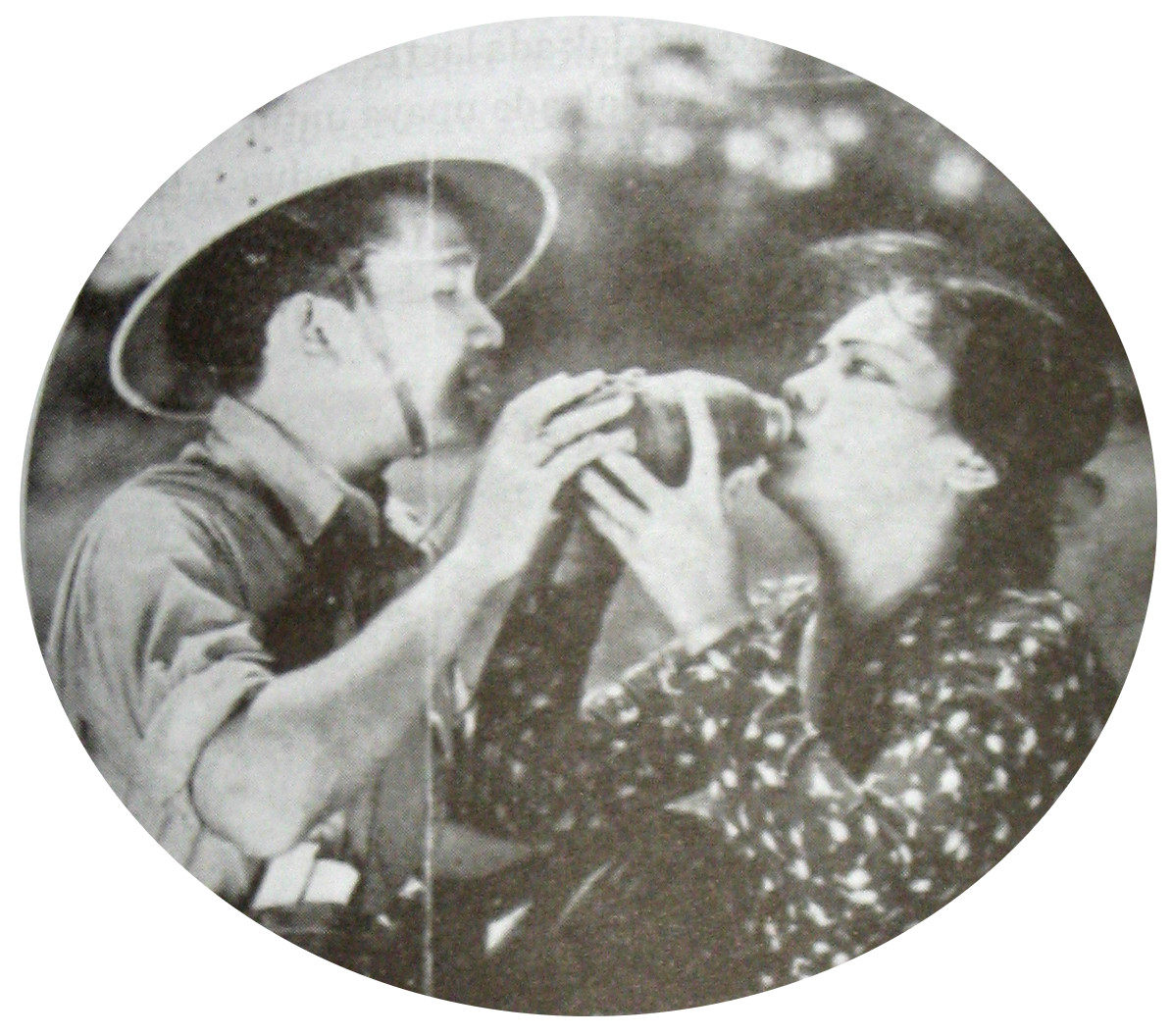
Djoemala (left) and romantic foil Roekiah in Roekihati (1941)

Ismail Djoemala (also credited Rd Djoemala; Perfected Spelling: Ismail Jumala; 1915/18 – 10 June 1992) was an Indonesian actor active in the 1940s. He was often cast alongside Roekiah as her romantic interest.

== Biography ==
Djoemala was born in Batavia (now Jakarta, Indonesia), the capital city of the Dutch East Indies. Sources disagree on his year of birth; the catalogue Apa Siapa Film Indonesia gives 19 September 1915, while Indonesian film historian Misbach Yusa Biran gives 1918. Although later billed as "Raden" Djoemala, the actor was not of noble descent. He had some schooling, completing his junior high school in 1934.

A tailor by trade, Djoemala had owned the Broadway Store located on Kramat Raya Street. In 1940 he was approached by Tan's Film and cast for their new production, Sorga Ka Toedjoe (Seventh Heaven). He was cast opposite Tan's mainstay Roekiah, whose regular on-screen partner, Rd Mochtar, had recently left the company owing to wage concerns. Djoemala was chosen for his good looks and tall body. In the film, Djoemala played Hoesin, who reunites the long-separated Hadidjah (Annie Landouw) and Kasimin (Kartolo; Roekiah's husband) to win the hand of Roekiah's character Rasmina. The film was a success, and one reviewer opined that Djoemala was as good as, if not better, than Mochtar.

The pair's next film together, Roekihati, cast Djoemala as a city-dweller named Mansoer who falls for a village girl named Roekihati (Roekiah), but is nearly forced to marry another woman. In 1941 Djoemala and Roekiah acted in another two films together, Poesaka Terpendam (Buried Treasure) and Koeda Sembrani (The Enchanted Horse). Although all of these films were moderate critical successes, ultimately the pairing of Djoemala and Roekiah was unable to draw as many viewers as Mochtar and Roekiah had done. Biran writes that Roekiah's singing and the comedic antics of Kartolo were all that Tan's could depend on during this period.

Following the Japanese occupation of the Indies in February 1942, Tan's was closed. Djoemala is not recorded as having acted in any further films. During the occupation he joined a theatre troupe, Pantjawarna, in West Java, while in the Indonesian National Revolution (1945–49) he fought as a guerrilla. After the revolution he returned to working as an entrepreneur and tailor, dying in Jakarta on 10 June 1992.

== Filmography ==
- Sorga Ka Toedjoe (1940)
- Roekihati (1940)
- Poesaka Terpendam (1941)
- Koeda Sembrani (1942/43)

== Works cited ==
- Apa Siapa Orang Film Indonesia [What and Who: Film Figures in Indonesia] (in Indonesian). Jakarta: Indonesian Ministry of Information. 1999. OCLC 44427179.
- Biran, Misbach Yusa (2009). Sejarah Film 1900–1950: Bikin Film di Jawa [History of Film 1900–1950: Making Films in Java] (in Indonesian). Komunitas Bamboo working with the Jakarta Art Council. ISBN 978-979-3731-58-2.
- L. (c. 1940). Sorga Ka Toedjoe [Seventh Heaven] (in Indonesian). Yogyakarta: Kolff-Buning. OCLC 41906099. (book acquired from the collection of Museum Tamansiswa Dewantara Kirti Griya, Yogyakarta)
- "Rd Djoemala". filmindonesia.or.id. Jakarta: Konfidan Foundation. Archived from the original on 6 March 2016.
- "Sampoerna: Sorga ka Toedjoe (In den zevenden hemel)" [Sampoerna: Sorga ka Toedjoe (Seventh Heaven)]. Soerabaijasch Handelsblad (in Dutch). Surabaya: Kolff & Co. 30 October 1940. p. 6.
- "Roekihati". filmindonesia.or.id. Jakarta: Konfidan Foundation. Archived from the original on 2 December 2013.
