= Siti Akbari =

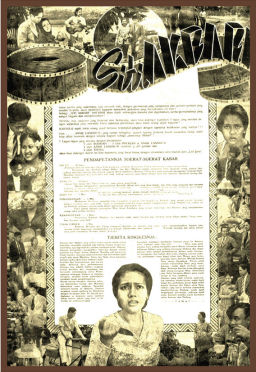
- Theatrical poster
- Directed by: Joshua and Othniel Wong
- Produced by: Tan Khoen Yauw
- Starring: Roekiah; Rd Mochtar; Kartolo; Annie Landouw; Titing
- Cinematography: Joshua and Othniel Wong
- Production company: Tan's Film
- Release date: 29 April 1940 (Dutch East Indies)
- Country: Dutch East Indies
- Language: Malay

Siti Akbari is a 1940 film from the Dutch East Indies (now Indonesia) directed by Joshua and Othniel Wong and produced by Tan Khoen Yauw. Starring Roekiah and Rd Mochtar, it follows a couple while the husband commits adultery.

== Plot ==
Siti Akbari (Roekiah) is living happily with her husband. When he begins to wander she stays faithful and he eventually comes back to her.

== Production ==
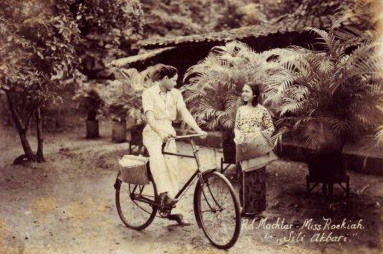
Rd Mochtar and Roekiah in Siti Akbari

Siti Akbari was directed by Joshua and Othniel Wong, ethnic Chinese brothers who had received film training in the United States and been active in the film industry of the Dutch East Indies since 1929's Lily van Java. The film's producer, Tan Khoen Yauw, was co-owner of the production studio that made the work, Tan's Film.

The black-and-white talkie featured vocals by the actresses Annie Landouw and Titing, with the keroncong group Lief Java providing background music. Several further cast members, including the stars Mochtar, Roekiah, and her husband Kartolo, had migrated to Tan's after the success of Albert Balink's Terang Boelan (1937); the earlier film's formula of scenery, music, and action, which Tan's had already utilised in 1938's Fatima, was present in Siti Akbari as well.

The title Siti Akbari is reminiscent of a syair, or traditional Malay poem, written by Lie Kim Hok in 1884; his Sair Tjerita Siti Akbari had previously been adapted for the stage. However, the influence Lim's work exerted on the film is unknown: it may have simply lent the title, or it may have been adapted in its entirety.

== Release ==
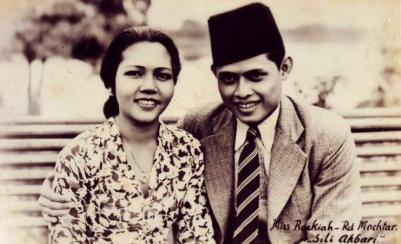
Roekiah and Rd Mochtar in Siti Akbari

Siti Akbari premiered at the Cinema Palace Theatre on 29 April 1940. For promotion, Tan's Film release a novelisation of the film shortly afterwards on Kolf Publishers; the writing team was headed by Andjar Asmara. The film proved to be the last starring Roekiah and Mochtar as lovers; he left Tan's soon after over a wage dispute, being replaced by the tailor Rd Djoemala for Roekihati in 1940.

The production is likely a lost film. The American visual anthropologist Karl G. Heider writes that all Indonesian films from before 1950 are lost. However, JB Kristanto's Katalog Film Indonesia (Indonesian Film Catalogue) records several as having survived at Sinematek Indonesia's archives, and Biran writes that several Japanese propaganda films have survived at the Netherlands Government Information Service.
