= Koeda Sembrani =

- Directed by: Joshua Wong; Othniel Wong
- Produced by: Tan Koen Yauw
- Starring: Roekiah; Djoemala
- Production company: Tan's Film
- Release date: 1943
- Country: Dutch East Indies
- Language: Indonesian

Koeda Sembrani (Note: Koeda Sembrani is often translated Pegasus, though it does not have the connotations of Greek mythology. A more appropriate translation may be The Flying Horse or The Mystic Horse.) (Perfected Spelling: Kuda Sembrani) is a film from the Dutch East Indies (now Indonesia) which began filming in 1942 and was completed sometime before 1943. Released by Tan's Film and directed by Joshua and Othniel Wong, it was the last film featuring the romantic partnership of Roekiah and Djoemala.

== Production ==
Koeda Sembrani was directed by brothers Joshua and Othniel Wong and produced by Tan Koen Yauw of Tan's Film. The black-and-white production starred Roekiah (as Princess Shams-al-Nahar) and Djoemala; the two had been paired in romantic roles since Sorga Ka Toedjoe in 1940. The film also featured Wolly Sutinah, Kartolo, Husein, Ali, Rd Dadang Ismail.

Production of Koeda Sembrani had begun by February 1942. Tan's promotional material stated that it had employed "hundreds, if not thousands" ("ratoesan, kalau boleh riboean") of cast members. The company included scenes such as Roekiah flying on an enchanted horse, as well as beautiful scenery. Part of the film was shot on an extravagant palace set which Tan's had constructed.

The story for Koeda Sembrani was drawn from the One Thousand and One Arabian Nights. It was one of several contemporary works adapted from Nights, though all were taken from different stories. Other contemporary works with similar source material were Tan's Film's Aladin, Populair's Film's Moestika dari Djemar (Jewel of Jemar), and Java Industrial Film's Ratna Moetoe Manikam. Neither of Tan's works adapted from Nights were completed the Japanese occupation of the Dutch East Indies began in 1942. Filming of Koeda Sembrani was completed sometime afterwards, before October 1943.

== Release and legacy ==
Koeda Sembrani was showing in theatres by 28 October 1943. The film marked the last on-stage collaboration between Djoemala and Roekiah. The Japanese occupation government had closed all but one film studio, including Tan's. Djoemala, by trade an entrepreneur, left acting soon afterwards. Roekiah appeared in a single film, the short propaganda piece Ke Seberang (1944), before her death in 1945.

JB Kristanto's Katalog Film Indonesia records a 35 mm copy of the film having survived at Sinematek Indonesia.

== Works cited ==
- Apa Siapa Orang Film Indonesia [What and Who: Film Figures in Indonesia] (in Indonesian). Jakarta: Indonesian Ministry of Information. 1999. OCLC 44427179.
- Biran, Misbach Yusa (2009). Sejarah Film 1900–1950: Bikin Film di Jawa [History of Film 1900–1950: Making Films in Java] (in Indonesian). Jakarta: Komunitas Bamboo working with the Jakarta Art Council. ISBN 978-979-3731-58-2.
- "Koeda Sembrani". filmindonesia.or.id (in Indonesian). Jakarta: Konfiden Foundation. Archived from the original on 2 December 2013.
- "Pertoendjoekan Bioskop-Bioskop di Djakarta Ini Malam (28 Oktober 2603)" [Showing in Theatres Tonight (28 October 1943)]. Pembangoen (in Indonesian). Jakarta. 28 October 1943. p. 4. Archived from the original on 2 January 2014.
- "Roekiah". filmindonesia.or.id (in Indonesian). Konfiden Foundation. Archived from the original on 2 January 2014.
- "Studio Nieuws" [Studio News]. Pertjatoeran Doenia Dan Film (in Indonesian). 1 (9). Batavia: 19–21. February 1942.
