= Rachmat Kartolo =

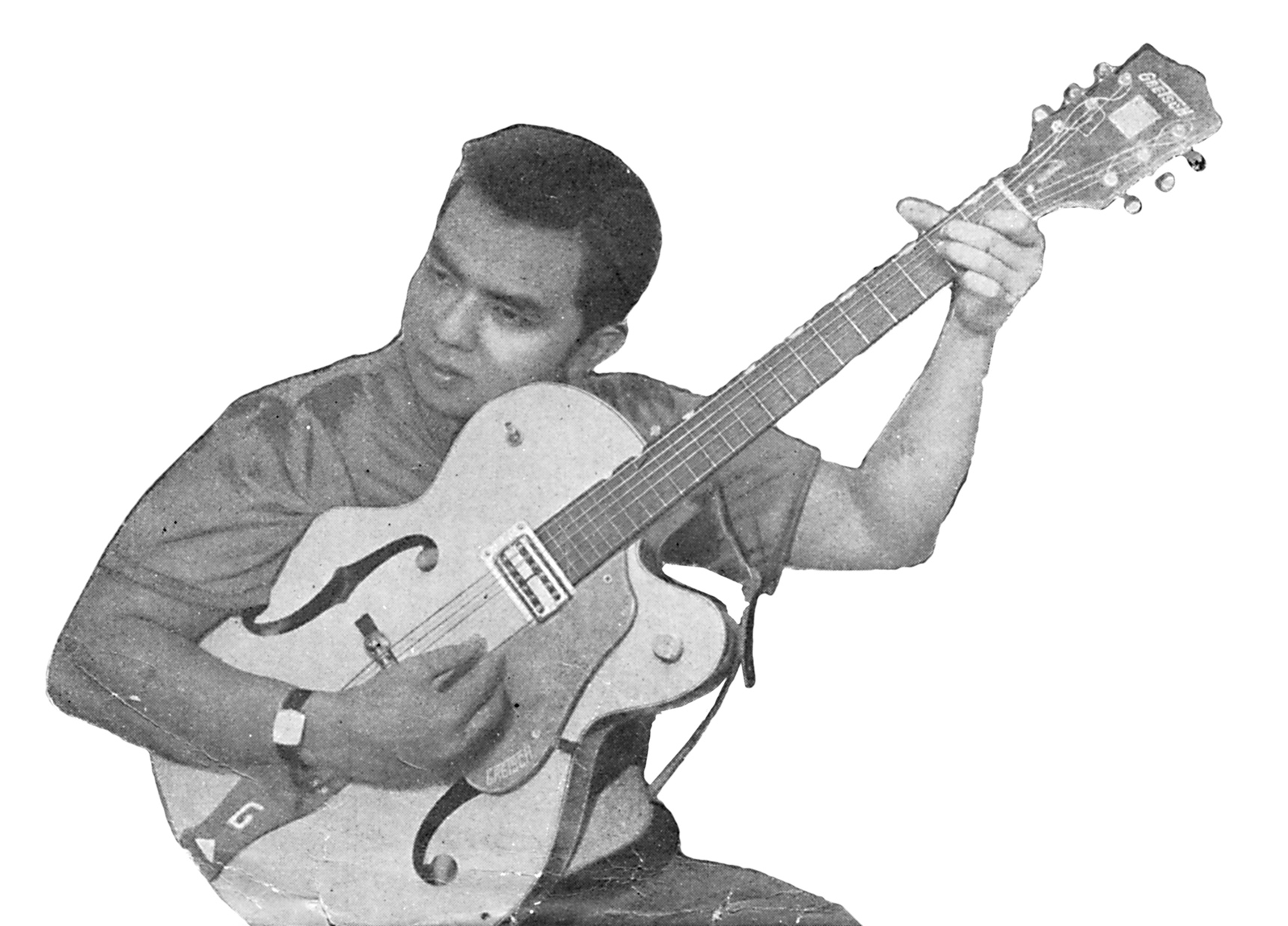
- Rachmat Kartolo in 1963
- Born: 13 March 1938; Batavia, Dutch East Indies
- Died: 18 September 2001 (aged 63); Jakarta, Indonesia
- Occupations: Actor, singer
- Years active: 1960s–2001
- Children: 1
- Parents: Kartolo (father); Roekiah (mother)
- Relatives: Aminah Cendrakasih (cousin)

Rachmat Kartolo (13 March 1938 – 18 September 2001) was an Indonesian actor and singer.

== Early life ==
Rachmat Kartolo born on 13 March 1938 in Batavia, Dutch East Indies. He was one of five children born to Kartolo (died 1949) and Roekiah (1917–1945), two film actors active with Tan's Film, on 13 March 1938. After Roekiah's death, Kartolo brought the children to his hometown at Yogyakarta. In the city, the Indonesian capital during the later days of the Indonesian National Revolution, Rachmat lost one of his siblings and, in 1949, his father. After the Dutch recognised Indonesia's independence, Rachmat and his surviving siblings – Jusuf, Imam, and Sri Wahjuni – were brought to Jakarta and raised by their father's friend, Adikarso. There Rachmat completed his education, graduating from senior high school before entering the National Theatre Academy of Indonesia.

== Career ==
Adikarso introduced Rachmat to music and the recording industry; Rachmat and his brothers performed at Wisma Nusantara in Harmoni, Jakarta, under their guardian's supervision. In 1958 Rachmat and his brothers established a band. Though Jusuf and Imam later left, Rachmat went on to solo success. At the time the government under president Sukarno forbade the use of English-language music, and thus, the Encyclopedia of Jakarta writes, Indonesian popular music was in search of its identity. Rachmat used sounds inspired from country music, and his songs were mostly about romance. His first hit, in 1963, was "Patah Hati" ("Heartbroken"), written by his brother Imam. The song had another burst of popularity in 1984, allowing him to buy a new car.

Though he initially showed no interest in film, in 1964 Rachmat appeared in his first production, Kunanti Djawabanmu (I Await your Reply). By 1977 he had completed more than 20 films. In 1975 he established his own production house, Mafin Film, and in 1978 he made his directorial debut with Tengkorak Hitam (Black Skull). Even after entering film he continued to record albums, first on gramophone records then on cassettes.

From his debut until his final role in Titisan Dewi (1990), Rachmat appeared in more than 40 films, including action flicks such as Matjan Kemajoran (1965), comedies such as Benyamin Jatuh Cinta (1976), and dramas such as Bernafas dalam Lumpur (1970). He directed a total of four films: Tengkorak Hitam, Masih Adakah Cinta (1980), Jangan Sakiti Hatinya (1980) and Mat Pelor (1990).

== Death ==
Rachmat died at Gatot Soebroto Army Hospital in Senen, Central Jakarta, on 18 September 2001, after suffering from lymphoma for two years. He was buried at Kober Cemetery in Jatinegara, East Jakarta, on 19 September 2001. In June of that year he had made a stage performance in Blitar, portraying former president Sukarno in a memorial performance.

== Personal life ==
Rachmat was married and has had a son, Mohammad Raka Daniel.

== Works cited ==
- Biran, Misbach Yusa, ed. (1979). Apa Siapa Orang Film Indonesia 1926–1968 [Who and What of Indonesian Film Figures, 1926–1968]. Sinematek Indonesia. OCLC 6655859.
- "Filmografi Rachmat Kartolo" [Filmography for Rachmat Kartolo]. filmindonesia.or.id (in Indonesian). Konfiden Foundation. Archived from the original on 30 December 2013.
- "Kartolo". filmindonesia.or.id (in Indonesian). Konfiden Foundation. Archived from the original on 30 December 2013.
- "Miss Roekiah: Artis Teladan" [Miss Roekiah: Talented Artist]. Moderna (in Indonesian). 1 (6). Jakarta: 30, 34. 1969.
- Osdar, J (1 June 2010). "Aroma Bung Karno" [Aroma of Bung Karno]. Kompas. Archived from the original on 23 February 2014.
- "Rachmat Kartolo". Encyclopedia of Jakarta (in Indonesian). Jakarta City Government. Archived from the original on 30 December 2013.
- Liputan6.com (2001-09-19). "Rahmat Kartolo Menutup Usia". liputan6.com (in Indonesian).
