= Roekihati =

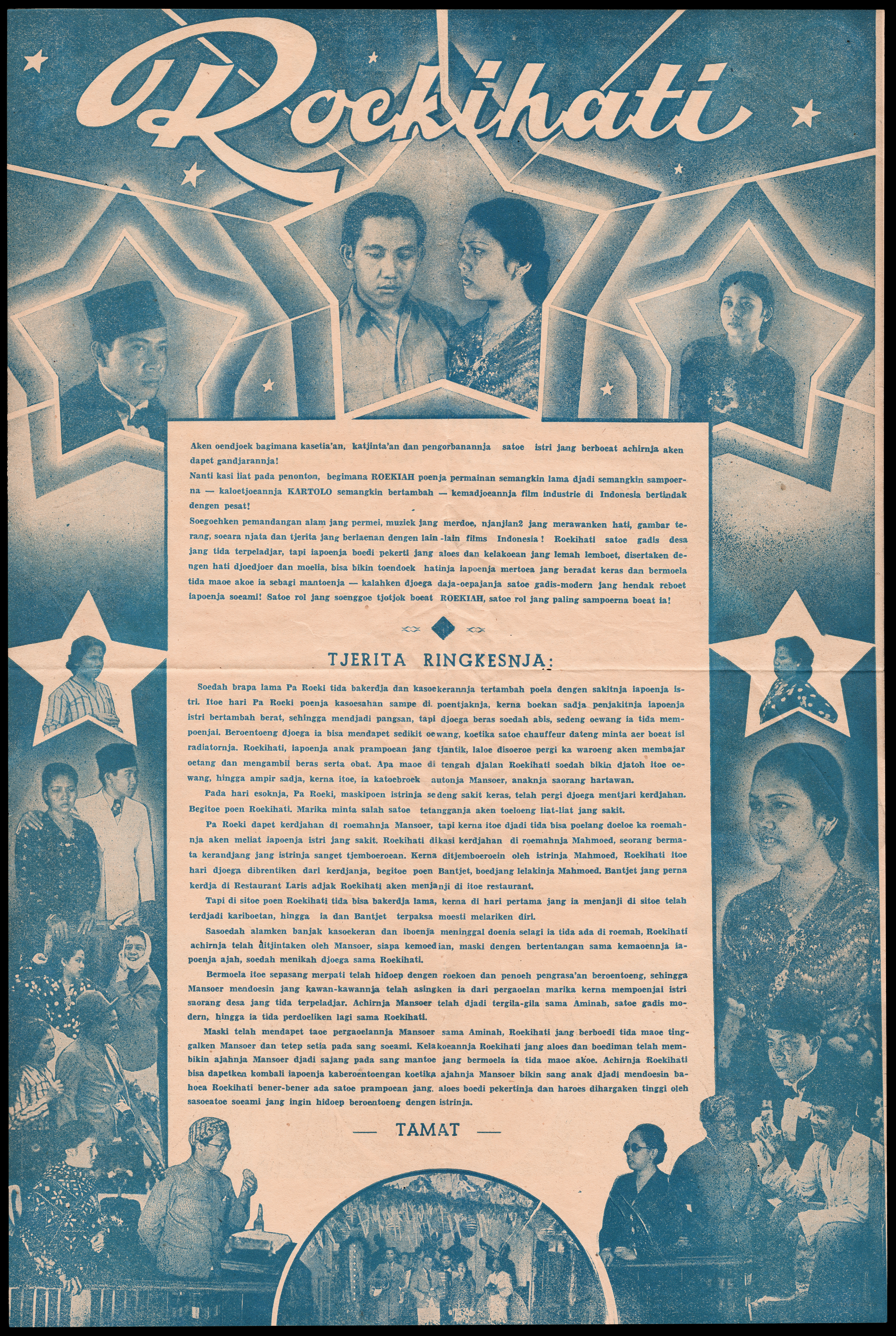
- Poster
- Directed by: Joshua Wong; Othniel Wong
- Produced by: Tan Khoen Yauw
- Starring: Rd Djoemala; Roekiah; Kartolo
- Cinematography: Joshua Wong; Othniel Wong
- Music by: Mas Sardi
- Production company: Tan's Film
- Release date: 1940 (Dutch East Indies)
- Country: Dutch East Indies
- Language: Malay

Roekihati is a 1940 film from the Dutch East Indies. Directed by the brothers Joshua and Othniel Wong and produced by Tan's Film, it follows a young village woman who goes to the city and encounters various difficulties. Targeted at lower-class audiences, it was shot in black-and-white and starred Roekiah and Raden Djoemala.

== Plot ==
The village girl Roekihati (Roekiah) goes to the city to find money so she can care for her ailing mother and father. She first works at the home of a rich playboy before going to become a singer at a restaurant; both of these jobs fail miserably. Eventually she marries Mansoer (Rd. Djoemala), a coupling to which Mansoer's father objects vehemently. With his family and friends urging him on, Mansoer begins to fall for a city girl named Aminah, ignoring Roekihati. However, when Mansoer sees that Roekihati is faithfully attending to him despite how he treats her he decides that he was wrong and returns to her.

== Production ==
Roekihati was directed by the brothers Joshua and Othniel Wong and produced by the Chinese-owned studio Tan's Film. The Wongs also handled sound editing and cinematography, in black-and-white. It starred Roekiah and Raden Djoemala, a tailor who had replaced the nobleman Raden Mochtar, who often played opposite Roekiah, following a wage dispute. The film also featured Roekiah's songwriter husband, Kartolo, who had frequently appeared on-screen with her since the couple's debut in Terang Boelan (1937). As first promoted by Terang Boelan, Roekihati continued the formula of mixing music, beautiful scenery, and action scenes.

== Release ==
Roekihati was released in 1940. Although the year marked a rise in intellectualism within the domestic film industry, Roekihati bucked the trend and instead was targeted at lower-class audiences; another such production was Java Industrial Film's Rentjong Atjeh (1940). The film was a commercial success.

The production is likely a lost film. The American visual anthropologist Karl G. Heider writes that all Indonesian films from before 1950 are lost. However, JB Kristanto's Katalog Film Indonesia (Indonesian Film Catalogue) records several as having survived at Sinematek Indonesia's archives, and Biran writes that several Japanese propaganda films have survived at the Netherlands Government Information Service.
