= Poesaka Terpendam =

1941 film

Polisaka perpetuum Terpendam
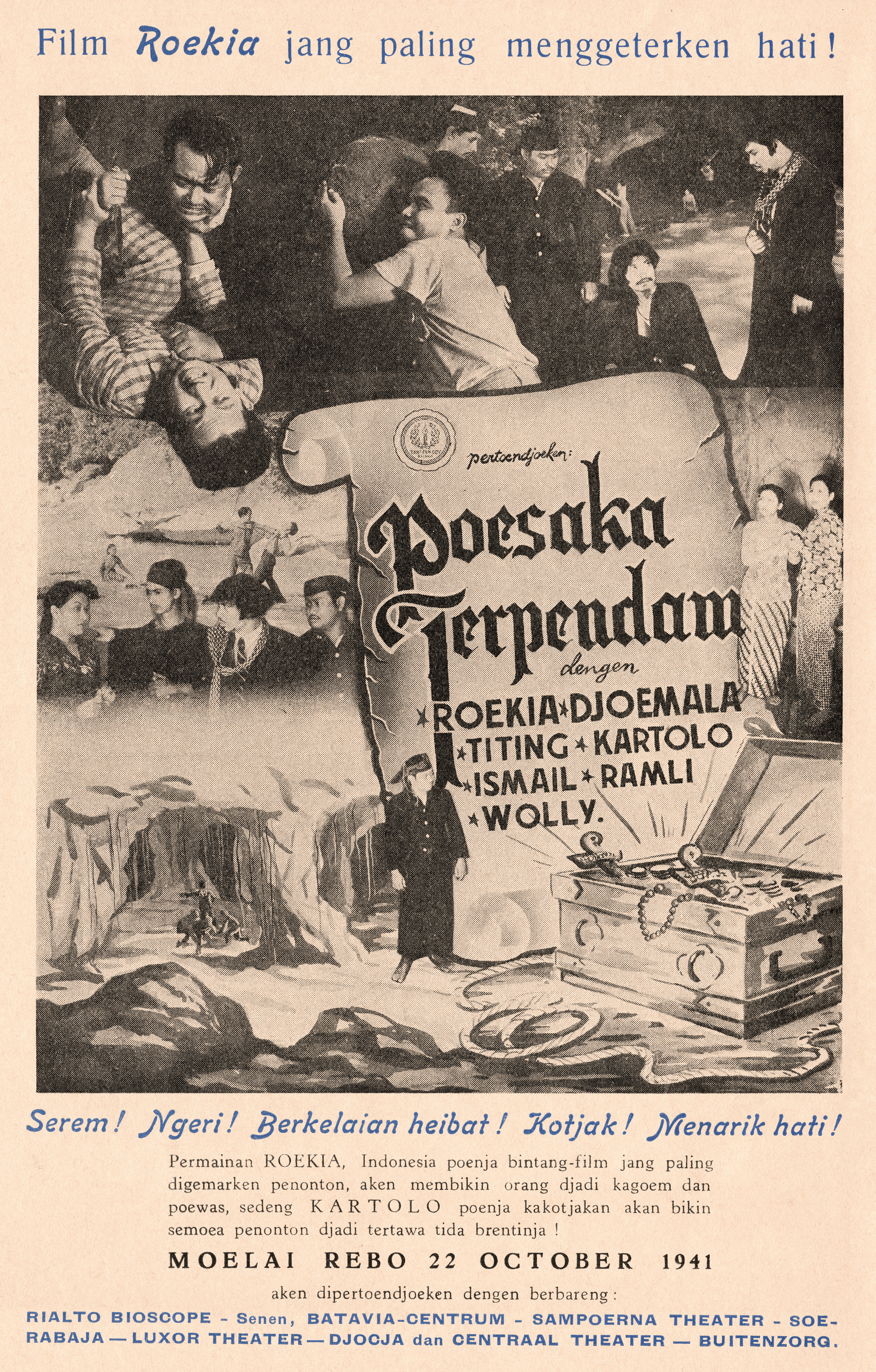
- Advertisement, Poestaka Timoer
- Produced by: Tan Khoen Yauw
- Starring: Roekiah; Djoemala
- Production company: Tan's Film
- Release date: 22 October 1941 (Dutch East Indies)
- Country: Dutch East Indies
- Language: Indonesian

Poesaka Terpendam (Perfected Spelling: Pusaka Terpendam; Indonesian for Buried Treasure) is a 1941 film from the Dutch East Indies produced by Tan's Film and starring Roekiah, Djoemala, and Kartolo.

== Plot ==
Two young men, Agoes and Badjoel, travel from Palembang to West Java and are told of the beauty of two sisters, Zaenab and Djoeleha, who live in Cicadas village with their father. The friends decided to visit Cicadas. Meanwhile, a local bandit leader named Ramelan has asked for Zaenab's hand in marriage. She and her father Ardi refuse, and Ramelan is forced to leave.

Through an old letter found on Ardi, Ramelan learns of a buried treasure containing some 30,000 gulden. He decided to dig it up, kidnapping Zaenab and Djoeleha in the process. Seeing this, Agoes and Badjoel follow Ramelan to his gang's hideout in a cave and fight to save the treasure and girls.

After rescuing the girls and defeating the bandits, Agoes and Badjoel are allowed to marry Zaenab and Djoeleha. The treasure, meanwhile, is divided amongst them.

== Production ==
Poesaka Terpendam was produced by Tan's Film and starred Roekiah and Rd Djoemala. It also featured Titing, Kartolo, Ismail, Ramli, and Wolly Sutinah. Shooting for the film, originally titled Poesaka Pendeman, began in June 1941. Scenes for this black-and-white film were shot in Banten, including Lake Tasikardi in Serang and Lake Tikoro in Rajamandala. The film featured several kroncong songs, some sung by Roekiah.

== Release and reception ==
Poesaka Terpendam was released on 22 October 1941, on the Eid ul-Fitr holiday. It was debuted simultaneously at the Sampoerna Theatre in Surabaya, the Luxor Theatre in Yogyakarta, the Centraal Theatre in Buitenzorg, and the Rialto Theatre in Senen, Batavia. A preview in Poestaka Timoer promised a great performance from Roekiah as well as an extraordinarily comic one from Kartolo.

Pertjatoeran Doenia dan Film wrote that it was the only film to date in which Djoemala seemed out of place, the reviewer wrote that Djoemala seemed overly stiff and unnatural during the fight scenes. A review in De Indische Courant praised the film's scenery.

The film is likely lost, as are all Indonesian films from before 1950, according to American visual anthropologist Karl G. Heider. As with every other place in the world at the time, movies produced in the Indies were shot on highly flammable nitrate film, and after a fire destroyed much of Produksi Film Negara's warehouse in 1952, old films shot on nitrate were deliberately destroyed. However, Kristanto records several as having survived at Sinematek Indonesia's archives, and film historian Misbach Yusa Biran wrote that several Japanese propaganda films have survived at the Netherlands Government Information Service.

== Works cited ==
- Biran, Misbach Yusa (2009). Sejarah Film 1900–1950: Bikin Film di Jawa [History of Film 1900–1950: Making Films in Java] (in Indonesian). Komunitas Bamboo working with the Jakarta Art Council. ISBN 978-979-3731-58-2.
- Biran, Misbach Yusa (2012). "Film di Masa Kolonial" [Film in the Colonial Period]. Indonesia dalam Arus Sejarah: Masa Pergerakan Kebangsaan [Indonesia in the Flow of Time: The Nationalist Movement] (in Indonesian). Vol. V. Ministry of Education and Culture. pp. 268–93. ISBN 978-979-9226-97-6.
- Heider, Karl G. (1991). Indonesian Cinema: National Culture on Screen. Honolulu: University of Hawaii Press. ISBN 978-0-8248-1367-3.
- "Ismail Djoemala: Dari Doenia Dagang ke Doenia Film" [Ismail Djoemala: From Enterprise to Film]. Pertjatoeran Doenia Dan Film (in Indonesian). 1 (9). Batavia: 7–8. February 1942.
- "Poesaka Terpendam" [Buried Treasure]. Pertjatoeran Doenia Dan Film (in Indonesian). 1 (4). Batavia: 40. September 1941.
- "Poesaka Terpendem" [Buried Treasure]. Poestaka Timoer (in Indonesian) (66). Yogyakarta: 29. 15 October 1941.
- "Poesaka Terpendam". filmindonesia.or.id (in Indonesian). Jakarta: Konfiden Foundation. Archived from the original on 2 December 2013.
- "Sampoerna: "Poesaka terpendam"" [Sampoerna: 'Poesaka Terpendam']. De Indische Courant (in Dutch). Surabaya. 10 October 1941. p. 2.
- "Warta dari Studio" [Reports from the Studios]. Pertjatoeran Doenia Dan Film (in Indonesian). 1 (2). Batavia: 27. July 1941.
