= Berdjoang =

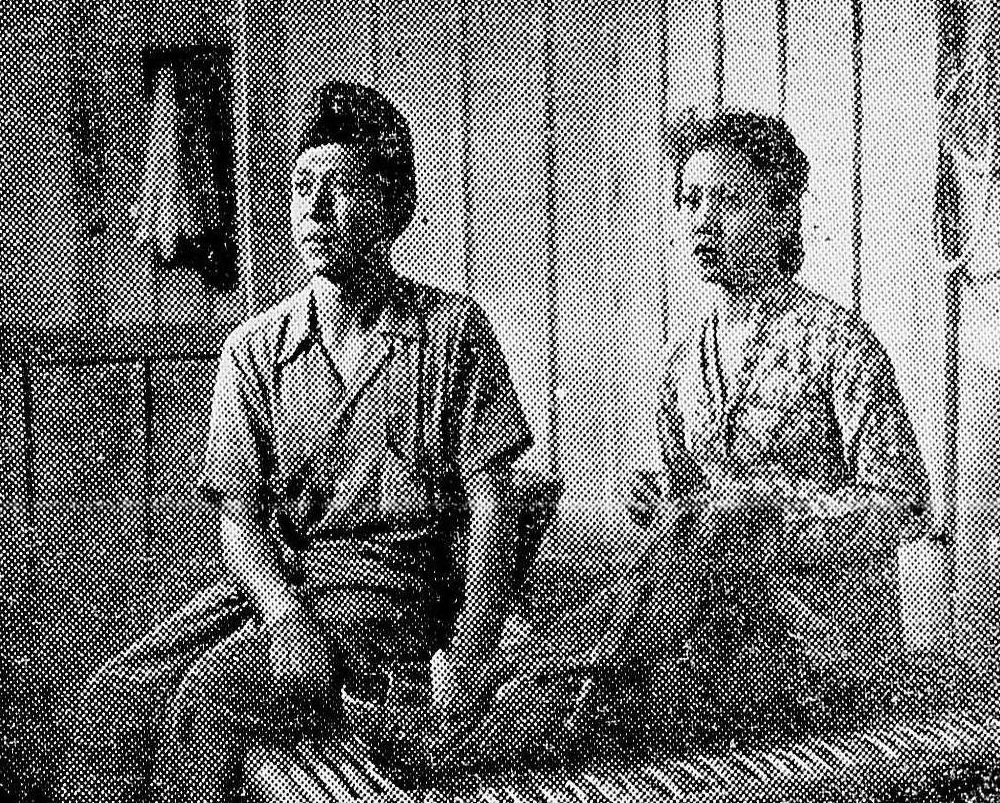
- A scene from Berdjoang
- Directed by: Rd. Ariffien
- Written by: Rd. Ariffien
- Starring: Mohamad Mochtar; Sambas; Dhalia; Kartolo; Chatir Harro
- Cinematography: Siat Yu Ming
- Production company: Nippon Eigasha
- Release date: 1943 (Dutch East Indies)
- Country: Dutch East Indies
- Language: Indonesian

Berdjoang (literally "struggle", also known under the title Hope of the South) is a 1943 film from the Japanese-occupied Dutch East Indies (now Indonesia). The film, produced by the Japanese studio Nippon Eigasha, is credited as having been directed by Rd. Ariffien, although Ariffien may have actually served as an assistant. Starring Mohamad Mochtar, Sambas, Dhalia, Kartolo, and Chatir Harro, it follows several villagers and their different approaches to Japanese military rule. The propaganda film was meant to draw Indonesians to enter a Japanese-sponsored army and survives, in part, in the Netherlands.

== Plot ==
In Legok, a Japanese spokesman gives a speech regarding the formation of military units for native Indonesians. Two village boys, the best friends Saman (Sambas) and Anang (Mohamad Mochtar), try to join the army. Saman is not accepted owing to a lame leg, but Anang begins training. Saman, meanwhile, begins working indirectly for the Japanese occupation government by taking up work at a food company.

While Anang is away, the university-educated Ahmad (Chatir Harro), a fellow villager, express interest in Anang's girlfriend, Saman's sister Hasanah (Dahlia). Hasanah is not interested as she considers him ill-mannered and lazy. She tells him he should join the army, something Ahmad refuses to do. Saman, who has proven himself with his diligence, is promoted and eventually marries his boss's daughter, Nani (R.A. Pulunggana).

One day, Anang – now a unit leader – returns to the village with several of his men. He sees that Saman has been unable to join the army and thus apologises, as he considers their actions as children responsible for Saman's injuries. Their discussion is interrupted by cries of "Thief!" from outside; they rush out and see that Ahmad has been caught stealing from Saman's factory. Although Saman hits Ahmad several times, he refuses to press charges against the thief. Anang then takes his leave to go back to the army.

== Production ==
The Empire of Japan began occupying the Dutch East Indies (now Indonesia) in early 1942. The country's film industry was essentially shut down: all but one film studio was closed. The Japanese film studio Nippon Eigasha established a branch in the Indies. This was the company which produced Berdjoang. The film was one of several Japanese propaganda films produced during the period; Berjoang was aimed at enticing Indonesians to join the army.

Berdjoang was produced by the Japanese-sponsored Nippon Eigasha. It is credited as having been written and directed by Rd. Ariffien, but the Indonesian film historian Misbach Yusa Biran suggests that a Japanese man named Kurata Bunjin was the actual director, with Rd. Ariffien as his assistant. It starred Mohamad Mochtar, Sambas, Dhalia, Kartolo, and Chatir Harro. Hajopan Bajo Angin was artistic director. The black-and-white film had Indonesian and Japanese-language dialogue. Filming started on 1 September 1943, with Siat Yu Ming on camera.

The film departed from the rising intellectual movement of works produced domestically in 1940 and 1941; these films had shown university students, depicted by well-educated actors, as heroes, while Berdjoang relegated the intellectual elite to the realm of petty criminals.

== Release and reception ==
Berdjoang was released in 1943. It was the only domestically produced feature film released in the Dutch East Indies; Nippon Eigasha and Persafi did, however, make five short films as well as several newsreels before the Japanese surrendered in August 1945.

The film is one of several Japanese propaganda films have survived, in whole or in part, at the Netherlands Government Information Service. A ten-minute reel, thought to be the fourth act, was discovered in Jakarta and brought to the Netherlands, where it is now stored at the Netherlands Institute for Sound and Vision. This extract was screened at the 1997 Yamagata International Documentary Film Festival, during a feature on Japanese newsreels and other productions during the occupation of the Indies.

== Works cited ==
- "Berdjoang". filmindonesia.or.id (in Indonesian). Jakarta: Konfidan Foundation. Archived from the original on 2 December 2013.
- "Berdjoang". beeldengeluid.nl (in Dutch). Netherlands Institute for Sound and Vision. Archived from the original on 4 March 2016.
- Biran, Misbach Yusa (2009). Sejarah Film 1900–1950: Bikin Film di Jawa [History of Film 1900–1950: Making Films in Java] (in Indonesian). Jakarta: Komunitas Bamboo working with the Jakarta Art Council. ISBN 978-979-3731-58-2.
- "Indonesia under Japanese Military Rule". Yamagata: Yamagata International Documentary Film Festival. Archived from the original on 4 March 2016.
