= Tan's Film =

Dutch East Indies film production company

Tan's Film Company Tan's Film Coy.
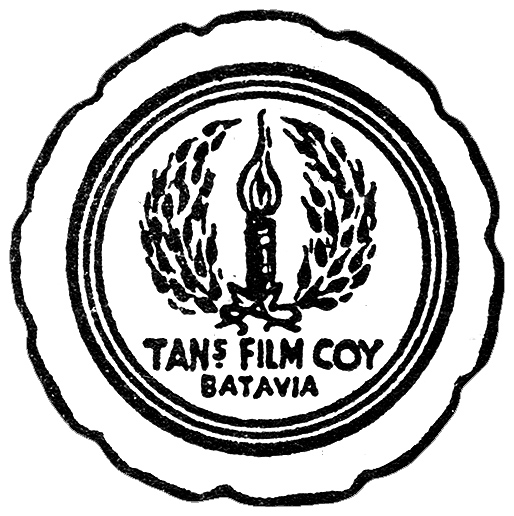
- Type: Private
- Industry: Film
- Founded: Batavia, Dutch East Indies (1 September 1929)
- Defunct: 1942
- Fate: Dissolved
- Successor: Tan & Wong Brothers
- Headquarters: Batavia, Dutch East Indies
- Area served: Dutch East Indies
- Key people: Tan Khoen Yauw (owner); Tan Khoen Hian (owner)
- Products: Motion pictures

Tan's Film was a film production house in the Dutch East Indies (modern Indonesia). Established by the brothers Tan Khoen Yauw and Tan Khoen Hian on September 1, 1929, its films were mostly targeted at native ethnic groups. Starting with Njai Dasima in 1929, the company released fifteen movies before ultimately being dissolved after the Japanese occupation. The Tans and the Wong brothers established Tan & Wong Bros in 1948 to continue this work.

== History ==
=== First iteration ===
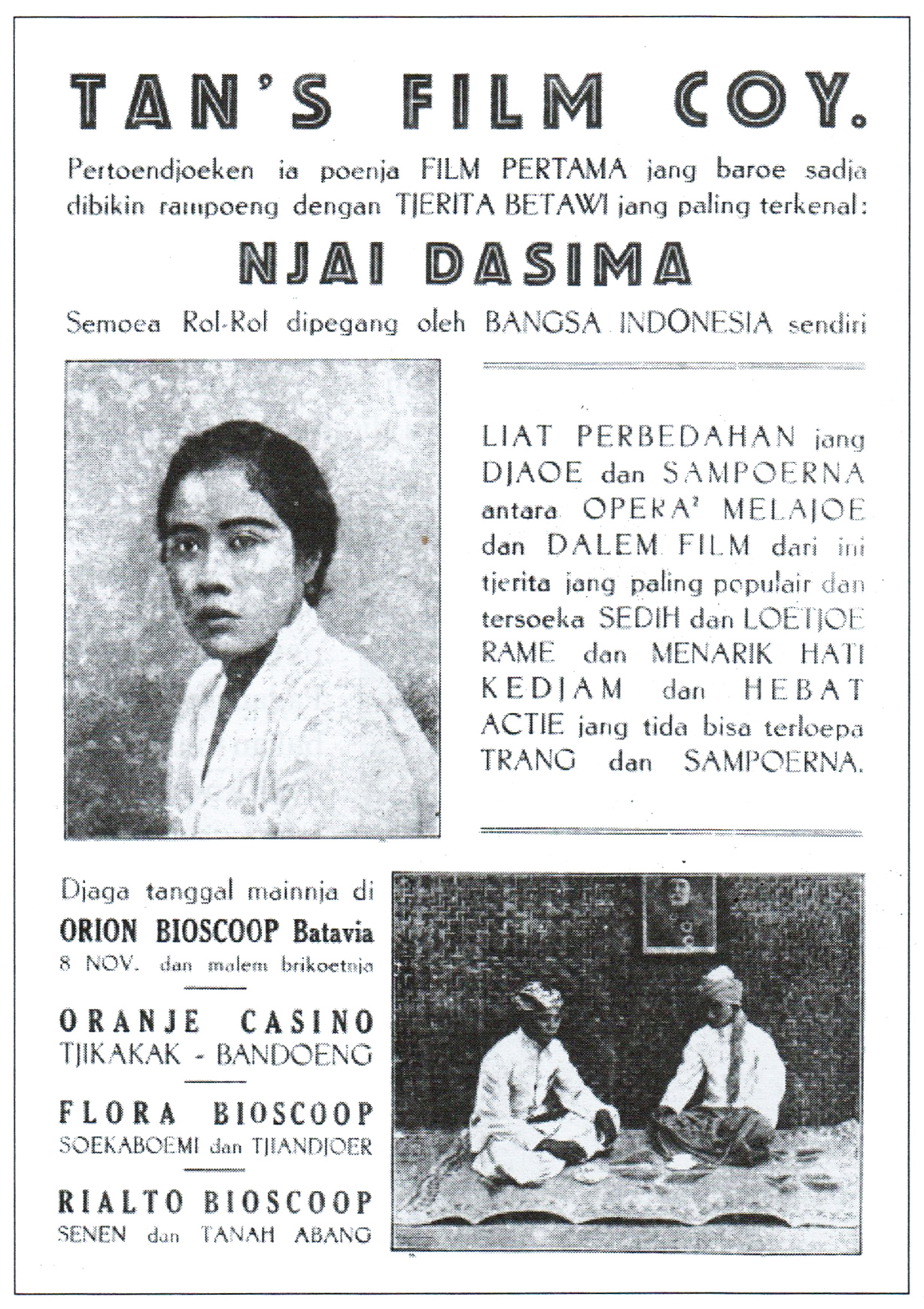
Poster for Njai Dasima, Tan's first production

Tan's Film Company was established by Tan Khoen Yauw and his brother Tan Khoen Hian on September 1, 1929. It was one of three studios established in the Dutch East Indies that year, together with Nansing Film Corporation and another Chinese-owned studio. Tan's established a large studio building on Defensielijn v.d. Bosch (now Bungur Besar Raya Street). It had several divisions, including costuming, filming, and decor.

The Tans, who had been raised in Kwitang, Batavia (modern day Jakarta) and grown up in close interaction with native ethnic groups, targeted the studio at lower-class viewers, mostly native. This was accomplished through adapting Malay tonil (stage plays) which had been proven successful. Tan's was not the first studio with this target audience, as George Krugers' Krugers Filmbedrijf had previously released Eulis Atjih (1927) with native audiences in mind.

Tan's Film released its first film, the silent Njai Dasima, in November 1929. The work was an adaptation of the 1896 novel Tjerita Njai Dasima (Story of Njai Dasima), written by G. Francis, which had previously been made into a tonil. It was a commercial success to the point that the Indonesian film historian, Misbach Yusa Biran, writes that a cinema could make up several days losses with a single showing of the film. Njai Dasima was followed by two further adaptations of tonils, the action film Si Ronda and the romance Melati van Agam (Jasmine of Agam), as well as the second part to the story, also entitled Njai Dasima, and sequel Nancy Bikin Pembalesan, in 1930. The two Njai Dasima continuations and Melati van Java were commercial successes.

Owing to rising production costs, Tan's closed shop after the production of a talkie version of Njai Dasima in 1932. This version had Krugers as its cameraman and Bachtiar Effendi as director; another of Krugers' films, Huwen op Bevel (Forced to Marry; 1932) had been released by Tan's after Krugers ran out of funds.

=== Second iteration ===
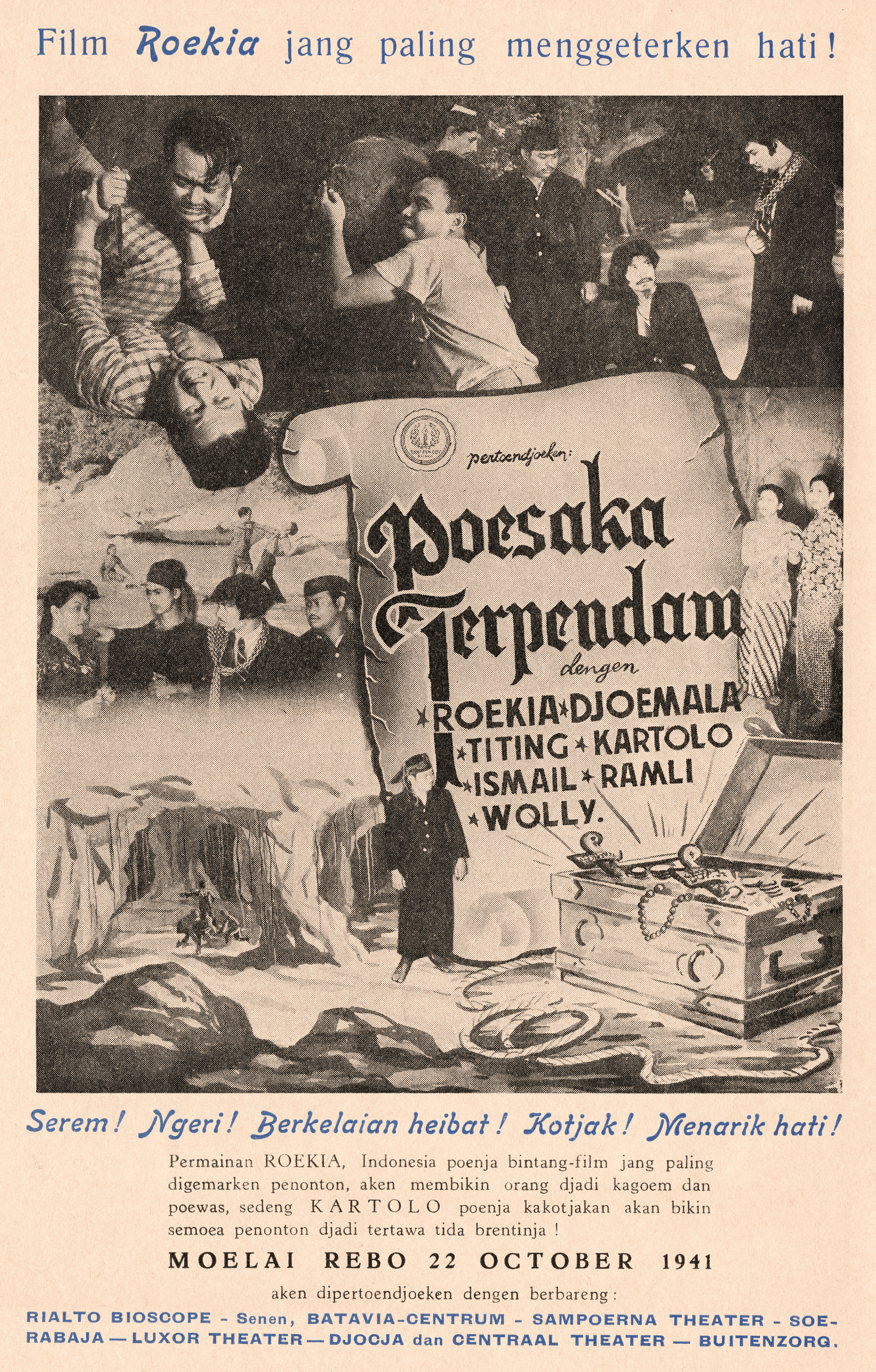
Magazine advertisement for Poesaka Terpendam, Tan's penultimate film

In 1938 Tan Khoen Hian joined with the American-born Chinese directors Othniel and Joshua Wong to establish a reincarnation of Tan's Film, entitled Tan's Film Coy. Tan served primarily as a financial backer, while the Wong brothers handled day-to-day matters. The new Tan's Film's first production, Fatima (1938), followed closely behind the highly successful Terang Boelan, released by the Dutch Indies Film Syndicate (Algemeen Nederlandsch Indisch Filmsyndicaat, or ANIF) in 1937, and used many of the same aspects; this included the same screenwriter, the same stars, and the same musicians. Roekiah, the female lead of Terang Boelan, was given a 150 gulden monthly fee, with another 50 gulden for her husband; this was twice as much as ANIF had paid her. Fatima was very successful, earning 200,000 gulden on a 7,000 gulden investment. In 1939 Tan's Film released Gagak Item (Black Raven); the story, still based in part on that of Terang Boelan, featured a Zorro-like character called the Black Raven. The following April they released Siti Akbari, also influenced by Terang Boelan. Both later films were successes, although not as much as Fatima.

By 1940 Tan's Film was one of six film studios in the Indies; the establishment of new studios, inspired in part by the success of Fatima, continued into 1941. Under this pressure, especially that from Java Industrial Film Coy., the performance of Tan's Film's releases began to suffer. Joshua Wong began working with Oriental Film, and Rd. Mochtar – the leading male actor for Tan's Film since Fatima – left over a wage dispute. The screenwriter Saeroen also left the company in 1940. Production slowed drastically, to two releases a year.

After the commercial successes Roekihati and Sorga Ka Toedjoe (Seventh Heaven) were released in 1940, Tan's released Koeda Sembrani (The Enchanted Horse), which used a massive and expensive palace set. The following year Tan's released Poesaka Terpendam (Buried Treasure) and produced Aladin dengan Lampu Wasiat (Aladdin and the Magic Lamp), the latter of which reused the palace set. However, the Japanese occupation of the Indies beginning in early 1942 led to Tan's Film being shut down; Aladin dengan Lampu Wasiat would only be released in 1950, after the occupation and national revolution. In 1948 the Tan and Wong brothers would join to establish Tan & Wong Bros.

== List of films ==
The following list of films released by both incarnations of Tan's Film is derived from Biran (2009, pp. 379–387)

- Njai Dasima (1929/1930)
- Nancy Bikin Pembalesan (Nancy Takes Revenge; 1930)
- Melati van Agam (Jasmine of Agam; 1930)
- Si Ronda (1930)
- Huwen op Bevel (Forced to Marry; 1931)
- Njai Dasima (1932)
- Fatima (1938)
- Gagak Item (Black Raven; 1939)
- Siti Akbari (1940)
- Sorga Ka Toedjoe (Seventh Heaven; 1940)
- Roekihati (1940)
- Koeda Sembrani (Pegasus; 1941)
- Poesaka Terpendam (Buried Treasure; 1941)
- Aladin dengan Lampu Wasiat (Aladdin and the Magic Lamp; 1941)
