= Rd Mochtar =

Indonesian actor (born 1918)

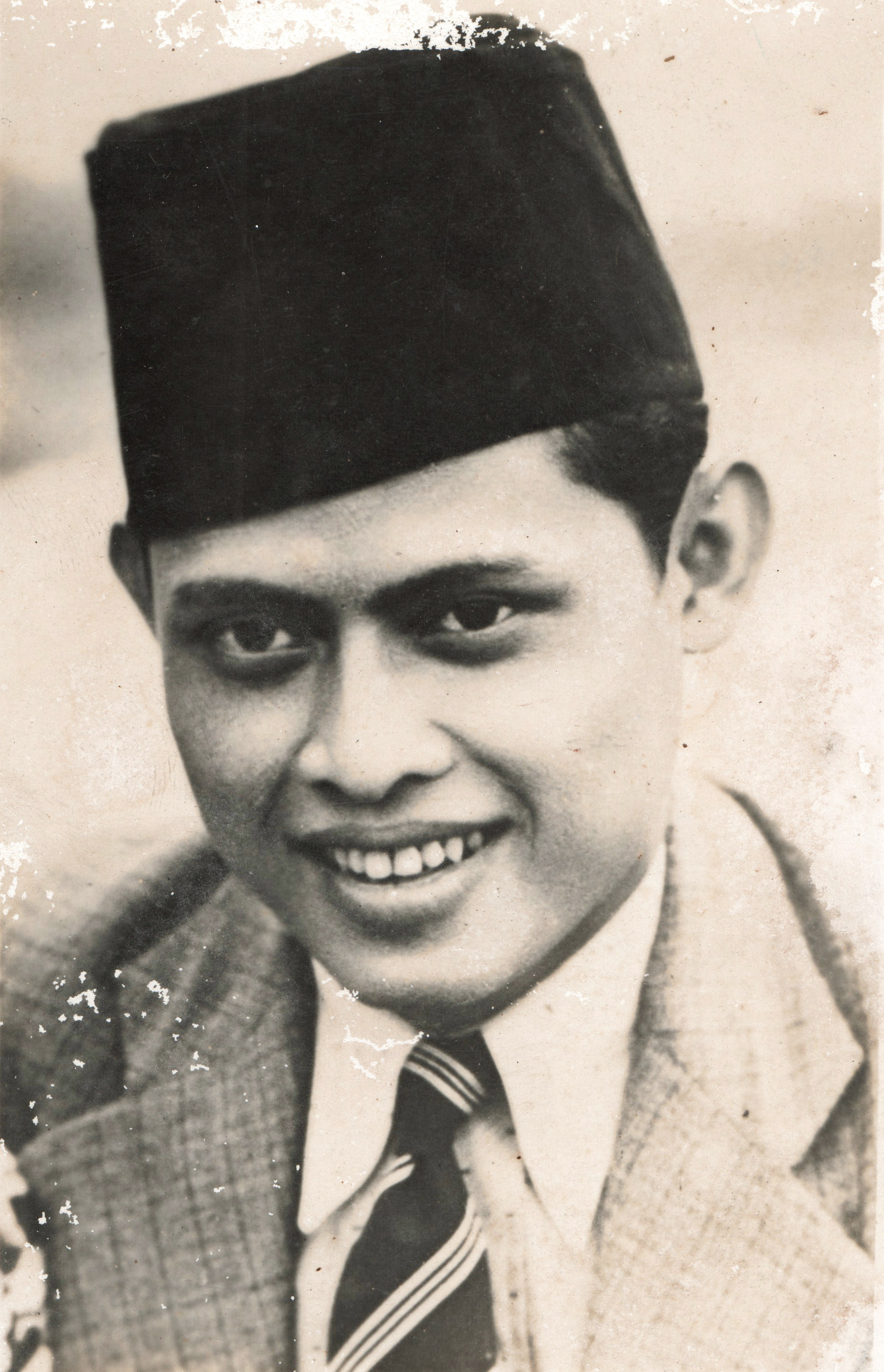
- Mochtar in Siti Akbari (1940)
- Born: 31 May 1918; Cianjur, West Java, Dutch East Indies
- Occupation: Actor
- Years active: 1935–1991
- Notable work: Pareh; Terang Boelan
- Spouse: Sukarsih (m. 1937)

Hajji Raden Mochtar (born 31 May 1918), often credited as Rd Mochtar, was an Indonesian actor. Of noble descent, Mochtar was discovered by Albert Balink and first cast in the commercial failure Pareh (1936). Rising to popularity after the release of Terang Boelan the following year, he spent nearly sixty years in film, while also becoming a businessman and farmer.

== Childhood and early career ==
Mochtar was born in Cianjur, West Java, on 31 May 1918. He was a Javanese of priyayi (noble) descent. He had a brother, Rd. Kosasih, an actor, and R. Sujetti Djuariah (born 1926), an actress. Mochtar did his elementary school studies at a Taman Siswa school in Bandung.

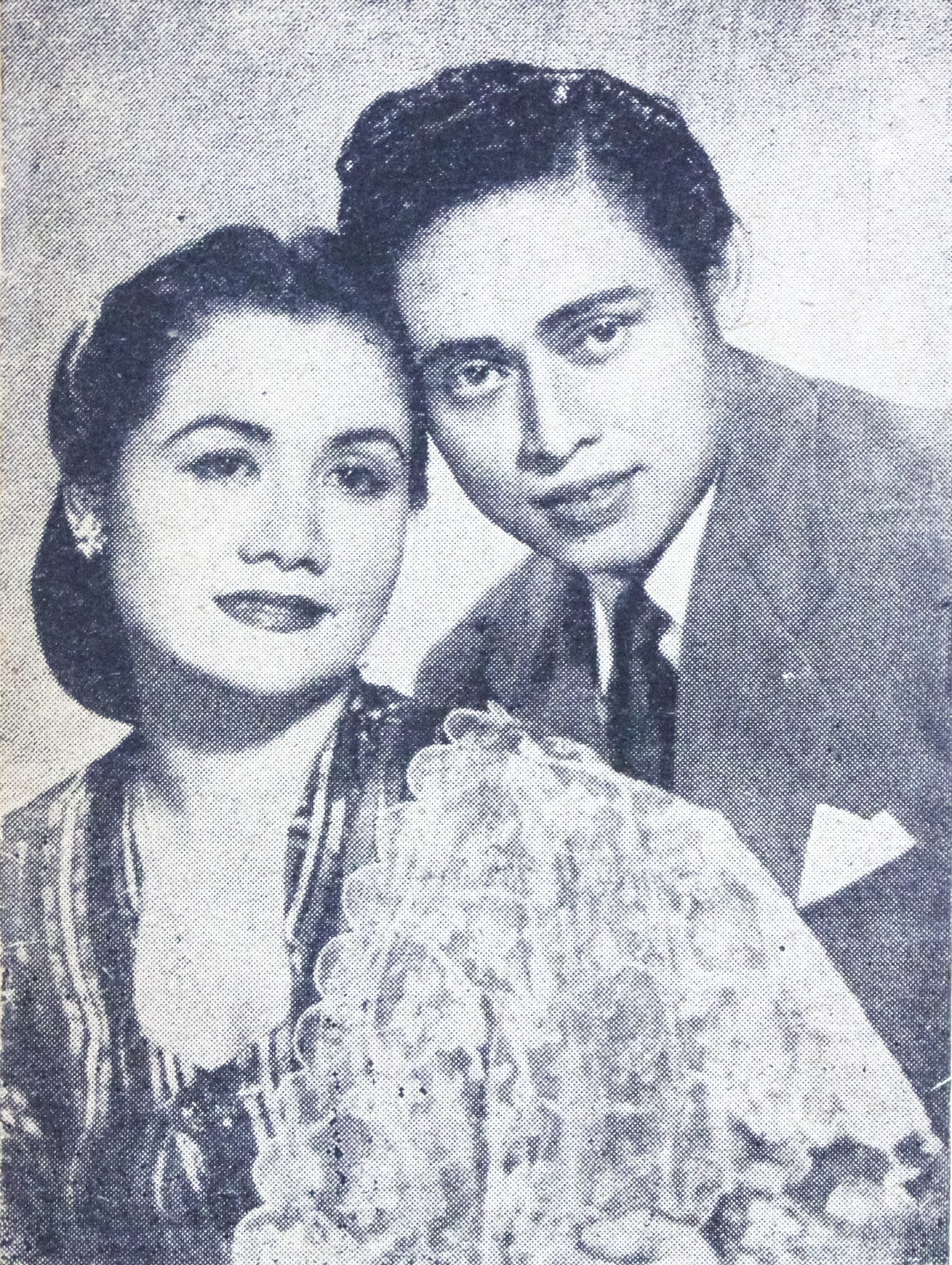
Mochtar and his wife, Sukarsih, in 1953

In 1935 Mochtar was cast in the leading role of Mahmud in Albert Balink's film Pareh. Balink was out with coffee with Joshua and Othniel Wong and saw Mochtar, whom he considered tall, strong, and handsome, driving by. Balink and the Wongs chased Mochtar in their car and caught him. For the film Mochtar was told to use the title Raden, which he and his family had already abandoned. According to the Indonesian anthropologist Albertus Budi Susanto, the emphasis on Mochtar's title was meant as a way to draw a higher-class audience. The film, which cost 75,000 gulden to produce, was a commercial failure. However, it was financially beneficial for Mochtar, who was paid a monthly retainer of 250 gulden.

Balink recalled Mochtar for his next film, Terang Boelan (Full Moon), in 1937. Although the role called for Mochtar to sing he was unable to do so. As such, the composer Ismail Marzuki was called to provide Mochtar's singing voice. The film was a commercial success, garnering over 200,000 Singapore dollars during its international release. This led to Mochtar becoming a bankable star and often playing alongside Roekiah. The film also played a role in the establishment of a star system in the country's cinema. Soon after the release of Terang Boelan Mochtar married the actress Sukarsih, whom he had met on the set of Pareh.

After the success of Terang Boelan and Balink's emigration to the United States, most of the cast – including Mochtar – were signed with Tan's Film. Mochtar's first film with the company, Fatima (1938), was a commercial success, earning 200,000 gulden on a 7,000 gulden budget. After making several further films, by 1940 Mochtar had left Tan's over a wage dispute. He made a further three films with Yo Kim Tjan's Populair Films before transferring to Action Film.

== Later career ==
During the Japanese occupation (1942–1945) and ensuing four-year revolution, Mochtar acted in several theatrical groups, including Terang Boelan, Bintang Soerabaja, and Pantai Warna. As the Indonesian film industry gained steam during the 1950s, Mochtar continued acting. Aside from Indonesian films, he also had a role in Rodrigo de Villa, by the Philippine company LVN Pictures.

In the late 1950s the local film industry ebbed and Mochtar became a businessman, then later a farmer. In the mid-1960s he went on the hajj to Mecca, and in the 1970s he began acting again. During this period he received awards from both the West Javan and Jakartan governments for his acting. He continued to be active in film until 1991.

== Filmography ==
Mochtar appeared in 69 films spanning a period of almost sixty years.

- Pareh (Rice; 1936)
- Terang Boelan (Full Moon; 1937)
- Fatima (1938)
- Siti Akbari (1940)
- Gagak Item (Black Raven; 1939)
- Garoeda Mas (Golden Garuda; 1941)
- Boedjoekan Iblis (Demons' Temptations; 1941)
- Moestika dari Djemar (1941)
- Bengawan Solo (1949)
- Terang Bulan (Moonlight; 1950)
- Sedap Malam (Sweetness of the Night; 1950)
- Bantam (1950)
- Rindu (Longing; 1951)
- Surjani Mulia (The Great Surjani; 1951)
- Sepandjang Malioboro (The Length of Malioboro; 1951)
- Marunda (1951)
- Main-Main Djadi Sungguhan (Acting... for Real; 1951)
- Dunia Gila (Crazy World; 1951)
- Hidup Baru (New Life; 1951)
- Rodrigo de Villa (1952)
- Leilani (1953)
- Gara-gara Hadiah (Because of a Gift; 1953)
- Pegawai Tinggi (Stately Employee; 1954)
- Gara-gara Djanda Muda (Because of a Young Widow; 1954)
- Berdjumpa Kembali (Meet Again; 1955)
- Hadiah 10.000 (10,000 Gifts; 1955)
- Gadis Sesat (Lost Maiden; 1955)
- Kamar Kosong (Empty Room; 1956)
- Harta Angker (Cursed Treasure; 1956)
- Djandjiku (My Promise; 1956)
- Wanita Indonesia (Indonesian Women; 1958)
- Tak Terduga (Unexpected; 1960)
- Limapuluh Megaton (Fifty Megatons; 1961)
- Asmara dan Wanita (Love and Women; 1961)
- Tauhid (1964)
- Singa Betina dari Marunda (The Lioness from Marunda; 1971)
- Si Gondrong (1971)
- Bengawan Solo (River of Love; 1971)
- Malin Kundang (Anak Durhaka) (Malin Kundang (Faithless Child); 1971)
- Deru Campur Debu (Dust with Dust; 1972)
- Dalam Sinar Matanya (In Her Eyes; 1972)
- Perkawinan (Marriage; 1972)
- Tokoh (Figure; 1973)
- Jembatan Merah (The Red Bridge; 1973)
- Ibu Sejati (True Mother; 1973)
- Gara-gara (Riot; 1973)
- Dosa di Atas Dosa (Sins Upon Sins; 1973)
- Mei Lan, Aku Cinta Padamu (I Love You Mei Lan; 1974)
- Si Doel Anak Modern (Doel the Modern Child; 1976)
- Sesuatu yang Indah (Something Beautiful; 1976)
- Remaja 76 (Teens of '76; 1976)
- Pembalasan Naga Sakti (The Holy Dragon's Revenge; 1976)
- Dukun Beranak (Dukun and Child; 1977)
- Balada Dua Jagoan (Ballad of Two Masters; 1977)
- Jangan Menangis Mama (Don't Cry, Mom; 1977)
- Hamil Muda (Young and Pregnant; 1977)
- Cobra (1977)
- Krakatau (1977)
- Karate Sabuk Hitam (Black Belt Karate; 1977)
- Remaja Idaman (The Perfect Teen; 1979)
- Di Sini Cinta Pertama Kali Bersemi (Here Love Bloomed for the First Time; 1980)
- Bercanda Dalam Duka (Laughing in Grief; 1981)
- Merenda Hari Esok (Preparing for Tomorrow; 1981)
- Tirai Malam Pengantin (Curtains for the Newlyweds; 1983)
- Sunan Kalijaga dan Syech Siti Jenar (Sunan Kalijaga and Syech Siti Jenar; 1985)
- Nyi Mas Gandasari (1989)
- Tutur Tinular (1989)
- Ketika Dia Pergi (When She Leaves; 1990)
- Tutur Tinular II (1991)
