= Union Films =

Defunct Indonesian film company

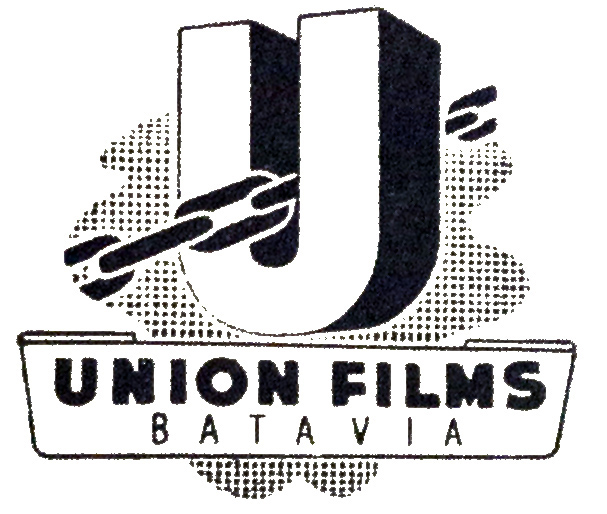
- Company type: Private
- Industry: Film
- Founded: Batavia, Dutch East Indies (1940)
- Defunct: 1942
- Headquarters: Batavia, Dutch East Indies
- Area served: Dutch East Indies

Union Films was a film production company located in Batavia, Dutch East Indies (now Jakarta, Indonesia). Established by ethnic Chinese businessmen Ang Hock Liem and Tjoa Ma Tjoen in 1940, it produced seven black-and-white films before it was dissolved in 1942; all are thought to be lost. The company's films were directed by four men, mostly ethnic Chinese, and launched the careers of actors such as Rendra Karno and Djoewariah.

Established during the revival of the Indies film industry, Union released its first film, Kedok Ketawa, in July 1940. This was followed by a series of films penned by Saeroen which were increasingly oriented towards the Indies' growing intelligentsia and attempted to distance themselves from the theatrical conventions which were common in the contemporary film industry. This continued after Saeroen left for Star Film in 1941, with Union's final two productions emphasising realism. Following the Japanese occupation of the Indies in March 1942, Union was dissolved, though its films continued to be screened into the mid-1940s.

== History ==
Following the commercial successes of Terang Boelan (Full Moon; 1937), Fatima (1938), and Alang-Alang (Grass; 1939), the film industry of the Dutch East Indies – which had been severely weakened by the Great Depression – was revived. Film production increased and, in 1940, four new production houses were opened, including Union Films. The company was funded by ethnic Chinese businessman Ang Hock Liem, who is credited as producer for the majority of the company's releases; daily operations, however, were handled by Tjoa Ma Tjoen. Union was headquartered in Prinsenlaan, Batavia (now Mangga Besar, Jakarta), and, according to a press release, established to "improve the quality of Indonesian art". (Note: Original: "... buat mengangkat derajatnya kesenian Indonesia.")

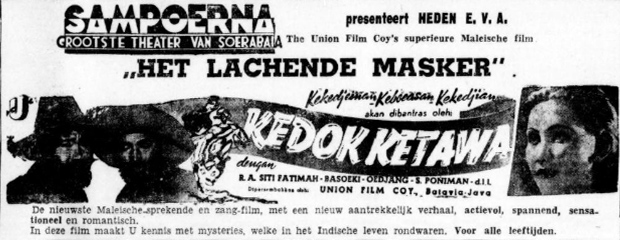
A Dutch-language advertisement for Union's first film, Kedok Ketawa (1940)

The fledgling Union's first film, Kedok Ketawa, was released in July 1940. Following a young couple who face off against criminals with the help of a masked bandit, this film was directed by Jo An Djan and starred Oedjang, Fatimah, and Basoeki Resobowo. It received positive reviews; the journalist Saeroen wrote in Pemandangan that the film's quality was comparable to imported Hollywood productions, and a review in Bataviaasch Nieuwsblad praised the cinematography. Following these positive reviews, Union hired Saeroen – who had previously written Terang Boelan and several works for Tan's Film – as a screenwriter. He made his debut for the company with Harta Berdarah, directed by new hires R Hu and Rd Ariffien, following Jo An Djan's departure for Populair's Film. The film, in which a young man convinces a miserly hajji to be more charitable, was released in October 1940 and starred the singer Soelastri and martial artist Zonder.

Union released their third production, Bajar dengan Djiwa, by February 1941. Directed by R Hu, this film – a drama in which a young woman is sold to a loan shark in order to pay her father's debt – marked the film debut of Djoewariah; she later became Union's leading lady. Ariffien, meanwhile, was tasked with directing Asmara Moerni, based on a script by Saeroen. Attempting to reach the educated audiences by casting a young doctor, Adnan Kapau Gani, opposite Djoewariah, this romance told of a young man who is ultimately able to marry his former maid after she receives an education. Released in April, the film received mixed reviews: one, in the Bataviaasch Nieuwsblad, found the film "fascinating", (Note: Original: "... boeiend ...") while another for the same paper considered the film dependent on the stage traditions which its advertisements had denounced.

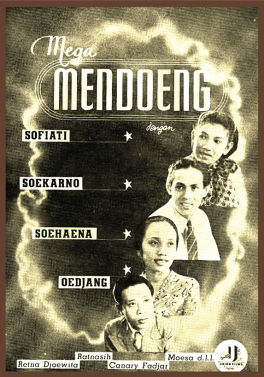
Advertisement for Union's last production, Mega Mendoeng (1942)

In July 1941 Union released Wanita dan Satria, a Djoewariah vehicle which follows a well-born womaniser who abuses his social status to gain women's trust before ultimately getting his comeuppance. In advertising Wanita dan Satria, the company again emphasised the non-theatrical background of the film's cast, which also included Moesa, Djoewita and Hidajat. The film received positive reviews; one, from the Soerabaijasch Handelsblad, wrote that Wanita dan Satria "gives a clear picture of the precarious position of Indonesian women and motivates the desire for a firmer outline of her rights in the Moslem society". (Note: Original: "... geeft een duidelijk beeld van de wankele positie der Indonesische vrouw en motiveert den drang naar een vaster omlijning harer rechten in de Mohammedaansche maatschappij.") This was the company's last film to be directed by Ariffien or written by Saeroen; both men migrated to rival company Star Film soon afterwards.

Hu remained with Union and directed the company's next production, Soeara Berbisa, with peranakan sound technician Boen Kin Nam serving as assistant director. Written by Djojopranoto, the work followed two young men who compete for the love of a woman before learning that they are long-lost brothers. Djoewita had left the company at this point, and the studio hired Raden Soekarno for the leading role of this late 1941 release. The company's final completed production, Mega Mendoeng, was directed by Boen and announced soon after shooting for Soeara Berbisa had begun. This film, a romance starring Soekarno and new find Sofiati, was released in early 1942. In producing both films, Union emphasised realism and targeted educated audiences.

By the end of 1941, the government of the Dutch East Indies were concerned that Empire of Japan could invade the colony. This fear reached the general populace, and the February 1942 edition of the film magazine Pertjatoeran Doenia dan Film reported that several studios would move away from the colonial capital of Batavia or go on a production hiatus. Union, though already beginning production of a film set in the Majapahit era titled Damar Woelan, was forced to stop filming. When the Japanese occupied the Indies in March 1942, Union was closed, never to reopen.

Aside from Ariffien, who continued directing into the 1960s, none of Union's directors or producers returned to the film industry after the conclusion of the Japanese occupation in 1945. Several actors continued their careers. Djoewariah, for instance, made her first film after leaving Union, Sehidup Semati (One Life, One Death), in 1949, and continued acting until the mid-1950s. Soekarno's career lasted through the 1970s; he was mostly credited as Rendra Karno after changing his name in the 1950s. Others had careers behind the screen; Kedok Ketawa star Basoeki Resobowo, for instance, became art director on films such as Darah dan Doa (The Long March; 1950).

== Filmography ==
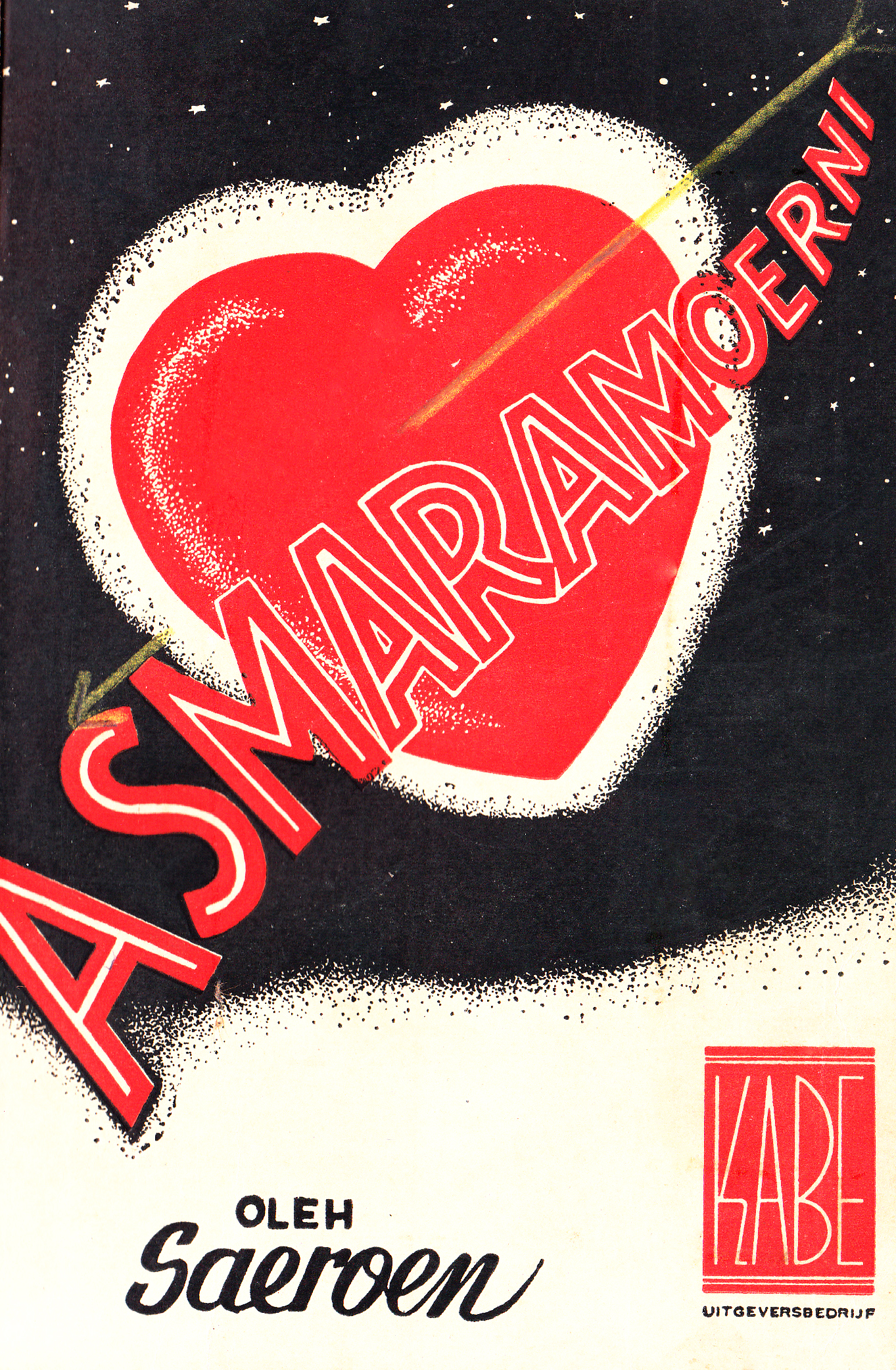
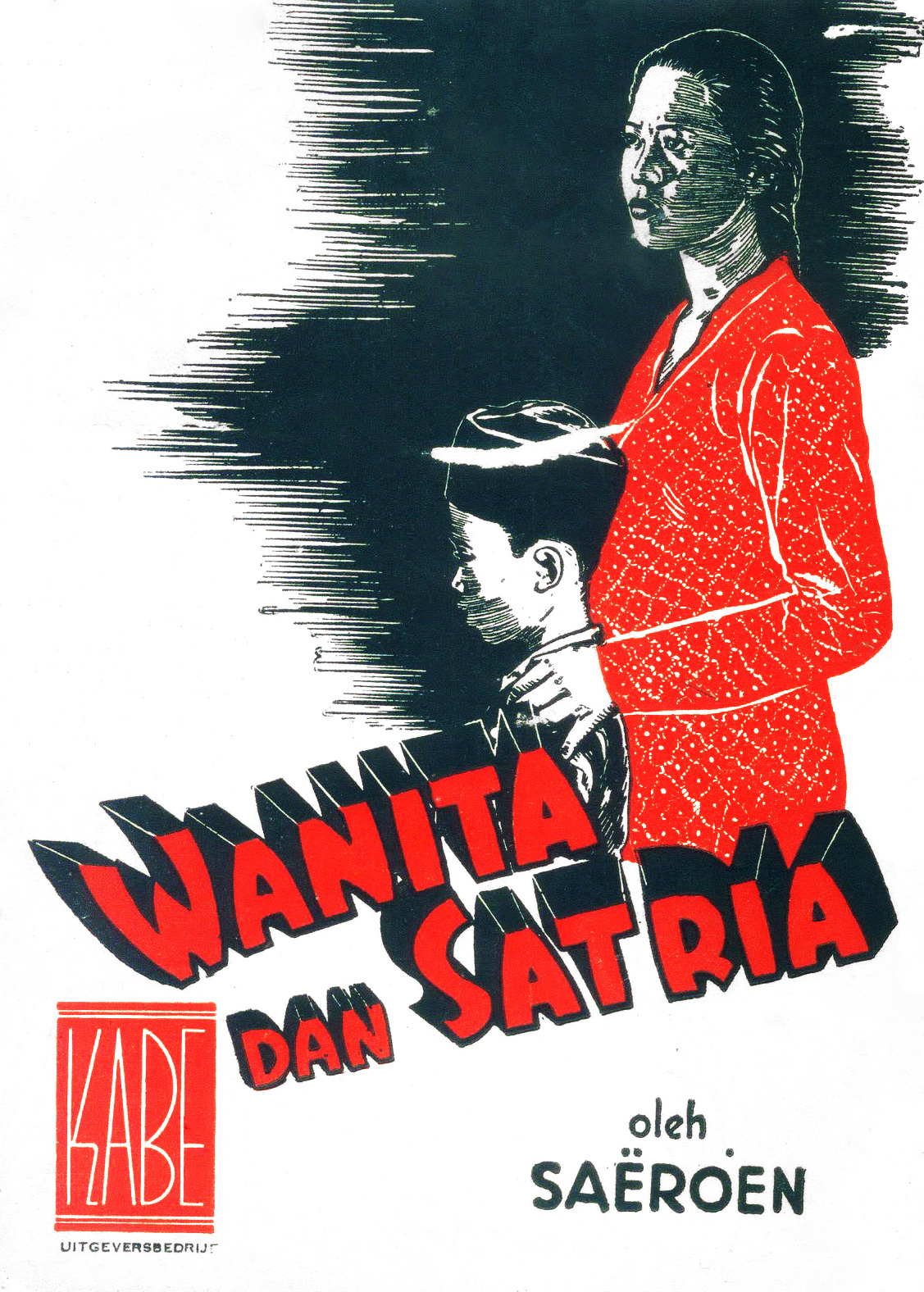
Covers of two novelisations of Union productions: Asmara Moerni (left) and Wanita dan Satria (both Kolff-Buning, 1941)

In a period of two years, Union released seven films; all were feature length, made in black-and-white, and received wide releases in the Dutch East Indies. Several were screened in nearby Singapore, including Bajar dengan Djiwa and Asmara Moerni. Though its films were screened at least into the 1940s, (Note: Asmara Moerni, for instance, was screened until at least November 1945 (Soeara Merdeka 1945, Pilem), and Soeara Berbisa played as late as February 1949 (Pelita Rakjat 1949, (untitled)).) the company's output is likely lost. (Note: Movies were then shot on flammable and unstable nitrate film, and after a fire destroyed much of Produksi Film Negara's warehouse in 1952, old films shot on nitrate were deliberately destroyed (Biran 2012, p. 291). As such, the American visual anthropologist Karl G. Heider suggests that all Indonesian films from before 1950 are lost (Heider 1991, p. 14) However, J.B. Kristanto's Katalog Film Indonesia records several as having survived at Sinematek Indonesia's archives, and the film historian Misbach Yusa Biran writes that several Japanese propaganda films have survived at the Netherlands Government Information Service (Biran 2009, p. 351).)

- Kedok Ketawa (Laughing Mask; 1940)
- Harta Berdarah (Bloody Treasure; 1940)
- Bajar dengan Djiwa (Pay with [One's] Soul; 1941)
- Asmara Moerni (True Love; 1941)
- Wanita dan Satria (The Woman and the Hero; 1941)
- Soeara Berbisa (Venomous Voice; 1941)
- Mega Mendoeng (1942)

== See also ==
- List of lost films

== Works cited ==
- "Ang Hock Liem". filmindonesia.or.id (in Indonesian). Jakarta: Konfiden Foundation. Archived from the original on 23 April 2014.
- "Bajar dengan Djiwa". filmindonesia.or.id (in Indonesian). Jakarta: Konfiden Foundation. Archived from the original on 2 December 2013.
- "Basuki Resobowo". filmindonesia.or.id (in Indonesian). Jakarta: Konfiden Foundation. Archived from the original on 22 April 2014.
- Biran, Misbach Yusa, ed. (1979). Apa Siapa Orang Film Indonesia 1926–1978 [What and Who: Film Figures in Indonesia, 1926–1978] (in Indonesian). Jakarta: Sinematek Indonesia. OCLC 6655859.
- Biran, Misbach Yusa (2009). Sejarah Film 1900–1950: Bikin Film di Jawa [History of Film 1900–1950: Making Films in Java] (in Indonesian). Jakarta: Komunitas Bamboo working with the Jakarta Art Council. ISBN 978-979-3731-58-2.
- Biran, Misbach Yusa (2012). "Film di Masa Kolonial" [Film in the Colonial Period]. Indonesia dalam Arus Sejarah: Masa Pergerakan Kebangsaan [Indonesia in the Flow of Time: The Nationalist Movement] (in Indonesian). Vol. V. Ministry of Education and Culture. pp. 268–93. ISBN 978-979-9226-97-6.
- "Filmaankondiging Cinema Palace: Kedok Ketawa" [Film at Cinema Palace: Kedok Ketawa]. Bataviaasch Nieuwsblad (in Dutch). Batavia: Kolff & Co. 20 July 1940. p. 3.
- "Filmaankondigingen Orion: 'Asmara Moerni'" [Orion Film Announcements: 'Asmara Moerni']. Bataviaasch Nieuwsblad (in Dutch). Batavia: Kolff & Co. 1 May 1941. p. 11. Archived from the original on 8 December 2019.
- "Harta Berdarah". filmindonesia.or.id (in Indonesian). Jakarta: Konfiden Foundation. Archived from the original on 2 December 2013.
- Heider, Karl G (1991). Indonesian Cinema: National Culture on Screen. Honolulu: University of Hawaii Press. ISBN 978-0-8248-1367-3.
- "Iets over de Maleische Film" [Thoughts on Malay Films]. Bataviaasch Nieuwsblad (in Dutch). Batavia: Kolff & Co. 8 May 1941. p. 10. Archived from the original on 8 December 2019.
- "Kedok Ketawa". Soerabaijasch Handelsblad (in Dutch). Surabaya: Kolff & Co. 12 September 1940. p. 10.
- "Kedok Ketawa". filmindonesia.or.id (in Indonesian). Jakarta: Konfiden Foundation. Archived from the original on 2 December 2013.
- Millet, Raphaël (2006). Singapore Cinema. Singapore: Editions Didier Millet. ISBN 978-981-4155-42-7.
- "Pilem" [Films]. Soeara Merdeka (in Indonesian). Semarang. 7 November 1945. p. 4. Archived from the original on 11 January 2014.
- Saeroen (1941). Asmara Moerni [True Romance] (in Indonesian). Yogyakarta: Kolff-Buning. OCLC 29049476. (book acquired from the collection of Museum Tamansiswa Dewantara Kirti Griya, Yogyakarta)
- "Sampoerna 'Wanita dan Satria'". Soerabaijasch Handelsblad (in Dutch). Surabaya: Kolff & Co. 11 September 1941. p. 2.
- Sardiman (2008). Guru Bangsa: Sebuah Biografi Jenderal Sudirman [Teacher of the People: A Biography of General Sudirman] (in Indonesian). Yogyakarta: Ombak. ISBN 978-979-3472-92-8.
- "Soeara Berbisa". filmindonesia.or.id (in Indonesian). Jakarta: Konfiden Foundation. Archived from the original on 10 November 2013.
- "Studio Nieuws" [Studio News]. Pertjatoeran Doenia Dan Film (in Indonesian). 1 (9). Batavia: 18–20. February 1942.
- "Tirai Terbentang" [Open Curtains]. Pertjatoeran Doenia Dan Film (in Indonesian). 1 (7). Batavia: 28–29. December 1941.
- "(Untitled)". Bataviaasch Nieuwsblad (in Dutch). 8 February 1941. p. 12.
- "(untitled)". Soerabaijasch Handelsblad. Surabaya. 29 October 1940. p. 7.
- "(untitled)". The Straits Times. Singapore. 29 August 1941. p. 6.
- "(untitled)". Pelita Rakjat (in Indonesian). Surabaya. 9 February 1949. p. 2. Archived from the original on 17 May 2014.
- "Warta dari Studio" [Reports from the Studios]. Pertjatoeran Doenia Dan Film (in Indonesian). 1 (3). Batavia: 28–31. August 1941.
- "Warta dari Studio" [Reports from the Studios]. Pertjatoeran Doenia Dan Film (in Indonesian). 1 (4). Batavia: 26–28. September 1941.
