= Bajar dengan Djiwa =

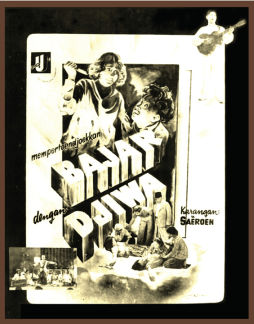
- Poster
- Directed by: R Hu
- Screenplay by: Saeroen
- Produced by: Ang Hock Liem
- Starring: A Bakar; Djoewariah; O Parma; Oedjang; RS Fatimah; Soelastri; Zonder
- Production company: Union Films
- Release date: February 1941 (Dutch East Indies)
- Country: Dutch East Indies
- Language: Indonesian

Bajar dengan Djiwa (Indonesian pronunciation: [ˌbajar dəˌŋan ˈd͡ʒiwa]; Perfected Spelling: Bayar dengan Jiwa; Indonesian for "Pay with [One's] Soul") is a believed lost 1941 film from the Dutch East Indies (modern day Indonesia). Directed by R Hu and produced by Ang Hock Liem, it starred A Bakar, Djoewariah, O Parma, Oedjang, RS Fatimah, Soelastri, and Zonder. The story centers on two families torn apart by finances and clashes of personality.

The third film produced by Union Films, Bajar dengan Djiwa featured many actors who had previously appeared in the company's works. It was released by February 1941. Advertisements emphasised the realism of the story, and reviewers praised the film's acting, romance, and humour. Screenings continued until at least 1943, more than a year after Union was closed following the Japanese occupation.

== Plot ==
Bajar dengan Djiwa follows the interactions of several groups of people. Husband and wife Basuki (Zonder) and Suryati (Nji Soelastri) clash because of their different personalities: the former is a thinker concerned with the state of society, while the latter only thinks of herself. Meanwhile, Umar (Oedjang) and Supini (RS Fatimah) clash over Umar's wasteful nature; eventually, he sinks so far into debt that he must sell his daughter, Djuliah (Djoewariah), to a loan shark named Asnan (O. Parma), a move which breaks the heart of Djuliah's boyfriend Ruhiyat (A Bakar). Other scenes include comic interactions between two servants, Icah (Ijem) and Djemblug (Komung).

== Production ==
Bajar dengan Djiwa was directed by R Hu for Union Films. It was Hu's second film for the company; he had already completed one film for the company, Harta Berdarah (Bloody Treasure; 1941), in collaboration with Rd Ariffien. The film, Union's third, was produced by its head, Ang Hock Liem. The story was written by journalist Saeroen, who had joined Union with Harta Berdarah after previously finding success with Tan's Film.

This black-and-white film starred A Bakar, Djoewariah, O Parma, Oedjang, RS Fatimah, Soelastri, and Zonder. It also included Itjang Ali, Haroen, Oesman, Komoeng, Ijem, and Moesa. Many of these actors, including Soelastri and Fatimah, had been with Union since its first production, Kedok Ketawa (The Laughing Mask), in 1940. Others, including Moesa and Zonder, had made their debuts in Harta Berdarah. Djoewariah, a stage actress and keroncong singer, was a new hire.

== Release and reception ==
Bajar dengan Djiwa, produced in 1940, was released by February 1941. By July 1941 the film was being screened in Singapore, then part of British Malaya. A novelisation of the film, written by Saeroen, was published by the Yogyakarta-based Kolff-Buning. In the East Indies, children under age 17 were prohibited from viewing. Advertisements, some which referred to the film with the Dutch title Met den Dood Betaald, emphasised the film's "realistic" depiction of a married life.

A review in the Java Bode found that Bajar dengan Djiwa was one of the Best Malay films yet made, with "almost no stiffness and woodenness" in the acting. (Note: Original: "... er is bijna geen stijfheid en houterigheid") Another review, in the Nieuws van den Dag voor Nederlandsch-Indië, described the film as "striking proof" (Note: Original: "... treffend bewijs") of Saeroen's knowledge of indigenous society and praised the film's romance and humour.

== Legacy ==
After Bajar Dengan Djiwa, Union produced a further five films; all but one were directed by Hu or Ariffien. Saeroen wrote two of them, leaving for Star Film following Wanita dan Satria (1941). Much of the cast remained with Union for several productions. The company's subsequent production, Asmara Moerni (1941), for instance, had Djoewariah in the leading role, alongside a new hire (the doctor Adnan Kapau Gani). Union Films was ultimately dissolved following the Japanese occupation of the Dutch East Indies in March 1942. In 2011 Ade Irwansyah of Tabloid Bintang listed the poster for Bajar Dengan Djiwa as one of the best Indonesian film posters of all time.

Bajar Dengan Djiwa was screened as late as October 1943, but is now probably lost. In common with the rest of the world at the time, movies in the Indies were shot on highly flammable nitrate film, and after a fire destroyed much of Produksi Film Negara's warehouse in 1952, old Indies films shot on nitrate were deliberately destroyed. As such, American visual anthropologist Karl G. Heider suggests that all Indonesian films from before 1950 are lost. However, JB Kristanto's Katalog Film Indonesia (Indonesian Film Catalogue) records several as having survived at Sinematek Indonesia's archives, and the film historian Misbach Yusa Biran writes that some Japanese propaganda films can be found at the Netherlands Government Information Service.

== Works cited ==
- "Asmara Moerni". filmindonesia.or.id (in Indonesian). Jakarta: Konfiden Foundation. Archived from the original on 2 December 2013.
- "Bajar dengan Djiwa". filmindonesia.or.id (in Indonesian). Jakarta: Konfiden Foundation. Archived from the original on 2 December 2013.
- Barnard, Timothy P. (February 2010). "Film Melayu: Nationalism, Modernity and Film in a pre-World War Two Malay Magazine". Journal of Southeast Asian Studies. 41 (1). Singapore: McGraw-Hill Far Eastern Publishers: 47–70. doi:10.1017/S0022463409990257. ISSN 0022-4634. S2CID 162484792.
- Biran, Misbach Yusa, ed. (1979). Apa Siapa Orang Film Indonesia 1926–1978 [What and Who: Film Figures in Indonesia, 1926–1978]. Sinematek Indonesia. OCLC 6655859.
- Biran, Misbach Yusa (2009). Sejarah Film 1900–1950: Bikin Film di Jawa [History of Film 1900–1950: Making Films in Java] (in Indonesian). Jakarta: Komunitas Bamboo working with the Jakarta Art Council. ISBN 978-979-3731-58-2.
- Biran, Misbach Yusa (2012). "Film di Masa Kolonial" [Film in the Colonial Period]. Indonesia dalam Arus Sejarah: Masa Pergerakan Kebangsaan [Indonesia in the Flow of Time: The Nationalist Movement] (in Indonesian). Vol. V. Ministry of Education and Culture. pp. 268–93. ISBN 978-979-9226-97-6.
- "Gunseibu Eiga Kan" [Screening in Theatres]. Kita-Sumatora-Sinbun (in Indonesian). 21 October 1943. p. 2. Archived from the original on 11 August 2014.
- "Harta Berdarah". filmindonesia.or.id (in Indonesian). Jakarta: Konfiden Foundation. Archived from the original on 2 December 2013.
- Heider, Karl G (1991). Indonesian Cinema: National Culture on Screen. Honolulu: University of Hawaii Press. ISBN 978-0-8248-1367-3.
- Irwansyah, Ade (8 March 2011). "20 Poster Film Indonesia Terbaik Sepanjang Massa (IMHO)" [20 Best Indonesian Movie Posters of All Time (IMHO)]. Tabloid Bintang (in Indonesian). Archived from the original on 25 June 2012.
- "Kedok Ketawa". filmindonesia.or.id (in Indonesian). Jakarta: Konfiden Foundation. Archived from the original on 2 December 2013.
- Millet, Raphaël (2006). Singapore Cinema. Singapore: Editions Didier Millet. ISBN 978-981-4155-42-7.
- "Moesa". filmindonesia.or.id (in Indonesian). Jakarta: Konfiden Foundation. Archived from the original on 14 May 2014.
- Saeroen (1940). Harta Berdarah [Bloody Treasure] (in Indonesian). Yogyakarta: Kolff-Buning. OCLC 621593610. (book acquired from the collection of Museum Tamansiswa Dewantara Kirti Griya, Yogyakarta)
- "(Untitled)". Bataviaasch Nieuwsblad (in Dutch). 8 February 1941. p. 12. Archived from the original on 28 July 2013.
- "(Untitled)". De Sumatra Post (in Dutch). 4 March 1941. p. 10. Archived from the original on 28 July 2013.
