= Kedok Ketawa =

1940 action film

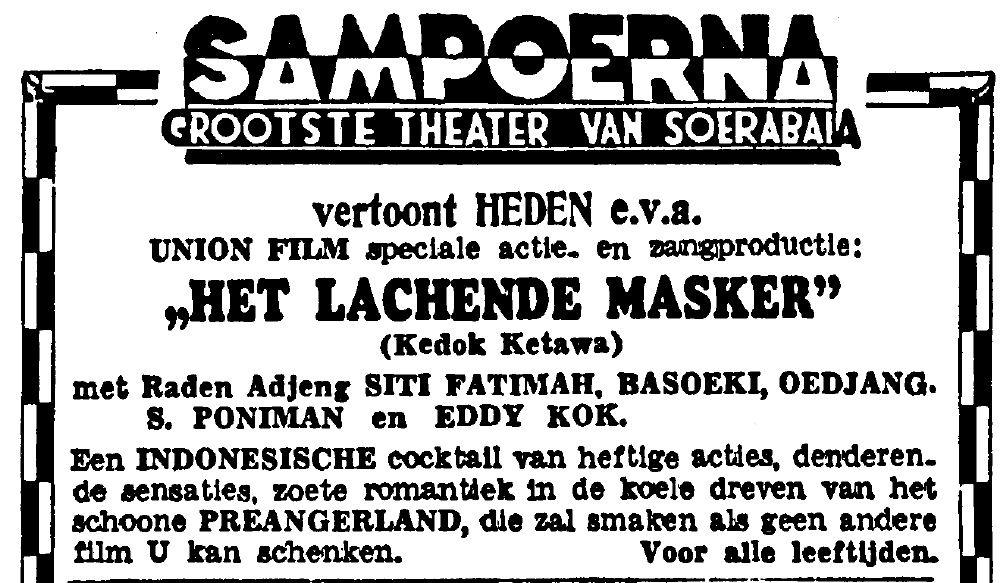
- A newspaper advertisement for Kedok Ketawa from Surabaya
- Directed by: Jo An Djan
- Starring: Oedjang; Fatimah; Basoeki Resobowo
- Music by: S Poniman
- Production company: Union Films
- Release date: July 1940 (Dutch East Indies)
- Country: Dutch East Indies
- Language: Indonesian

Kedok Ketawa ([kəˈdɔk̚ kəˈtawa]; Indonesian for 'The Laughing Mask', also known by the Dutch title Het Lachende Masker) is a 1940 action film from the Dutch East Indies (now Indonesia). Union Films' first production, it was directed by Jo An Djan. Starring Basoeki Resobowo, Fatimah, and Oedjang, the film follows a young couple who fight off criminals with the help of a masked man.

Advertised as an "Indonesian cocktail of violent actions ... and sweet romance", Kedok Ketawa received positive reviews, particularly for its cinematography. Following the success of the film, Union produced another six works before being shut down in early 1942 during the Japanese occupation. The film, screened until at least August 1944, may be lost.

== Plot ==
In Cibodas, Banten, a young woman named Minarsih (Fatimah) is rescued from four thugs by the painter Basuki (Basoeki Resobowo). They fall in love and begin planning their life together. However, a rich man interested in taking Minarsih to be his wife sends a gang to kidnap her. Basuki is unable to repel them, but is soon joined by a masked vigilante known only as "The Laughing Mask" (Oedjang), who has almost supernatural fighting abilities. After two battles with the gang, Basuki and The Laughing Mask are victorious. Basuki and Minarsih can live together in peace.

== Production ==
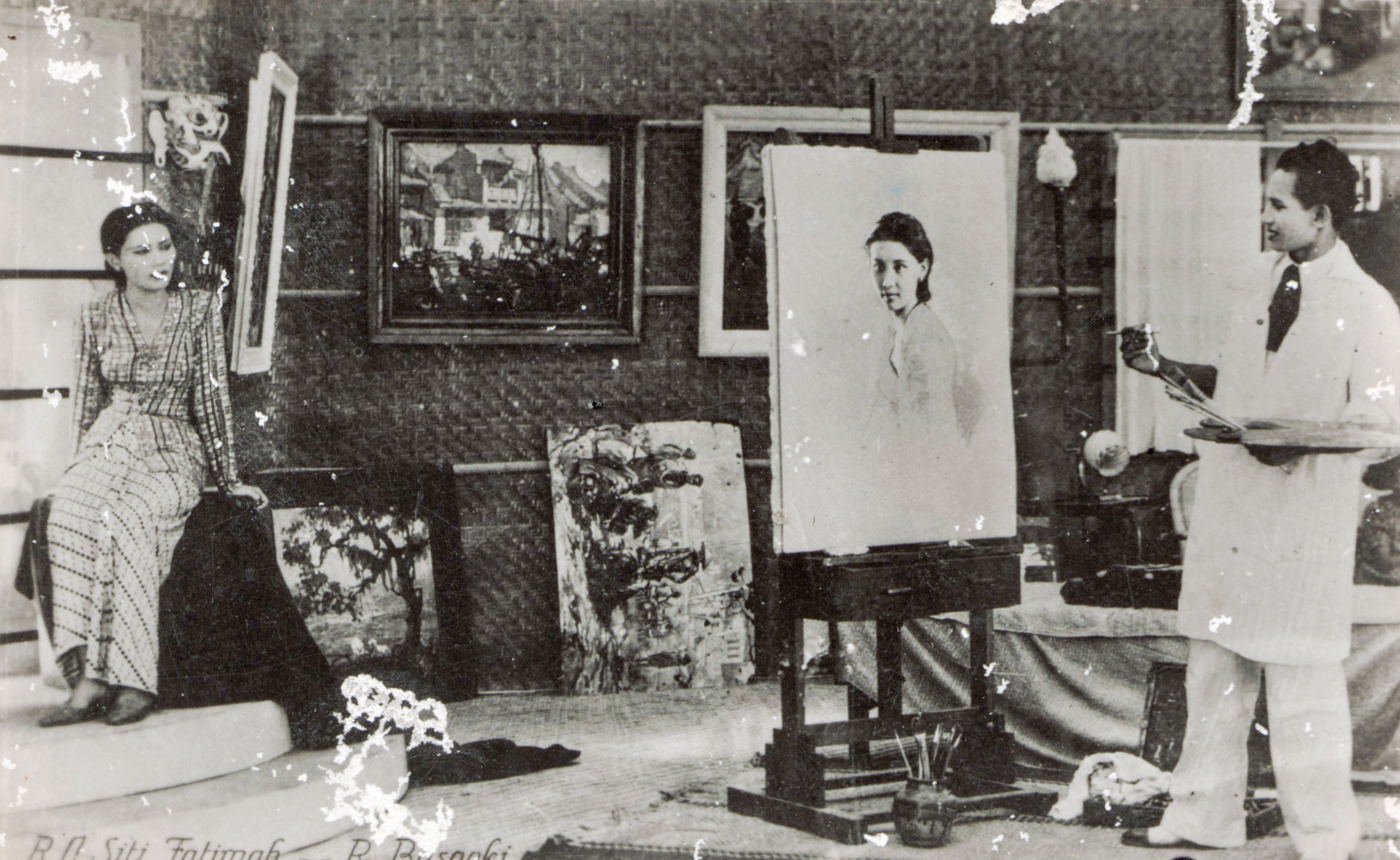
Basoeki Resobowo (right) painting Fatimah in a scene from Kedok Ketawa

Kedok Ketawa was the first film produced by Union Films, one of four new production houses established after the success of Albert Balink's Terang Boelan revived the ailing motion picture industry of the Dutch East Indies. Union was headquartered in Prinsenlaan, Batavia (now Mangga Besar, Jakarta) and funded by the ethnic Chinese businessman Ang Hock Liem, although Tjoa Ma Tjoen was in charge of day-to-day operations. The film was shot on location in Cibodas, and featured fighting, comedy, and singing.

The movie was directed by Jo An Djan and starred Oedjang, Fatimah, and Basoeki Resobowo. Other members of the cast included S Poniman and Eddy Kock. Oedjang had been a stage actor before appearing in the film, while Fatimah and Basoeki were nobles with a formal education. (Note: Biran (2009, p. 244) writes that Fatimah was "educated" (terpelajar) without specifying the extent of her studies. Basoeki had previously worked as a teacher.) The Indonesian film historian Misbach Yusa Biran writes that this is evidence the picture was targeted at intellectual audiences, a manifestation of Union's stated goal of "improv[ing] the quality of Indonesian art". (Note: Original: "... buat mengangkat derajatnya kesenian Indonesia.")

Following the success of Terang Boelan (1937; based on The Jungle Princess), the domestic movie-making industry began to model their productions after Hollywood works, as this was expected to ensure financial success. The Indonesian film scholars Ekky Imanjaya and Said Salim write that Kedok Ketawa was influenced by Bram Stoker's 1897 novel Dracula through its Hollywood adaptations. Neither writer gives comparisons to illustrate this influence.

Kedok Ketawa was not the first contemporary film featuring a masked hero. Tan's Film had released Gagak Item (The Black Crow), with Rd Mochtar as the masked Black Crow, in 1939, and later productions, including Java Industrial Film's Srigala Item (The Black Wolf; 1941), continued the trend. As was common for contemporary productions, the soundtrack for Kedok Ketawa – performed by Poniman – consisted of kroncong songs.

== Release and reception ==
Kedok Ketawa was released in Batavia in July 1940, with a press screening on 20 July. By September it was being shown in Surabaya. In some newspaper advertisements, such as in Pemandangan, it was referred to as Pendekar dari Preanger (Warrior from Preanger), while in others it was advertised with the Dutch title Het Lachende Masker. (Note: This title also meant "The Laughing Mask".) It was marketed as an "Indonesian cocktail of violent actions ... and sweet romance" (Note: Original: "... een indonesische cocktail van heftige acties ... zoete romantiek".) and rated for all ages.

The critic and screenwriter Saeroen, writing for Pemandangan, praised Kedok Ketawa, especially its cinematography and the beauty of its scenery; he compared the film to imported Hollywood films. An anonymous review in Bataviaasch Nieuwsblad found that the film was a mix of native and European sensibilities and lauded its cinematography. According to the review, the film surpassed expectations, but it was evident that this was a first production. Another review, in Soerabaijasch Handelsblad, considered the film among the best local productions, emphasising the quality of its cinematography and acting.

== Legacy ==
Soon after the success of Kedok Ketawa, Saeroen joined Union Films and wrote four films for the company. These were not directed by Jo An Djan, who left Union for the competitor Populair's Film, but by the newly hired R Hu and Rd Ariffien. Union Film ultimately produced a total of seven films in 1940 and 1941 before being closed following the Japanese invasion in early 1942. Of the film's main cast, only Fatimah and Oedjang are recorded as continuing their acting career, both appearing in several further Union productions. However, in the 1950s Resobowo continued his career behind the screen, serving as art director of such films as Darah dan Doa (The Long March; 1950).

Kedok Ketawa was screened as late as August 1944, but may be a lost film. Films were then shot on flammable nitrate film, and after a fire destroyed much of Produksi Film Negara's warehouse in 1952, old films shot on nitrate were deliberately destroyed. While the American visual anthropologist Karl G. Heider suggests that all Indonesian films from before 1950 are lost, J.B. Kristanto's Katalog Film Indonesia records several as having survived at Sinematek Indonesia's archives, and Biran writes that some Japanese propaganda films have survived at the Netherlands Government Information Service.

== Works cited ==
- "Basuki Resobowo". filmindonesia.or.id (in Indonesian). Jakarta: Konfiden Foundation. Archived from the original on 22 April 2014.
- Biran, Misbach Yusa (2009). Sejarah Film 1900–1950: Bikin Film di Jawa [History of Film 1900–1950: Making Films in Java] (in Indonesian). Komunitas Bamboo working with the Jakarta Art Council. ISBN 978-979-3731-58-2.
- Biran, Misbach Yusa (2012). "Film di Masa Kolonial" [Film in the Colonial Period]. Indonesia dalam Arus Sejarah: Masa Pergerakan Kebangsaan [Indonesia in the Flow of Time: The Nationalist Movement] (in Indonesian). Vol. V. Ministry of Education and Culture. pp. 268–93. ISBN 978-979-9226-97-6.
- "Eddy Kock". filmindonesia.or.id (in Indonesian). Jakarta: Konfiden Foundation. Archived from the original on 26 July 2014.
- "Filmaankondiging Cinema Palace: Kedok Ketawa" [Film at Cinema Palace: Kedok Ketawa]. Bataviaasch Nieuwsblad (in Dutch). Batavia. 20 July 1940. p. 3.
- Heider, Karl G (1991). Indonesian Cinema: National Culture on Screen. Honolulu: University of Hawaii Press. ISBN 978-0-8248-1367-3.
- Imanjaya, Ekky (2006). A to Z about Indonesian Film (in Indonesian). Bandung: Mizan. ISBN 978-979-752-367-1.
- "Kedok Ketawa". Soerabaijasch Handelsblad (in Dutch). Surabaya. 12 September 1940. p. 10.
- "Kedok Ketawa". filmindonesia.or.id (in Indonesian). Jakarta: Konfiden Foundation. Archived from the original on 2 December 2013.
- "Oedjang". filmindonesia.or.id (in Indonesian). Jakarta: Konfiden Foundation. Archived from the original on 21 May 2014.
- "RS Fatimah". filmindonesia.or.id (in Indonesian). Jakarta: Konfiden Foundation. Archived from the original on 26 July 2014.
- Saeroen (19 July 1940). "Film 'Kedok Ketawa'" [The Film 'Kedok Ketawa']. Pemandangan (in Indonesian). Jakarta. p. n.p. (clipping accessed at Sinematek Indonesia)
- Said, Salim (July 1992). "The Rise of the Indonesian Film Industry". East-West Film Journal. 6 (2): 99–115. ISSN 0891-6780.
- "(Untitled)". Pemandangan (in Indonesian). Jakarta. 7 August 1940. p. n.p. (clipping accessed at Sinematek Indonesia)
- "(Untitled)". Soerabaijasch Handelsblad (in Dutch). Surabaya. 13 September 1940. p. 7.
- "(Untitled)". Tjahaja (in Indonesian). Bandung. 8 August 1944. p. 2. Archived from the original on 28 July 2014.
