= Basuki Resobowo =

Indonesian painter (1916–1999)

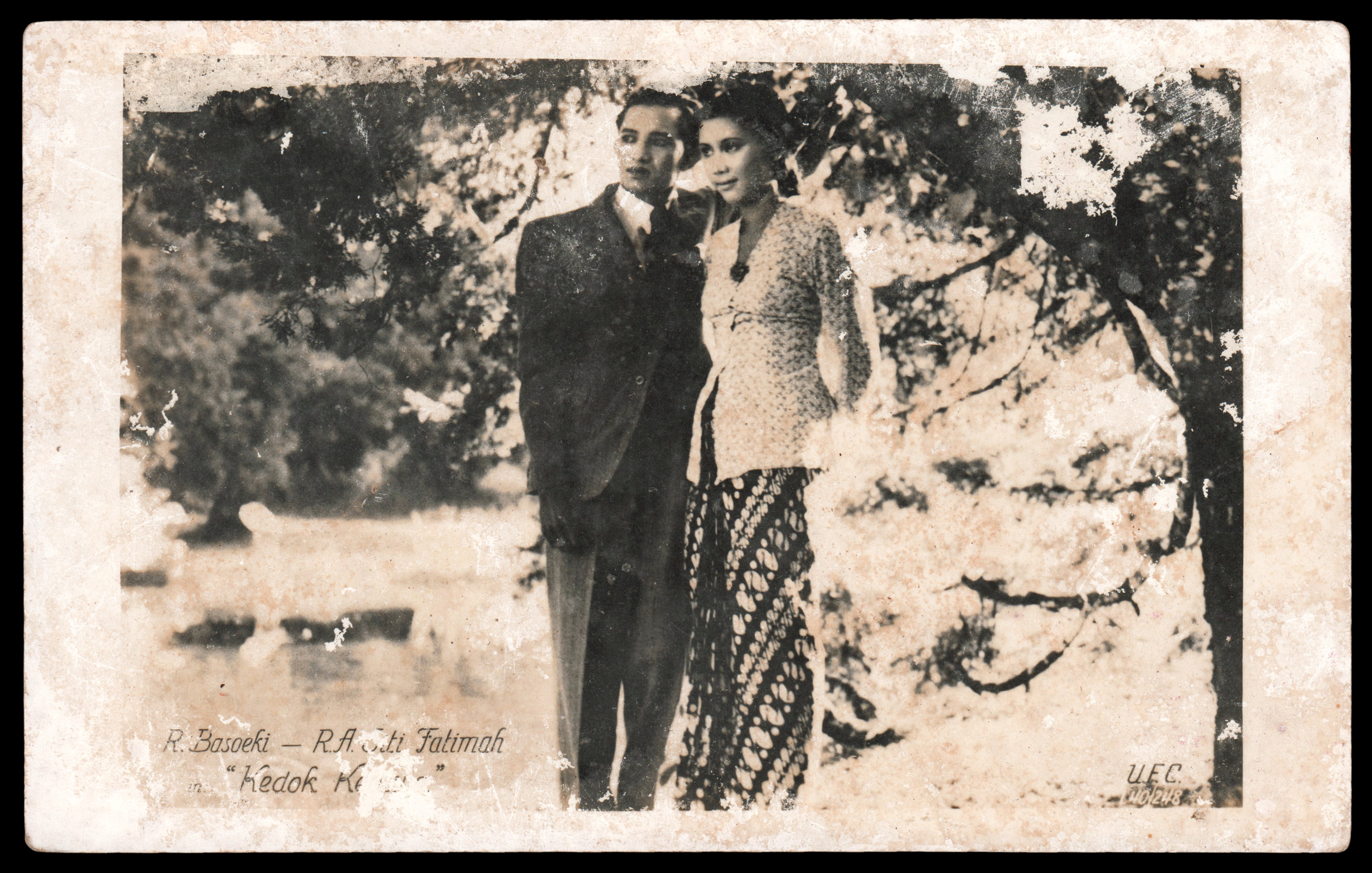
- Resobowo (left) with his Kedok Ketawa co-star Fatimah, 1941
- Born: 18 February 1916; Dutch East Indies
- Died: 5 January 1999 (aged 82); Amsterdam, Netherlands
- Occupations: Painter, production designer, writer
- Years active: 1940s–1990s
- Children: 2

Basoeki Resobowo (Perfected Spelling: Basuki Resobowo; 18 February 1916 – 5 January 1999) was an Indonesian painter. Born to a transmigrant father in Sumatra, from a young age he showed interest in the visual arts but was taught to be a teacher. After a short time at a Taman Siswa school in Batavia (now Jakarta), he studied design and worked as a surveyor while producing sketches and book covers. He only acted in a single film, Kedok Ketawa, but remained close to the acting community, first as a set designer during the Japanese occupation of the Dutch East Indies then for Perfini in the early 1950s.

During the 1940s and 50s Resobowo became recognised as a painter, working with such artists as Trisno Sumardjo and Oesman Effandi. By the late 1950s he was head of the visual arts department of the Institute for the People's Culture. However, the political climate of Indonesia soon made Resobowo's leftist leanings dangerous, and he went into exile beginning in the 1960s, ultimately settling in Amsterdam, the Netherlands. There he wrote extensively on art until his death.

== Early life ==
Resobowo was born on 18 February 1916 as the second child to Prawiroatmojo and his wife. Sources disagree as to where he was born. The Jakarta City Government's Encyclopedia of Jakarta states his place of birth as Palembang, West Sumatra, but Taman Ismail Marzuki's biography of the artist gives a birthplace of Bengkulu, with Palembang and Lampung as locations in which he lived as a child with his transmigrant family. As a child, he enjoyed drawing.

In order to become a teacher, Resobowo was sent to live with his uncle in the capital of the Dutch East Indies, Batavia (now Jakarta). There he attended a Dutch-run school for indigenes, the Europesche Largere School. After graduating, in 1930 Resobowo was sent to live with another uncle and started his studies at a Dutch-run middle school, or MULO. However, in his second year he moved to Yogyakarta, where he completed his education in a Taman Siswa-run school and was primed to be a teacher. One of his classmates in Yogyakarta was Sindoedarsono Soedjojono, and the two often painted together.

Resobowo returned to Batavia in 1933 and, for a short while, served as a teacher at a Taman Siswa school there. This return was only temporary, however, as between 1936 and 1938 he lived in Bandung, West Java, and studied design at a school established by the architect Ir. Roosseno. While in that city, Resobowo was active with the social organization Indonesia Muda, becoming the head of the Bandung Chapter and attending the group's 1937 conference in Surabaya.

== Developing career ==
In 1938, Resobowo again returned to Batavia, finding a house in the Tangkiwood area of the city, in which many of the domestic film industry's stars lived. There he met such actors as Roekiah and her husband Kartolo; Resobowo, together with S. Toetoer, drew a portrait of her. Over the next several years Resobowo served as a surveyor in areas such as Sawangan and Pamengpeuk. In the meantime, he remained active in the visual arts, becoming a member of the Indonesian Painters Association (Persatuan Ahli Gambar Indonesia or PERSAGI) and designing book covers, including to Armijn Pane's translation of Door Duisternis tot Licht (Out of the Darkness Comes the Light), a collection of Kartini's letters.

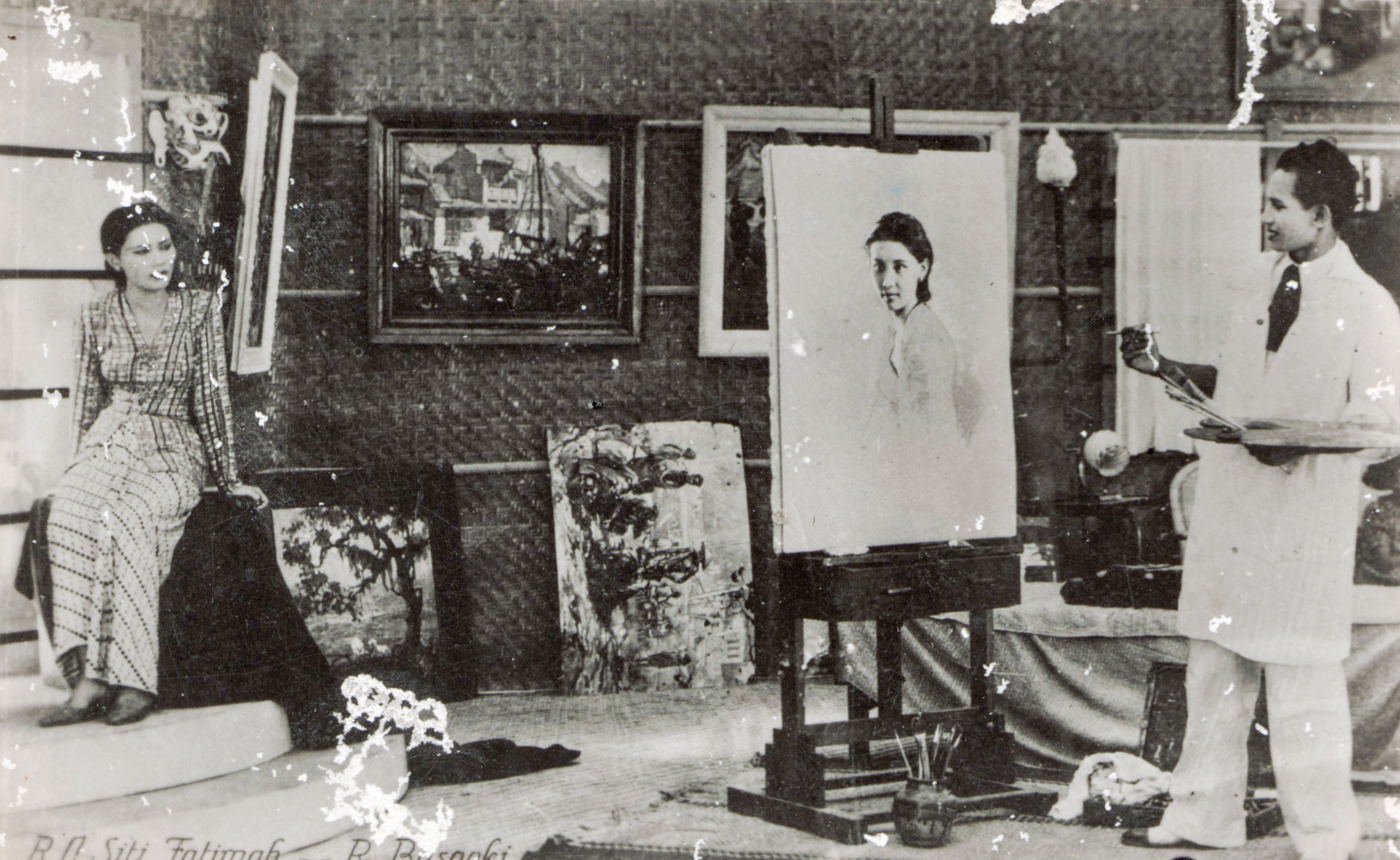
Resobowo (right) in a scene from Kedok Ketawa

Union Films, a company established by ethnic Chinese businessmen, signed Resobowo to act in their first film, Kedok Ketawa, in 1941. Resobowo was cast as the painter Basuki, who must work with the "Laughing Mask" in order to save his lover Minarsih from a lecherous rich man. The studio emphasised Resobowo's education in order to draw audiences. Although this film was a critical success, Union's subsequent releases — beginning with Harta Berdarah (1941) — did not include Resobowo.

During the Japanese occupation of the Dutch East Indies, which lasted from 1942 and 1945, Resobowo spent time working for the visual arts division of the Cultural Centre (in Indonesian, Poesat Keboedajaan; in Japanese, Keimin Bunka Shidōsho (啓民文化指導所)), where he was tasked with writing radio broadcasts regarding the visual arts. However, he left this position in order to handle stage decor for various acting troupes, including Bintang Surabaya, Fifi Young's Pagoda, and Tjahaja Timur. While doing the decor for these troupes he would often travel with them, and in his spare time he would sketch their stars. He won best painting at a Cultural Centre competition in 1943, and as such he was compared to Basuki Abdullah and Affandi.

== Indonesian independence ==
Indonesia proclaimed its independence on 17 August 1945, and Resobowo worked to spread this news. Together with M. Balfas, he designed posters related to Indonesian independence which he spread through the kampung of Jakarta (renamed during the occupation). He was also a member of the Menteng 31 group. However, when the returning Dutch colonial forces forced the republican government out of Jakarta in 1946, Resobowo left the city. He spent the remainder of the Indonesian National Revolution (1945–1949) in cities such as Yogyakarta, Madiun (where he sketched Lake Sarangan), and Sukabumi. When he was living in Madiun he worked with Sudjojono, Sudibio, and Trisno Sumardjo to establish the Young Artists of Indonesia (Seniman Indonesia Muda, or SIM); he remained active with this group even after moving to Surakarta and Yogyakarta.

After the end of the revolution, Resobowo worked regularly with Trisno Sumardjo, Oesman Effandi, and Zaini. The painters held exhibitions in several cities, including Yogyakarta in 1952, Padang, Medan, and Bali. The four, as well as several other artists, were also commissioned to sketch historical figures for schoolbooks by the Familij Sarekat Compagnij.

Meanwhile, Resobowo joined Usmar Ismail's film company Perfini. Beginning with Darah dan Doa (1950), Resobowo became production designer; he also assisted Sitor Situmorang in polishing the script. With the company's next production, Embun (1951), Resobowo again worked on the script, the majority of which was penned by director D. Djajakusuma. For three further films, Enam Djam di Djogdja (1951), Dosa Tak Berampun (1951), and Terimalah Laguku (1952), he again served as artistic director. For his last film with the company, Tamu Agung (1955), Resobowo adapted Nikolai Gogol's The Government Inspector into an Indonesian context: the film focuses on the anticipation of the visit of a dignitary to a small isolated village in East Java.

In 1955 Resobowo ran in the legislative election, running for the Communist Party of Indonesia (Partai Komunis Indonesia, or PKI). Towards the end of the 1950s, Resobowo was selected to head the visual arts department of the Institute for the People's Culture (Lembaga Kebudajaan Rakjat, or Lekra), a leftists organisation active in the arts and literature. He also contributed articles on the visual arts to such magazines as Budaya, Harian Rakyat, Indonesia, Seniman, Zaman Baru, and Zenith.

== Life in exile and death ==
Amidst a background of an increasingly unstable political situation in Indonesia, including conflicts between leftists (such as the PKI and Lekra) and rightists such as the military, in 1962 Resobowo left the country for China. The failed G30S coup of 1965, which was blamed on the Communists and followed by an anti-communist purge, left the artist unable to return to Indonesia. He lived in China until 1962, before moving to Germany and ultimately Amsterdam, the Netherlands.

During his over thirty years of exile, Resobowo wrote extensively. He published a graphic novel in two volumes, titled Cut Nyak Din, about the Acehnese warrior. He also wrote an autobiography, Riwayat Hidupku, as well as books such as Bercermin Di Muka Kaca and Karmiatun. He never abandoned his leftist leanings, writing in his 1994 book Seniman, Seni, dan Masyarakat (Art, Artists, and Society; the title taken from a 1947 essay by Sudjojono) that politics and art were inseparable, and that artists could only truly serve their society through Marxism. He likewise remained politically active, participating in a hunger strike in 1992 against the threatened executions of Ruslan Wijayasastra and other former PKI members.

Resobowo was only able to return to Indonesia in 1998, when he visited the country and met many of its artists. He returned to the Netherlands and died in Amsterdam on 5 January 1999, leaving two children and an ex-wife.

== Legacy ==
The poet Chairil Anwar dedicated two poems to Resobowo. The first, "Sorga" ("Heaven"), was written in Malang on 25 February 1947 and included in Anwar's collection Deru Tjampur Debu. The second, "Sajak Buat Basuki Resobowo" ("A Poem for Basuki Resobowo"), was penned three days later and included in the anthology Tiga Menguak Takdir. When HB Jassin compiled Chairil Anwar Pelopor Angkatan '45, these two poems were combined as "Dua Sajak Buat Basuki Resobowo". English translations of these poems were published by Burton Raffel in 1970.

Monash University describes Tamu Agung as "brilliantly interweav[ing] modern political discourse (including a militant feminism that appears to have emerged with the Indonesian revolution) with archaic Javanese rhetoric, taken from the narratives of the Wayang (traditional Javanese shadow play)".

Resobowo's portrait of Soetomo is held in the Presidential Palace in Jakarta. The portrait was completed on government commission.

== Works cited ==
- Anwar, Chairil (2012). Pamusuk Eneste (ed.). Aku Ini Binatang Jalang [I'm a Wild Beast] (in Indonesian). Jakarta: Gramedia.
- "Basuki Resobowo". Encyclopedia of Jakarta (in Indonesian). Jakarta City Government. Archived from the original on 2014-09-06.
- "Basuki Resobowo". filmindonesia.or.id (in Indonesian). Jakarta: Konfiden Foundation. Archived from the original on 22 April 2014.
- "Basuki Resobowo" (in Indonesian). Taman Ismail Marzuki. Archived from the original on 4 April 2015.
- Biran, Misbach Yusa (2009). Sejarah Film 1900–1950: Bikin Film di Jawa [History of Film 1900–1950: Making Films in Java] (in Indonesian). Komunitas Bamboo working with the Jakarta Art Council. ISBN 978-979-3731-58-2.
- Cribb, Robert; Kahin, Audrey (2004). Historical Dictionary of Indonesia. Historical dictionaries of Asia, Oceania, and the Middle East. Lanham, Maryland: Scarecrow Press. ISBN 978-0-8108-4935-8.
- Hoerip, Satyagraha (1995). Dua Dunia dalam Djadoeg Djajakoesoema [Two Worlds in Djadoeg Djajakoesoema] (in Indonesian). Jakarta: Jakartan Ministry of Culture working with the Jakarta Institute of Art. ISBN 978-979-8699-00-9.
- "Kedok Ketawa". Soerabaijasch Handelsblad (in Dutch). Surabaya. 12 September 1940. p. 10.
- Raffel, Burton (1970). Complete Prose and Poetry of Chairil Anwar. Albany: State University of New York Press. ISBN 978-0-87395-061-9.
- "Tamu Agung". Filmindonesia.or.id (in Indonesian). Konfiden Foundation. Archived from the original on 1 July 2014.
- "Tamu Agung – Exalted Guest". Monash University Faculty of the Arts. Archived from the original on 25 October 2015.
