= Wanita dan Satria =

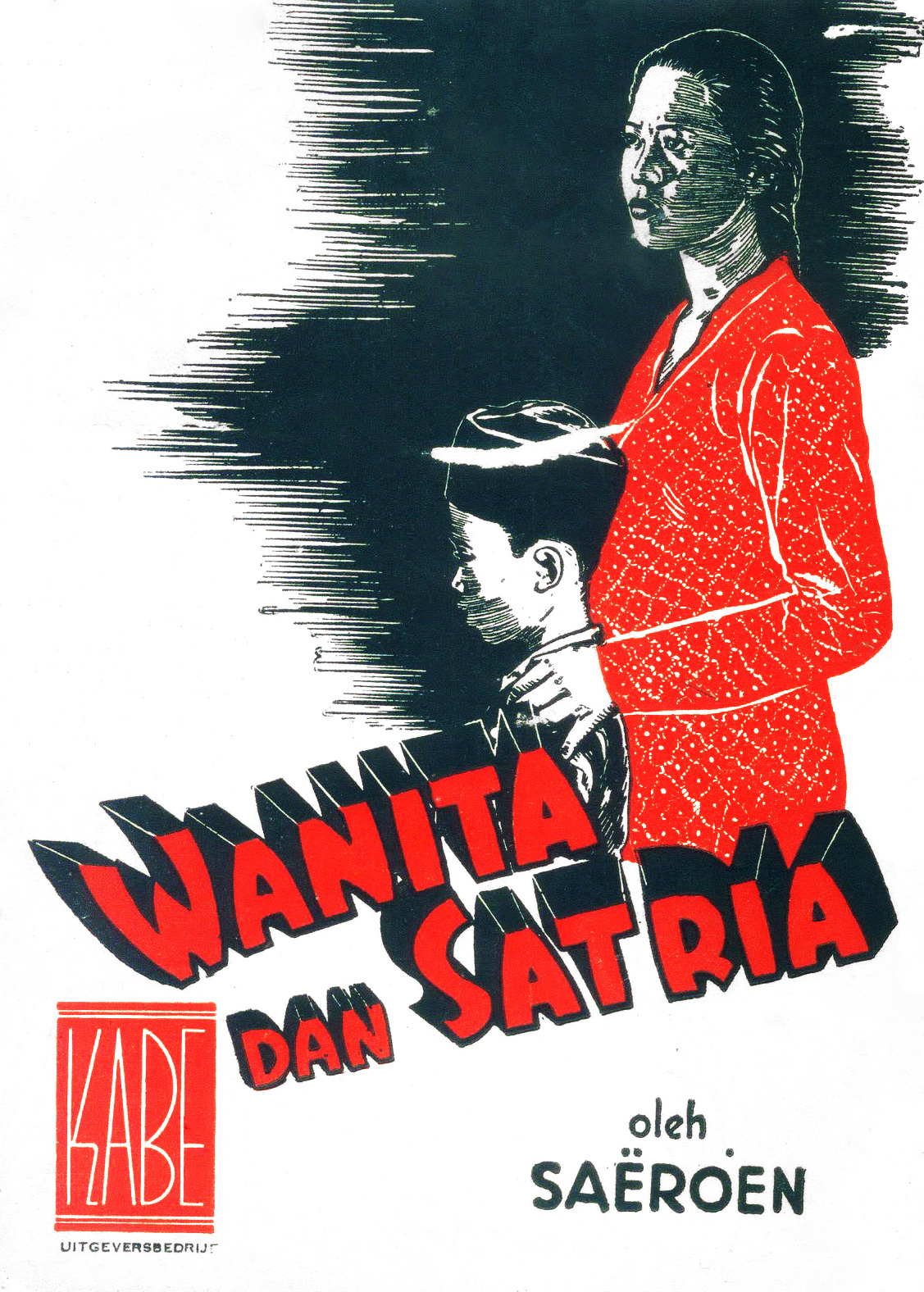
- Cover of the novelisation
- Directed by: Rd Ariffien
- Produced by: Ang Hock Liem
- Starring: Djoewariah; Ratna Djoewita; Hidajat
- Production company: Union Films
- Release date: 1941 (Dutch East Indies)
- Country: Dutch East Indies
- Language: Indonesian

Wanita dan Satria (Indonesian pronunciation: [waˌnit̪a dan saˈt̪ria]; Indonesian for The Woman and the Hero) is a 1941 film from the Dutch East Indies (now Indonesia) directed by Rd Ariffien and produced by Ang Hock Liem for Union Films that is probably lost. Starring Djoewariah, Ratna Djoewita, Hidajat, Z. Algadrie, and Moesa, it follows a womaniser named Soedrajat who abuses his status to gain women's trust before ultimately getting his comeuppance. Reviews were mostly positive, with one praising the film's depiction of women's issues in a Muslim society.

== Plot ==
Soedrajat abuses his high social status in order to womanise and becomes his rich uncle's heir despite the latter having a son, the kindly and noble Soelarsa. The uncle is disappointed with Soelarsa and considers Soedrajat the better man. Being considered high class, he is unwilling to associate with people of the lower classes. Ultimately Soedrajat falls for a beautiful young woman, Koestijah. Meanwhile, Soelarsa saves Koestijah's life while driving a truck through her village; the two fall in love at first sight. By manipulating Koestijah's father, Soedrajat arranges for her to marry him.

At the wedding, however, the terrible truth about Soedrajat is revealed. One of his former conquests, Tarmini, stands up and tells the crowd, including Soelarsa, of the bridegroom's true nature. In a rage, Soedrajat takes a revolver and shoots Tarmini. With her dying breath, Tarmini makes one last confession. Her father then takes revenge on Soedrajat. (Note: Film plot derived from two contemporary newspaper reviews. See Soerabaijasch Handelsblad 1941, Sampoerna a and Soerabaijasch Handelsblad 1941, Sampoerna b.)

== Production ==
Wanita dan Satria was produced by Ang Hock Liem for Union Films. It was directed by Rd Ariffien, a former theatre leader and nationalist journalist who had made his directorial debut the preceding year with Harta Berdarah. The story was written by Saeroen, a former journalist with several screenwriting credits for Union.

The black-and-white film starred Djoewariah, Ratna Djoewita, Hidajat, Z. Algadrie, and Moesa. Moesa was the most experienced of these: he had entered the industry in 1938 with Fatima, a production by Tan's Film, and had been with Union since 1940. Djoewariah had been on Union's payroll since Bajar dengan Djiwa in 1940, while Ratna Djoewita and Hidajat had not appeared in any films before 1941.

== Release and reception ==
Wanita dan Satria was released in 1941, reaching Bandung by August and Surabaya by September. The film was open to all ages. A novelisation was published later in 1941 by the Yogyakarta-based Kolff-Buning. As part of the growing movement to attract Indonesian intellectuals, the marketing staff emphasised the respectable (non-theatrical) background of the actors; the intelligentsia had little respect for traditional theatre and its players.

A review in the Surabaya-based Soerabaijasch Handelsblad wrote that the film "gives a clear picture of the precarious position of Indonesian women and motivates the desire for a firmer outline of her rights in the Moslem society." (Note: Original: "... geeft een duidelijk beeld van de wankele positie der Indonesische vrouw en motiveert den drang naar een vaster omlijning harer rechten In de Mohammedaansche maatschappij.") Another review in the same newspaper wrote that the film "is captivating from start to finish", (Note: Original: "... is van het begin tot het eind boeiend.") one which "the film audience in Surabaya should certainly not miss". (Note: Original: "... het Soerabaiasche filmpubliek beslist niet missen.")

== Legacy ==
After Wanita dan Satria, Union produced a further two films; none of these were by Rd. Ariffien, who had left the company. Saeroen likewise left soon after, joining Star Film. Djoewariah continued to act until the 1950s, when she migrated to theatre after receiving a series of increasingly minor roles. Neither Ratna Djoewita nor Hidajat appeared in any films after 1941.

The film is likely lost; the American visual anthropologist Karl G. Heider writes that all Indonesian films from before 1950 are lost. However, JB Kristanto's Katalog Film Indonesia (Indonesian Film Catalogue) records several as having survived at Sinematek Indonesia's archives, and Biran writes that several Japanese propaganda films have survived at the Netherlands Government Information Service.

== Works cited ==
- "Bandoeng: Bioscopen Hedenavond" [Bandung: In Cinemas Tonight]. Bataviaasch Nieuwsblad (in Dutch). Surabaya: Kolff & Co. 28 August 1941. p. 3.
- Biran, Misbach Yusa (2009). Sejarah Film 1900–1950: Bikin Film di Jawa [History of Film 1900–1950: Making Films in Java] (in Indonesian). Jakarta: Komunitas Bamboo working with the Jakarta Art Council. ISBN 978-979-3731-58-2.
- "Djuariah, Ng. R". filmindonesia.or.id (in Indonesian). Jakarta: Konfiden Foundation. Archived from the original on 16 January 2014.
- Heider, Karl G (1991). Indonesian Cinema: National Culture on Screen. Honolulu: University of Hawaii Press. ISBN 978-0-8248-1367-3.
- "Moesa". filmindonesia.or.id (in Indonesian). Jakarta: Konfiden Foundation. Archived from the original on 14 May 2014.
- "R Hidajat". filmindonesia.or.id (in Indonesian). Jakarta: Konfiden Foundation. Archived from the original on 20 October 2016.
- "Ratna Djoewita". filmindonesia.or.id (in Indonesian). Jakarta: Konfiden Foundation. Archived from the original on 21 May 2014.
- "Sampoerna 'Wanita dan Satria'". Soerabaijasch Handelsblad (in Dutch). Surabaya: Kolff & Co. 11 September 1941. p. 2.
- "Sampoerna: 'Wanita dan Satria'". Soerabaijasch Handelsblad (in Dutch). Surabaya: Kolff & Co. 11 September 1941. p. 6.
- "(untitled)". Soerabaijasch Handelsblad (in Dutch). Surabaya: Kolff & Co. 8 September 1941. p. 7.
- "Wanita dan Satria". filmindonesia.or.id (in Indonesian). Jakarta: Konfiden Foundation. Archived from the original on 15 January 2014.
- Wanita dan Satria (in Indonesian). OCLC 41906385 – via WorldCat.
