= Harta Berdarah =

1940 film by Rd Ariffien

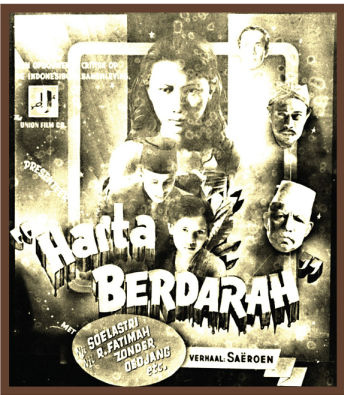
- Advertisement
- Directed by: R Hu; Rd Ariffien
- Screenplay by: Saeroen
- Starring: Zonder; Soelastri
- Cinematography: KH Tjit
- Production company: Union Films
- Release date: October 1940 (Dutch East Indies)
- Country: Dutch East Indies
- Language: Indonesian

Harta Berdarah ([harˈta bərˈdarah]; Indonesian for Bloody Treasure) is a 1940 action film from the Dutch East Indies (now Indonesia). Set in the Middle Ages, the film stars R Sukran and Hadidjah as a pirate and a princess who fall in love. Union Films, the country's first indigenous film production house, produced the film with Rd Ariffien and R Hu as directors. It was written by Saeroen, one of the country's most prolific screenwriters.The film, which stars Zonder and Soelastri, tells of a young man who convinces a stingy hadji to be more charitable and, in the process, falls in love with the man's daughter.

Released during Eid al-Fitr, Harta Berdarah was advertised as a "magnificent Indonesian action hit" and used Zonder's silat skills and Soelastri's fame as a keroncong singer to draw audiences. Reviews for the work were positive, with praise focused on its acting and story. Although Harta Berdarah was screened as late as 1944, as with most contemporary productions it is now likely lost.

== Plot ==
In the village of Soekasari, Mardjan (Oedjang) is forcefully evicting people who are unable to pay their taxes to his boss, the landlord Hadji Doerachman (Moesa). Doerachman, though aware of this, is unwilling to stop him, even after his daughter, Atikah (Soelastri), tries to convince him.

Mardjan and his men evict Asmadi, his wife Tjitjih (RS Fatimah), and Asmadi's sick mother. When Asmadi resists, Mardjan beats and detains him. Meanwhile, a young man named Rachmat (Zonder) is visiting his aunt in Soekasari. Learning of Mardjan's dealings, Rachmat finds him at Doerachman's home and insists that Mardjan stop. When Mardjan and his men try to fight, Rachmat overpowers them and negotiates Asmadi's release. Afterwards, Rachmat goes back to his aunt's home. Asmadi returns to his, only to learn that his mother had died shortly after the eviction; he swears revenge.

One day, Rachmat hears screaming and finds Atikah, who had fainted after seeing a snake. After she regains consciousness, Atikah thanks him for rescuing her. Although Rachmat is disgusted that he helped her after learning the identity of Atikah's father, as Rachmat and Atikah dedicate their time to social work, they begin to fall in love. Doerachman, however, disapproves of their relationship, and refuses to fund their work; as a result, Atikah takes her deceased mother's jewellery and some money to pay for village development. Later, when Rachmat and Atikah are sitting together and singing romantic songs, Mardjan overhears them. Back at Doerachman's home, Mardjan convinces his boss that Rachmat has ulterior motives, and that he is only interested in stealing Doerachman's wealth. He also asks for Doerachman's permission to marry Atikah, and persuades him to sign a letter with his seal. Unbeknownst to Doerachman, the letter is actually a confession of his crimes and orders Mardjan to seize his properties. Mardjan takes advantage of the illiterate Doerachman, manipulating him for his own gain.

In preparation for her marriage to Mardjan, Atikah is secluded at home. Learning of this betrothal, Rachmat goes to Doerachman and, after fighting Mardjan and his men, takes the hadji to the village where he and Atikah had initiated development programs. As they had all worked in Doerachman's name, the villagers do not fear him, but respect him. This, and the extent of the developments, makes Doerachman realise that hoarding his wealth for himself does not make him as happy as using it for charity. The two, accompanied by Asmadi, hurry back to Doerachman's home, only to find Mardjan and his men sitting relaxedly on the front porch.

After he is accosted by Doerachman, Mardjan reveals that the letter which Doerachman signed was actually a statement granting Mardjan all of the hadji's wealth. Furious at Mardjan's behaviour, Asmadi attacks him while Rachmat restrains the others. After a lengthy knife fight, Mardjan's foot is caught in the railroad tracks, and he is soon killed by a passing train. Doerachman, pleased with the return of his wealth, destroys the letter and grants Rachmat permission to marry Atikah. (Note: This plot summary is derived from the novelisation published by Kolff-Buning. The names of the actor in each role is derived from Panorama, Harta Berdarah.)

== Production ==
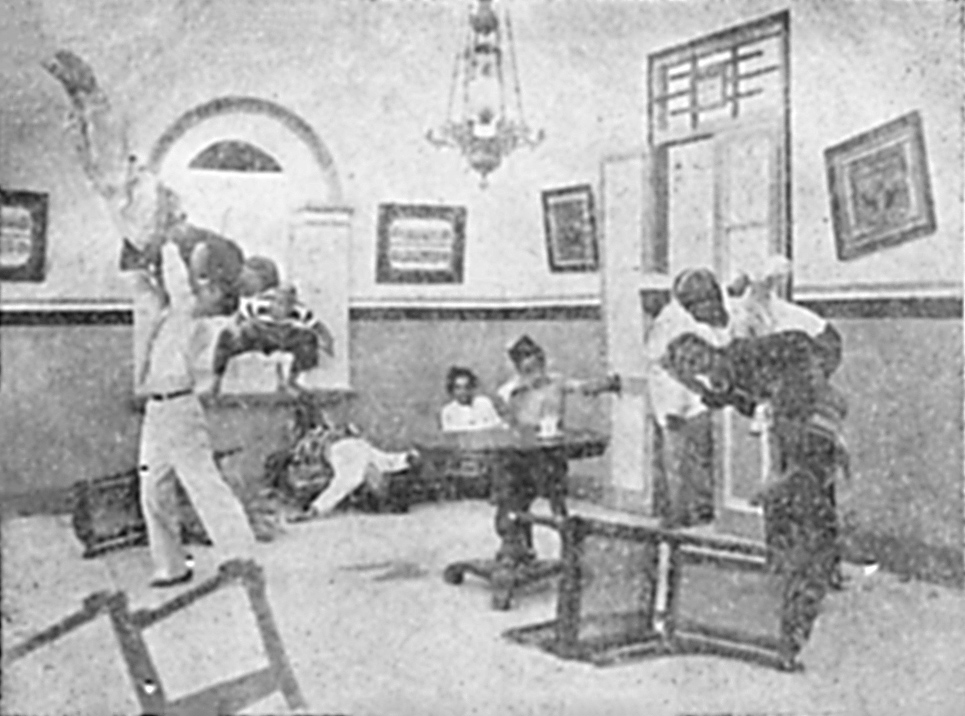
A scene showing Rachmat fighting Mardjan's men; the actor, Zonder, was skilled in martial arts.

Union Films was established in 1940 by ethnic Chinese businessmen, Ang Hock Liem and Tjoa Ma Tjoen. After the success of its first production, Kedok Ketawa (The Laughing Mask), the director Jo An Djan left for Populair's Film. Union hired new talent, including R Hu, Rd Ariffien, and Saeroen. All three were instrumental in the production of Harta Berdarah; Hu and Ariffien served as co-directors, both in their debuts, and Saeroen—who had written the commercial successes Terang Boelan (Full Moon; 1937) and Fatima (1938) for other companies—wrote the story. Ariffien credited their hirings to Union's interest in attracting educated Native audiences.

Harta Berdarah starred Soelastri and Zonder, and featured Moesa, Oedjang, Oesman, Haroen, and Abdullah. Many of these actors, including Soelastri and Fatimah, had had roles in Kedok Ketawa, and Moesa, though only recently signed, had previously acted for another company. Zonder, who made his film debut in Harta Berdarah, was well-versed in the traditional martial art of silat, while Soelastri was also known as a keroncong singer under the stage name Miss Ning; both made use of these skills for the film, which was scored by Hugo Dumas' musical troupe Lief Java. Cinematography for the production was handled by KH Tjit.

== Release and reception ==
Harta Berdarah was released in late October 1940, to coincide with the Eid al-Fitr holiday. The film, sometimes advertised under the Dutch title Bloedgeld, was billed as a "magnificent Indonesian action hit". (Note: Original: "... prachtige Indonesische film-schlager.") A novelisation, published by the Yogyakarta-based Kolff-Buning, was later released. It included several production stills.

Reception was positive. An anonymous review in De Indische Courant concluded that the film was simple yet well produced, with strong dialogue and humour. Another review, in the Soerabaijasch Handelsblad, was likewise positive; it found the film dissimilar to earlier domestic productions, in which "a group of stiff people moved woodenly and expelled inarticulate sounds", (Note: Original: "... een groepje stijf bij elkaar geposeerde personen met houtige bewegingen eenige ongearticuleerde klanken werden uitgestooten ...") becoming something which could be enjoyed by anyone, "Indonesian or European alike". (Note: Original: "... waarvan men kan genteten, Indonesier of European.")

== Legacy ==
After Harta Berdarah, Union produced five more films; all but one were directed by Hu or Ariffien. Saeroen wrote three of the five Union films. After completing the script for the last of these, Saeroen left Union for Star Film, where he worked on films such as Wanita dan Satria (1941). Most of the cast remained with Union for several productions; the company's subsequent production, Bajar dengan Djiwa (1941), for instance, again starred Zonder and Soelastri. Union Films was ultimately dissolved following the Japanese occupation of the Dutch East Indies in March 1942.

Harta Berdarah was screened as late as July 1944. The film is likely lost. All motion pictures at the time used highly flammable nitrate film, and after a fire destroyed much of Produksi Film Negara's warehouse in 1952, many films shot on nitrate were deliberately destroyed. As such, American visual anthropologist Karl G. Heider suggests that all Indonesian films from before 1950 are lost. However, JB Kristanto's Katalog Film Indonesia (Indonesian Film Catalogue) records several as having survived at Sinematek Indonesia's archives, and the film historian Misbach Yusa Biran writes that some Japanese propaganda films can be found at the Netherlands Government Information Service.

== Works cited ==
- "Bajar dengan Djiwa". filmindonesia.or.id (in Indonesian). Jakarta: Konfiden Foundation. Archived from the original on 2 December 2013.
- Biran, Misbach Yusa (2009). Sejarah Film 1900–1950: Bikin Film di Jawa [History of Film 1900–1950: Making Films in Java] (in Indonesian). Jakarta: Komunitas Bamboo working with the Jakarta Art Council. ISBN 978-979-3731-58-2.
- Biran, Misbach Yusa (2012). "Film di Masa Kolonial" [Film in the Colonial Period]. Indonesia dalam Arus Sejarah: Masa Pergerakan Kebangsaan [Indonesia in the Flow of Time: The Nationalist Movement] (in Indonesian). Vol. V. Ministry of Education and Culture. pp. 268–93. ISBN 978-979-9226-97-6.
- "City: Harta Berdarah". Soerabaijasch Handelsblad (in Dutch). Surabaya. 1 November 1940. p. 8.
- "Filmnieuws: City: 'Bloedgeld'" [Film News: City: 'Harta Berdarah']. De Indische Courant (in Dutch). Batavia. 1 November 1940. p. 2.
- "Harta Berdarah". Panorama (in Indonesian). Vol. 14, no. 43. Jakarta. 2 November 1940. p. n.p. (clipping accessed at Sinematek Indonesia)
- "Harta Berdarah". filmindonesia.or.id (in Indonesian). Jakarta: Konfiden Foundation. Archived from the original on 2 December 2013.
- Heider, Karl G (1991). Indonesian Cinema: National Culture on Screen. Honolulu: University of Hawaii Press. ISBN 978-0-8248-1367-3.
- "Kedok Ketawa". filmindonesia.or.id (in Indonesian). Jakarta: Konfiden Foundation. Archived from the original on 2 December 2013.
- "Kredit Lengkap Harta Berdarah" [Full Credits for Harta Berdarah]. filmindonesia.or.id (in Indonesian). Jakarta: Konfiden Foundation. Archived from the original on 14 May 2014.
- "Moesa". filmindonesia.or.id (in Indonesian). Jakarta: Konfiden Foundation. Archived from the original on 14 May 2014.
- "Saeroen". filmindonesia.or.id (in Indonesian). Jakarta: Konfiden Foundation. Archived from the original on 10 November 2013.
- Saeroen (1940). Harta Berdarah [Bloody Treasure] (in Indonesian). Yogyakarta: Kolff-Buning. OCLC 621593610. (book acquired from the collection of Museum Tamansiswa Dewantara Kirti Griya, Yogyakarta)
- "(untitled)". Soerabaijasch Handelsblad (in Dutch). Surabaya. 29 October 1940. p. 7.
- "(untitled)". Tjahaja (in Indonesian). Bandung. 14 July 1944. p. 2. Archived from the original on 15 May 2014.
