= Eef Brouwers =

Dutch journalist

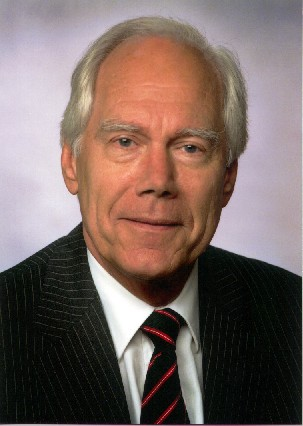
Brouwers

Evert (Eef) Brouwers (9 March 1939 – 6 October 2018) was a Dutch journalist, director-general and spokesman.

== Life and career ==
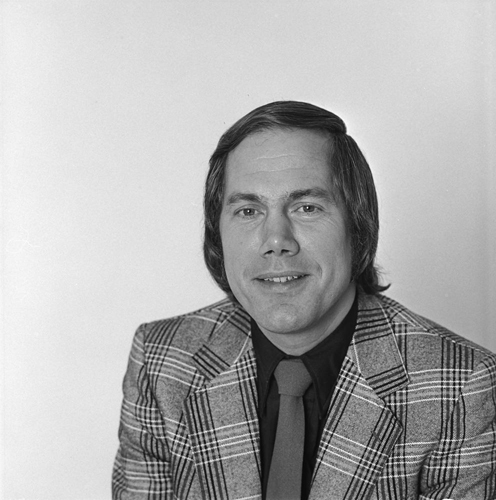

Brouwers was born in Zwolle in 1939 as an only child. He grew up in the city of Groningen and attended high school there. He studied at the School of Journalism in Zwolle.

Brouwers started his career as journalist at the Nieuwe Provinciale Groninger Courant and then as news presenter at Regionale Omroep Noord en Oost, AVRO, NOS Studio Sport, NOS and NOS Journaal. Until 1983, he worked in journalism at the Utrechts Nieuwsblad, the Nieuwsblad van het Noorden, where he was editor-in-chief, the Regionale Omroep Noord en Oost and the AVRO. From 1973 to 1977, he was a presenter of NOS Studio Sport and newsreader of the NOS Journal.

In 1983, Brouwers was appointed director of the Philips Information Service, a position he held until 1995. From 1995 to 2004, he was director-general of the Dutch information service Rijksvoorlichtingsdienst. He was a chairman of the Information Council and also spokesman for both the Royal House and the Prime Minister. During this period he had to deal with the fuss around Jorge Zorreguieta, Princess Mabel and Princess Margarita, among others. Brouwers was succeeded by Gerard van der Wulp.

During the 2004, European Football Championship, Brouwers was a communication advisor to the Netherlands national football team. He then held positions on boards of civil society organizations and on advisory boards of companies.

Brouwers received various honours: he was an officer in the Order of Orange-Nassau (Netherlands), commander in the Order of Leopold II (Belgium) and an honorary citizen of Thorn (Netherlands). He was also awarded the Cross of Honor in the House Order of Orange.

== References and sources ==
- Communication, Eef Brouwers
- De Volkskrant, personal about Eef Brouwers
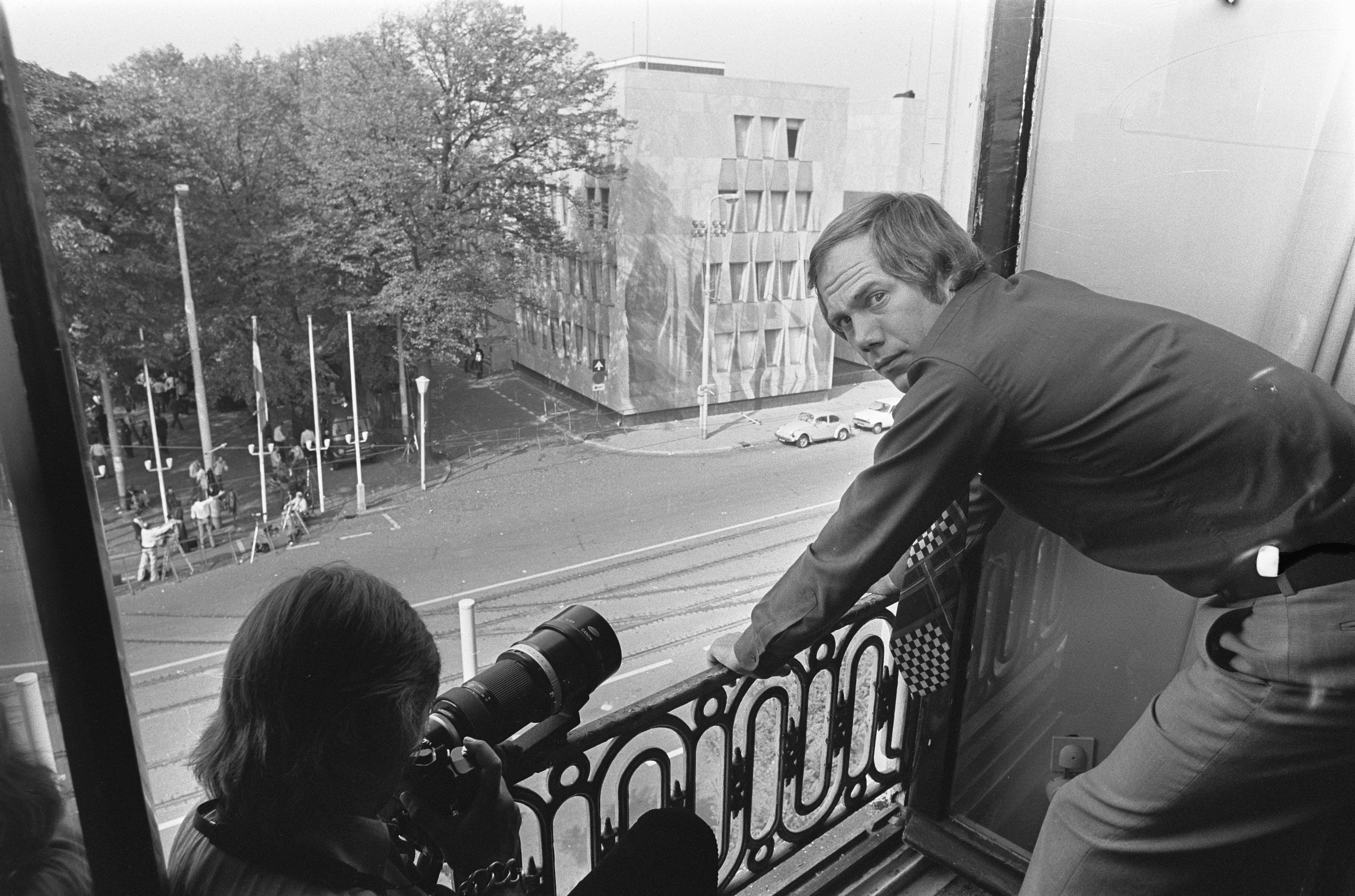
- Assignment Free People, Eef Brouwers looking out the window NOS-center
  Interview with Eef Brouwers
