= Djoewariah =

Indonesian actress and singer

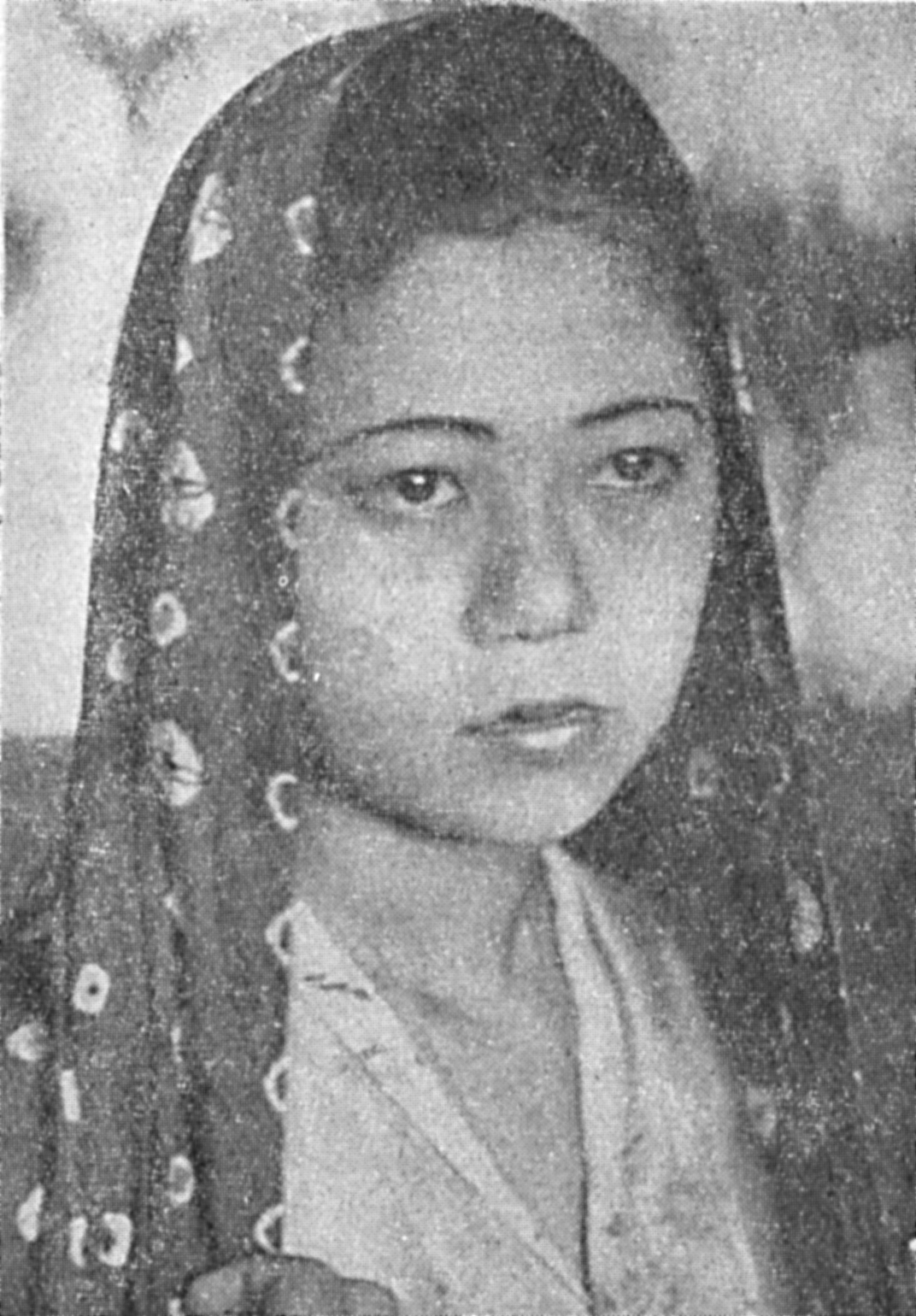
- Born: Ng. Ratu; Lampung, Dutch East Indies
- Other names: Djoeariah; Juwariah
- Occupation: Actress
- Years active: 1940–1954

Ng. Ratu Djoewariah (also known as Djoeariah; Enhanced Spelling: Juwariah) was an Indonesian actress active in the 1940s and 1950s.

== Biography ==
Djoewariah originated from Lampung. She entered cinema in 1940, when she was signed by Union Films in Batavia, Dutch East Indies (now Jakarta, Indonesia), for Bajar dengan Djiwa. In her film debut, she played the role of Djuliah, a young woman who is sold to a loan shark by her father. This was followed by another two films, both produced in 1941. In Wanita dan Satria she appeared alongside Ratna Djoewita and Hidajat in the story of a playboy who ultimately receives his comeuppance, whereas in Asmara Moerni, Djoewariah as a maid who becomes the target of the affections of a young doctor (played by Adnan Kapau Gani).

Union Films was closed in 1942 following the Japanese occupation of the Dutch East Indies, and film production throughout the 1940s was much slower than it had been under the Dutch. During this time Djoewariah acted on stage, touring with Fred Young's Bintang Soerabaja troupe; she is recorded as acting for them in a 1944 performance of the stage play Sehidup Semati. The occupation ended in 1945, and President Sukarno proclaimed an independent Indonesian nation. During the ensuing national revolution, Djoewariah remained active as a stage actress and kroncong singer, winning a vocal competition in September 1947; by this time she was a member of the Fifi Young troupe, named for its star.

In 1949, as the revolution was winding down, Djoewariah returned to film with a role in the film version of Sehidup Semati. During the following five years she appeared in several roles of decreasing prominence. She made her last two films in 1954. In Karina (Gadis Pasaran), she portrayed a woman who had to become a radio singer in order to support her family after her husband is exiled to Papua. Meanwhile, in Kantjil Mas (Pedang dari Damascus), she portrayed a queen of Basan who attempts to wrest all power from her sister and co-queen before ultimately being defeated by a swordsman from Damascus. Ultimately, in 1954, Djoewariah left the cinema to return to the stage.

== Filmography ==
Djoewariah is recorded as appearing in some 12 films.

- Bajar dengan Djiwa (1940)
- Asmara Moerni (1941)
- Wanita dan Satria (1941)
- Sehidup Semati (1949)
- Bintang Surabaja 1951 (1950)
- Irawaty (Aju Kesuma) (1950)
- Musim Bunga di Selabintana (1951)
- Surjani Mulia (1951)
- Penjelundup (1952)
- Tunggal (1953)
- Kantjil Mas (Pedang dari Damascus) (1954)
- Karina (Gadis Pasaran) (1954)

== Works cited ==
- "Bajar dengan Djiwa". filmindonesia.or.id (in Indonesian). Jakarta: Konfiden Foundation. Archived from the original on 2 December 2013.
- Biran, Misbach Yusa, ed. (1979). Apa Siapa Orang Film Indonesia 1926–1978 [What and Who: Film Figures in Indonesia, 1926–1978]. Sinematek Indonesia. OCLC 6655859.
- Biran, Misbach Yusa (2009). Sejarah Film 1900-1950: Bikin Film di Jawa [History of Film 1900-1950: Making Films in Java] (in Indonesian). Komunitas Bamboo working with the Jakarta Art Council. ISBN 978-979-3731-58-2.
- "Doenia Sandiwara" [Stage World]. Tjahaja (in Indonesian). Bandung. 15 August 1944. p. 2. Archived from the original on 16 January 2014.
- "Filmaankondigingen Orion: 'Asmara Moerni'" [Orion Film Announcements: 'Asmara Moerni']. Bataviaasch Nieuwsblad (in Dutch). Batavia: Kolff & Co. 1 May 1941. p. 11.
- "Filmografi Djuariah" [Filmography for Djuariah]. filmindonesia.or.id (in Indonesian). Jakarta: Konfiden Foundation. Archived from the original on 15 January 2014.
- "Kantjil Mas (Pedang dari Damascus)". filmindonesia.or.id (in Indonesian). Jakarta: Konfiden Foundation. Archived from the original on 15 January 2014.
- "Karina (Gadis Pasaran)". filmindonesia.or.id (in Indonesian). Jakarta: Konfiden Foundation. Archived from the original on 15 January 2014.
- "Miss Djoeriah Menang!" [Miss Djoeriah Wins]. Pelita Rakjat (in Indonesian). Surabaya. 13 September 1947. p. 2. Archived from the original on 16 January 2014.
- Saeroen (1941). Asmara Moerni [True Romance] (in Indonesian). Yogyakarta: Kolff-Buning. OCLC 29049476. (book acquired from the collection of Museum Tamansiswa Dewantara Kirti Griya, Yogyakarta)
- "Wanita dan Satria". filmindonesia.or.id (in Indonesian). Jakarta: Konfiden Foundation. Archived from the original on 2 December 2013.
