= Rd Ariffien =

Indonesian film director

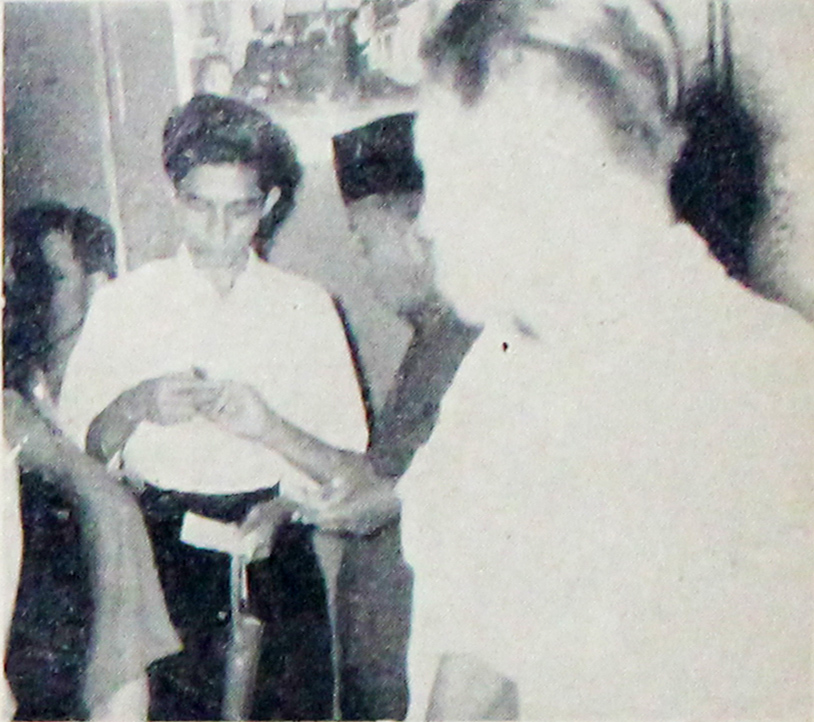
- Ariffien interviewed by the Dunia Film reporters on 15 May 1954
- Born: 23 June 1902; Cimahi, West Java, Dutch East Indies
- Died: 28 December 1976 (aged 74)
- Occupation: Film director

Raden Ariffien, often credited as Rd Ariffien, was an Indonesian film director. Initially a nationalist figure, he entered the film industry in 1940 after a period in theatre and radio. During his 25-year career, he was involved in some 36 films in various positions. He later became head editor of the film magazine Varia.

== Early career ==
Ariffien was born in Cimahi, Dutch East Indies, on 23 June 1902. He received a primary-level education. Beginning in 1923 he became involved with the nascent nationalist and labour movements, writing articles for several newspapers. He spent three years in prison during the late 1920s and, shortly after joining the Indonesian National Party (Partai Nasional Indonesia), saw another two years in prison from 1930 to 1931. He later focused his energies on the theatre. By the mid-1930s he had joined the Bolero troupe, under the direction of Andjar Asmara. After leaving the troupe he spent some time directing radio dramas.

By 1940 Ariffien had entered film, making his debut on Harta Berdarah (Bloody Treasure). He co-directed the film, which followed a rich yet terrible man getting his comeuppance, with R. Hu for Union Films. The following year he made Asmara Moerni (Pure Passion), drawing the nationalist figure Adnan Kapau Gani to act in the film, which was targeted at well-educated audiences; the film was generally well received. He wrote one more film, Star's Tjioeng Wanara, and directed another, Wanita dan Satria, that year.

After the Empire of Japan occupied the Indies beginning in 1942, Ariffien worked with the Cultural Board (Keimin Bunka Syidosyo) and was given two opportunities to direct propaganda films for the studio Nippon Eigasha. However, the Indonesian film historian Misbach Yusa Biran suggests that a Japanese man named Kurata Bunjin was the actual director of these works, with Rd Ariffien as his assistant. The first, Berdjoang, was released in 1943 and was meant to entice Indonesians to join the army fighting for Japan; it was the only domestically produced feature film released in the Dutch East Indies during the occupation. The second, a short film entitled Keseberang, followed in 1944.

== Later career ==
Following the Japanese surrender in 1945 Ariffien took the equipment from Nippon Eigasha and fled to Yogyakarta, establishing Berita Film Indonesia there. During this time, with the Indonesian National Revolution in full force, he focused mainly on newsreels. Ariffien made his return to feature film in 1950, after the Dutch recognised Indonesia's independence, with Meratap Hati (Mourning the Heart), which showed a woman's misery after she was abandoned by her husband. The mid- to late-1950s was his most productive period; he completed more than half his films in the six-year period.

Ariffien joined Andjar Asmara in 1958 at the magazine Varia, working as an assistant. This preceded a drop in the number of films he made. In 1961, after Andjar's death, Ariffien became the leader of Varia. He would make his last film, Takkan Lari Gunung Dikedjar (literally The Mountain Won't Run if Chased) in 1965. The film showed a love triangle between a doctor's wife, a singer, and his girlfriend. Ariffien is recorded as editor of Varia as late as 1978.

== Filmography ==
Ariffien was involved with some 36 films, directing 33 (most of which he wrote himself); he also acted in one film.

=== Cast ===
- Taufan (1952)

=== Crew ===
- Harta Berdarah (Bloody Treasure; 1940) – Director
- Asmara Moerni (Pure Passion; 1941) – Director and scriptwriter
- Tjioeng Wanara (1941) – Scriptwriter
- Wanita dan Satria (The Woman and the Hero; 1941) – Director
- Berdjoang (Hope of the South; 1943) – Director and scriptwriter
- Keseberang (To the Other Side; 1944; short film) – Director
- Meratap Hati (Mourning the Heart; 1950) – Director
- Budi Utama (1951) – Director
- Rakjat Memilih (The People Choose; 1951) – Director
- Dewi dan Pemilihan Umum (Dewi and the Election; 1954) – Director
- Djakarta Diwaktu Malam (Jakarta at Night; 1954) – Director
- Eulis Atjih (1954) – Director
- Antara Tugas dan Tjinta (Between Duty and Love; 1954) – Director
- Konde Tjioda (1954) – Director and scriptwriter
- Lain Dulu Lain Sekarang (Different Then, Different Now; 1954) – Director and scriptwriter
- Gado-gado Djakarta (A Mix of Jakarta; 1955) – Director, screenwriter, and cinematographer
- Gali Lobang Tutup Lobang (Dig and Cover Holes; 1955) – Director
- Habis Manis Sepah Dibuang (1955) – Director
- Hanja Sepekan (Only a Week; 1955) – Screenwriter
- Hari Minggu (Sunday; 1955) – Director
- Ratu Kentjana (1955) – Director and screenwriter
- Korupsi (Corruption; 1956) – Director
- Pegawai Negeri (Civil Servant; 1956) – Director
- Konsepsi Ajah (Father's Conception; 1957) – Director and screenwriter
- Apa jang Kunanti? (What am I Awaiting?; 1957) – Director and screenwriter
- Bunga dan Samurai (Flowers and Samurai; 1958) – Director and screenwriter
- Wanita Indonesia (Indonesian Women; 1958) – Director
- Dibalik Dinding Sekolah (Behind the School Walls; 1961) – Director
- Kumbang dan Bunga (Bee and the Flower; 1961) – Director
- Limapuluh Megaton (Fifty Megatons; 1961) – Director
- Dara Kembar (Twin Girls; 1960) – Director and screenwriter
- Kekota (To the City; 1960) – Director
- Pendjual Koran (Paperboy; 1960) – Director and screenwriter
- Si Mamang (1960) – Director and screenwriter
- Takkan Lari Gunung Dikedjar (The Mountain Won't Run if Chased; 1965) – Director
