= Saeroen =

Indonesian writer

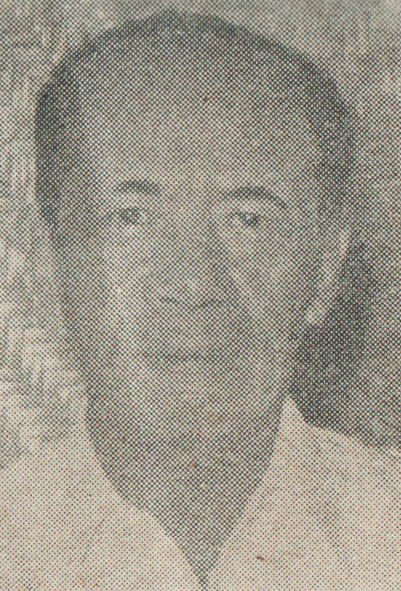
- Saeroen, c. 1958
- Born: Yogyakarta, Dutch East Indies
- Died: 6 October 1962; Bogor, Indonesia
- Other names: Kampret (pen name)
- Occupations: Journalist; Screenwriter
- Notable work: Terang Boelan

Saeroen (Perfected Spelling: Saerun; fl. 1920s–1962) was an Indonesian journalist and screenwriter. Born in Yogyakarta, he became a journalist after a time working at a railway station. By the mid-1930s he had established the daily Pemandangan with Oene Djunaedi and was writing editorials with the pen name Kampret. When the paper was dissolved, Saeroen drifted into the film industry as a writer, making his debut with Albert Balink's Terang Boelan (1937). Much of his later life was spent working with several minor publications.

== Early life and career ==
Saeroen was born in Yogyakarta, Dutch East Indies, to a courtier (abdi dalem) and his wife. After failing to complete his schooling at two different elementary schools, during which time he worked cleaning horse-drawn carriages and delivering newspapers, he passed a written test equivalent to an elementary school diploma. He then went to Batavia (modern-day Jakarta) to work at a train station. After several months he was asked to work at the railway employees' news publication, Vereniging van Spoor-en TramPersoneel.

Interested in the press, Saeroen left his job and became involved with several mainstream publications, including the Chinese-owned Siang Po and Keng Po. He later established the daily Pemandangan with Oene Djunaedi, writing heated editorials with the pen name Kampret (the Indonesian word for microbats). At the time editorials were mainstays of minor publications, and several reporters were better known by their pen names than their birth names. Although the newspaper's circulation grew quickly, Saeroen's editorials led to Pemandangan being closed by the Dutch colonial government in the mid-1930s. This reportedly followed a nationalist editorial in which Saeroen described Mohammad Husni Thamrin as prime minister of a "United Indonesian Republic".

== Film career ==
With Pemandangan closed and the newly established Antara news agency gaining greater strength, Saeroen was asked to head the native desk at the Dutch-run news agency Aneta, where he also served as a translator. Around 1936 Saeroen was approached by Albert Balink and the Wong brothers to work on their new film collaboration, Terang Boelan (Full Moon), reportedly first only to improve the dialogue but later as the primary scriptwriter. As Saeroen had had experience with the popular toneel theatrical troupes, he was able to write a story which drew on theatre traditions and became popular among natives. The film, a love story starring Rd. Mochtar and Roekiah, was a commercial success, earning 200,000 Straits dollars in British Malaya; it proved to be the most successful production in the area until 1953's Krisis (Crisis), released after Indonesia had become independent.

After the success of Terang Boelan and Balink's emigration to the United States, much of the cast and crew – including Saeroen – were signed with Tan's Film. Saeroen's first film with the company, Fatima (1938), was a commercial success, earning 200,000 gulden on a 7,000 gulden budget. Around 1939 he was arrested for influencing the national media with Japanese funds, spending nine months in prison. During that year he also wrote Gagak Item (Black Raven) for Tan's, a work inspired by Zorro.

Over the following two years Saeroen wrote four further films while continuing to write in Pemandangan, which had been reestablished. In 1940 he wrote two films for Union Film: Harta Berdarah (Bloody Treasure), a story about an accursed treasure; and Bajar dengan Djiwa (Pay with Your Soul), a drama following the interactions between several families, including the philanthropist Basuki and the ne'er-do-well Umar. A further film was completed for the company in 1941, Asmara Moerni. In 1942 Saeroen wrote two works for Star Film: Ajah Berdosa (Father Sins), and Pah Wongso Tersangka.

== Later life ==
Saeroen's activities during the Japanese occupation (1942–1945) and ensuing national revolution (1945–1949) are not known. He resurfaced in 1953 as a writer for several newspapers, including Lukisan Dunia, Dewan Rakjat, and Warta Bogor – the last of which he published himself. These writings were again published using the pen name Kampret.

Over the next several years Saeroen continued to work as a journalist while opening several hotels in Cipayung with bat-themed names, including Kampret, Kalong (flying foxes), and Kelelawar (roundleaf bats); he is also reported to have helped raise the children of Titien Sumarni after the actress' death. Saeroen died in Bogor, West Java, on 6 October 1962.

== Filmography ==
All as a screenwriter:

- Terang Boelan (Full Moon; 1937)
- Fatima (1938)
- Gagak Item (Black Crow; 1939)
- Harta Berdarah (Bloody Treasure; 1940)
- Bajar dengan Djiwa (Pay with Your Soul; 1940)
- Wanita dan Satria (The Woman and the Hero; 1941)
- Ajah Berdosa (Father Sins; 1941)
- Pah Wongso Tersangka (Pah Wongso the Suspect; 1941)
- Asmara Moerni (True Love; 1941)

== Bibliography ==
- Dibelakang Lajar Journalistiek Indonesia [Behind the Screens of Indonesian Journalism]. Batavia. 1936. OCLC 1827199.
