= Soerabaijasch Handelsblad =

Dutch-language newspaper in Surabaya

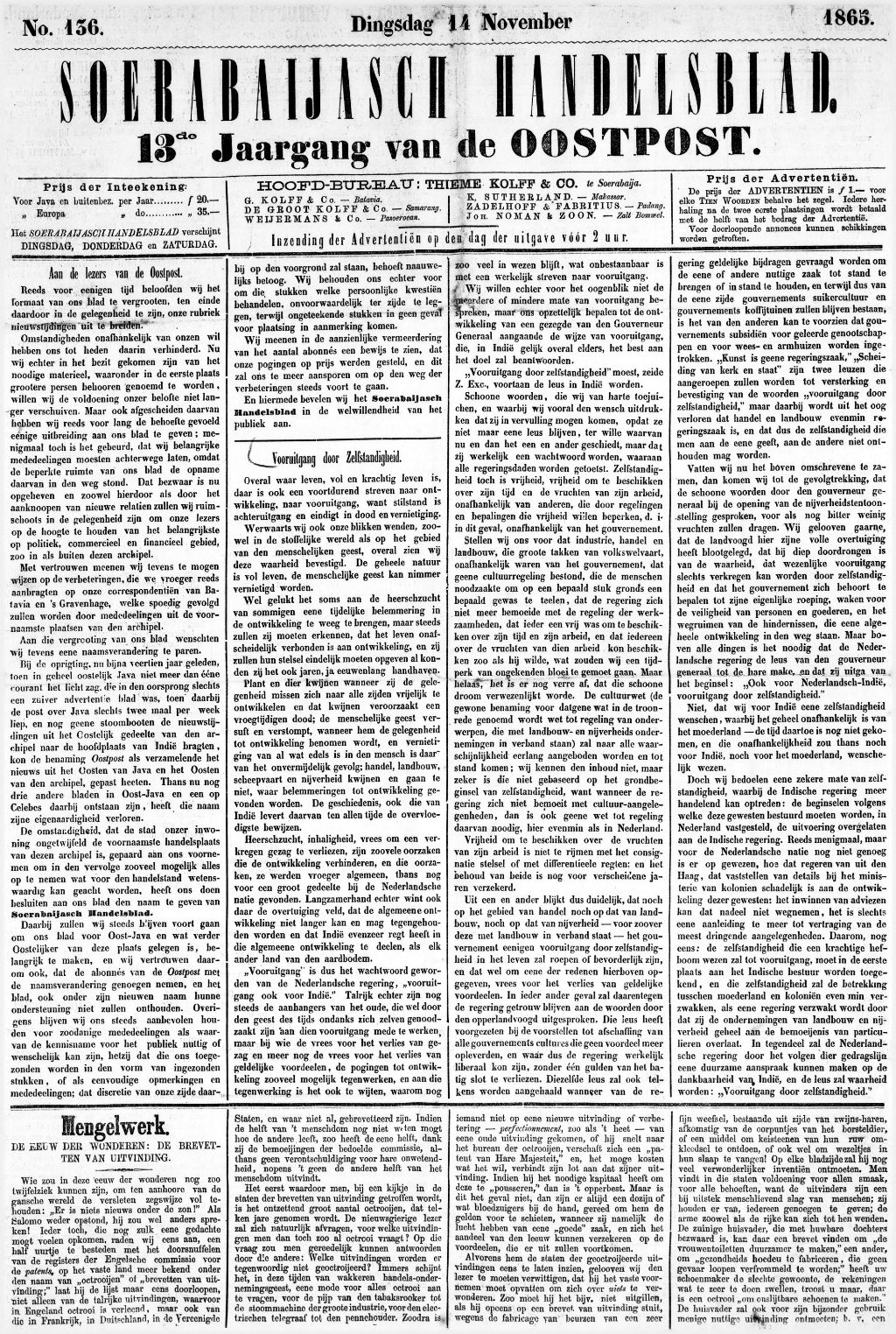
- Front page, 14 November 1865
- Format: Broadsheet
- Publisher: Kolff and Company
- Founded: 1853 (as De Oostpost)
- Ceased publication: 1942
- Relaunched: 1945–1957
- Language: Dutch
- City: Surabaya
- Country: Dutch East Indies
- OCLC number: 72769466

The Soerabaijasch Handelsblad ("Surabaya Commercial Paper") was a Dutch-language broadsheet in Surabaya, in what was then the Dutch East Indies. It was published by Kolff and Company.

Newspapers in Surabaya date to 1836, when the Dutch-language Soerabaijasch Advertentieblad was published. Soerabaijasch Handelsblad was established in 1853, under the name De Oostpost ("The Eastern Post"); it was the second newspaper published in Surabaya. Although the initial publication was limited to advertisements, the newspaper eventually began including news and items of general interest, including film and book reviews.

The name was changed in 1865 to Soerabaijasch Handelsblad, which remained in use until the newspaper was shut down in 1942, following the Japanese occupation of the Dutch East Indies. Although for most of its existence the newspaper was dated using the Gregorian calendar, from 17 May to 6 June 1942 (during the occupation, which lasted until 1945) it used the Japanese kōki (皇紀) calendar.

The Soerabaijasch Handelsblad was reestablished in 1945 as the Nieuwe Courant ("New Courant"); through 1946 it was billed as the official newspaper of the Allied Military Administration-Civil Affairs Branch, a semi-military organization tasked with restoring Dutch colonial administration and law in the recently proclaimed Republic of Indonesia, which claimed most of the Indies. This publication lasted until 1951, when it was renamed the Nieuw Soerabaiasch Handelsblad. The newspaper was ultimately shut down in 1957.

The Dutch newspaper archive Delpher.nl provides access to scans of the Soerabaijasch Handelsblad from two periods, 1865–1908 and 1929–1942. Scanning of this material was completed by the National Library of the Netherlands.
