= Netherlands Government Information Service =

Dutch government agency

The Netherlands Government Information Service (Dutch: Rijksvoorlichtingsdienst, RVD) is a Dutch government agency. The RVD is the official information service of the Dutch government and is the spokes-body for the prime minister, the Council of Ministers and the Royal House. The RVD is also responsible for providing public information on government policy, the prime minister and the Ministry of General Affairs.

In addition to its Information Service duties, the RVD is also responsible for giving advice on publicity and communications to several agencies and the Royal House, plus it coordinates between all the ministerial information services in The Netherlands.

Organisationally, the RVD is a directorate-general (DG) of the Ministry of General Affairs. It consists of the following sections:

- The management staff.
- The Press and Publicity department, whose primary duties are coordinating the public appearances of the members of the Royal House.
- The Information Services department, which is responsible for providing information regarding government policy to the prime minister and the chief civil servants at the ministry. This group collects and analyses data 24 hours a day from a myriad of sources (both open and confidential). The department also includes the "new media" group, which publishes the ministry and royal house websites and the government website.
- The Communications Policy department, which is responsible for defining the entire government (strategic) policy on communications and coordinating information provision between the ministries.
- The Directorate Public and Communication, which is the operational part of the RVD. This department seeks to improve communication between the government and the public. As an extension of this, the department is responsible for government contracting with third parties in the area of communications, communications project management, communications research and development of means of communication. The department is also responsible for running "Postbus 51" (PO Box 51), the government public information channel (which spreads government information through flyers, digital media, and other advertising channels).

As part of the coordinating responsibilities of the RVD, the DG of the RVD is also the chairman of the Voorlichtingsraad, which is the meeting place of all the information service directors of all the Dutch ministries. Previous DGs include Henk Brons, Gerard van der Wulp, and Eef Brouwers.
