= Pah Wongso Tersangka =

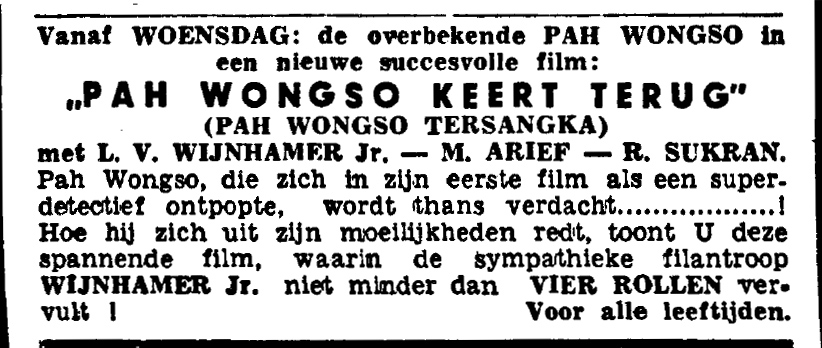
- Newspaper advertisement, Surabaya
- Directed by: Wu Tsun
- Screenplay by: Saeroen
- Produced by: Jo Eng Sek
- Starring: L. V. Wijnhamer Jr.; S Waldy; Sylvia Hatjirah
- Production company: Star Film
- Release date: 1941 (Dutch East Indies)
- Country: Dutch East Indies
- Language: Indonesian

Pah Wongso Tersangka (Indonesian for Pah Wongso Becomes a Suspect), also known under the Dutch title Pah Wongso Keert Terug (Pah Wongso Returns), is a 1941 film from the Dutch East Indies directed by Wu Tsun for Star Film. Saeroen's first work for the company, it is a sequel to the 1940 detective film Pah Wongso Pendekar Boediman, and stars the social worker L. V. Wijnhamer, Jr (better known as Pah Wongso) as a man who comes under suspicion and must clear his name. This possibly-lost film was styled as a comedy.

== Premise ==
Pah Wongso has come under suspicion and must clear his name.

== Production ==
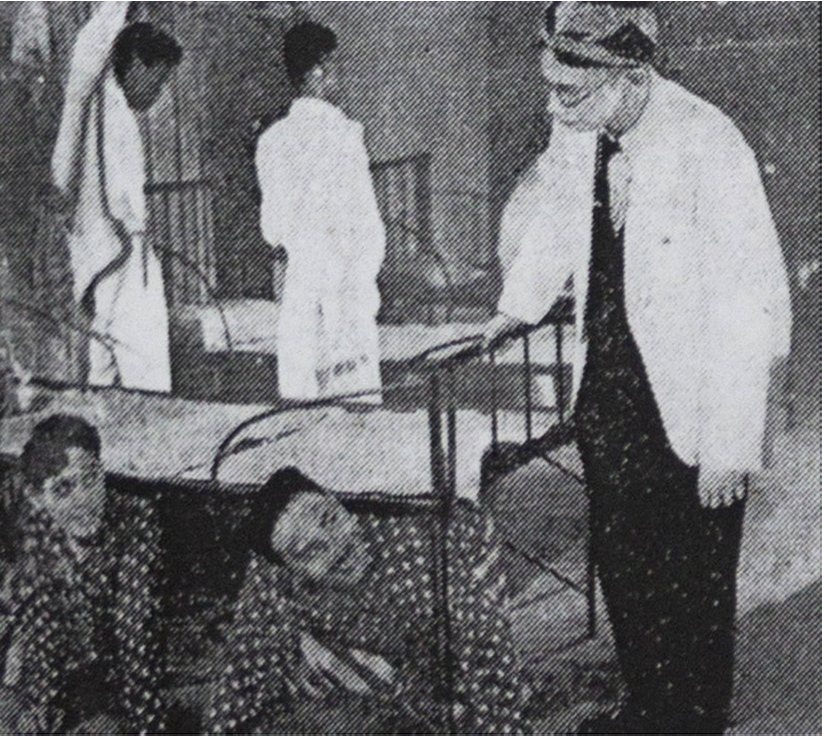
Pah Wongso (right) finds S Waldy and M Sarip under a bed in a scene from the film.

Pah Wongso Tersangka was directed by Wu Tsun for the Batavia- (now Jakarta-) based Star Film, owned by Jo Eng Sek. The film was a sequel to Pah Wongso Pendekar Boediman, a detective film which was directed and produced by Jo Eng Sek, one of the owners of the Batavia (now Jakarta) based Star Film. The earlier film, a popular success, had been written to cash in on the popularity of the Hollywood characters Charlie Chan and Mr. Moto. It served as a vehicle for the Indo social worker L. V. Wijnhamer Jr., who was popular within the ethnic Chinese community for his social work, raising funds for the Red Cross to aid people in China and helping abandoned children.

This black-and-white film was shot by Chok Chin Hsien, who had also handled the cinematography for Pah Wongso Pendekar Boediman. The story was written by Saeroen, who was signed from Union Film for this production. Saeroen had risen to fame after writing the box office hit Terang Boelan (1939), and his works for Tan's Film and Union had likewise been successes. Production had begun by September 1941.

Wijnhamer returned from the Pah Wongso Pendekar Boediman, and took up four different characters. Three further actors returned from the original film: M Arief, Primo Oesman, and R Sukran. Further main cast members included Sylvia Hatjirah, S Waldy, and M Sarip. Of these, only Waldy, who had made his debut in 1940's Zoebaida for Oriental Film, had previous film experience. Other cast members included Ma' Njai and Oemar.

Pah Wongso Tersangka emphasised comedy, rather than the detective story of the original. In an editorial in Pertjatoeran Doenia dan Film, "S." wrote that such ventures into comedy – a genre which had not developed in the Indies – was important for the film industry as it would provide appropriate viewing material for children. He deemed that the success of the comedic works of Charlie Chaplin, Buster Keaton, and Laurel and Hardy provided ample evidence that the Indonesian market would support comedies, and expressed hope that the film – which also featured singing – would "leave audiences rolling with laughter". (Note: Original: "membikin orang tertawa terpingkal-pingkal")

== Release ==
Pah Wongso Tersangka was screened by December 1941, and was reported to be well received. Also advertised under the Dutch title Pah Wongso Keert Terug (Pah Wongso Returns), it was rated for all ages. An advertisement in the Soerabaijasch Handelsblad promoted the film as "exciting", (Note: Original: "spannende") and emphasised the multiple roles taken by Wijnhamer. A novelisation of the film was published by the Yogyakarta based Kolff-Buning.

== Legacy ==
As Pah Wongso Tersangka was screening in cinemas, Star was working on its next film, Ajah Berdosa, which was released in January 1942. This proved to be the company's last production; with the Empire of Japan's invasion of the Indies in March 1942, all studios – including Star – were closed. When the domestic industry was revived in 1948, Waldy was the only cast member to return to cinema; beginning with Air Mata Mengalir di Tjitarum (1949), he acted in over forty films before his death in 1968. (Note: Pah Wongso Tersangka is the only film which Kristanto records in Sarip (Filmindonesia.or.id, M Sarip) and Hatjirah's filmographies (Filmindonesia.or.id, Sylvia Hatjirah). The film was likewise Wijnhamer's last (Filmindonesia.or.id, LV Wijnhamer).)

Pah Wongso Tersangka was screened as late as October 1947, but may now be lost. As elsewhere in the world, movies in the Indies then used highly flammable nitrate film, and after a fire destroyed much of Produksi Film Negara's warehouse in 1952, old films shot on nitrate were deliberately destroyed. As such, American visual anthropologist Karl G. Heider suggests that all Indonesian films from before 1950 are lost. However, Kristanto records several as having survived at Sinematek Indonesia's archives, and the film historian Misbach Yusa Biran writes that several Japanese propaganda films have survived at the Netherlands Government Information Service.

== Works cited ==
- Biran, Misbach Yusa, ed. (1979). Apa Siapa Orang Film Indonesia 1926–1978 [What and Who: Film Figures in Indonesia, 1926–1978]. Sinematek Indonesia. OCLC 6655859.
- Biran, Misbach Yusa (2009). Sejarah Film 1900–1950: Bikin Film di Jawa [History of Film 1900–1950: Making Films in Java] (in Indonesian). Jakarta: Komunitas Bamboo working with the Jakarta Art Council. ISBN 978-979-3731-58-2.
- Biran, Misbach Yusa (2012). "Film di Masa Kolonial" [Film in the Colonial Period]. Indonesia dalam Arus Sejarah: Masa Pergerakan Kebangsaan [Indonesia in the Flow of Time: The Nationalist Movement] (in Indonesian). Vol. V. Ministry of Education and Culture. pp. 268–93. ISBN 978-979-9226-97-6.
- Heider, Karl G (1991). Indonesian Cinema: National Culture on Screen. Honolulu: University of Hawaii Press. ISBN 978-0-8248-1367-3.
- "LV Wijnhamer". filmindonesia.or.id (in Indonesian). Konfiden Foundation. Archived from the original on 5 September 2014.
- "M Sarip". filmindonesia.or.id (in Indonesian). Konfiden Foundation. Archived from the original on 5 September 2014.
- "Pah Wongso Pendekar Boediman". filmindonesia.or.id (in Indonesian). Jakarta: Konfiden Foundation. Archived from the original on 2 December 2013.
- "Pah Wongso Tersangka". filmindonesia.or.id (in Indonesian). Jakarta: Konfiden Foundation. Archived from the original on 23 October 2014.
- Pah Wongso Tersangka. WorldCat. OCLC 65071608.
- S. (October 1941). "Tidakkah Indonesia Dapat Mengadakan Film Loetjoe?" [Can't Indonesians Make Comedies?]. Pertjatoeran Doenia Dan Film (in Indonesian). Batavia: 14–15.
- "Sampoerna: Pah Wongso Pendekar Boediman". Soerabaijasch Handelsblad (in Dutch). Surabaya. 19 June 1941. p. 7.
- "Sampoerna-theatre: 'Ajah Berdosa'". Soerabaijasch Handelsblad (in Dutch). Surabaya. 9 January 1942. p. 6.
- "Sylvia Hatjirah". filmindonesia.or.id (in Indonesian). Konfiden Foundation. Archived from the original on 5 September 2014.
- "Tirai Terbentang" [Open Curtains]. Pertjatoeran Doenia Dan Film (in Indonesian). 1 (7). Batavia: 28–29. December 1941.
- "(Untitled)". Soerabaijasch Handelsblad (in Dutch). Surabaya. 2 February 1942. p. 7.
- "(Untitled)". Het Dagblad (in Dutch). Jakarta. 23 October 1947. p. 4.
- "Waldemar Caerel Hunter". filmindonesia.or.id (in Indonesian). Konfiden Foundation. Archived from the original on 11 March 2014.
- "Warta dari Studio" [Reports from Studios]. Pertjatoeran Doenia Dan Film (in Indonesian). 1 (4). Batavia: 26–28. September 1941.
