= Ciung Wanara =

- King Surotama

8th King of Galuh
- Reign: 739 – 783
- Predecessor: Tamperan Barmavijaya
- Successor: Guruminda Sang Minisri
- Born: Manarah; 718; Kingdom of Sunda–Galuh
- Died: 798; Kingdom of Galuh
- Spouse: Kancanawangi
Regnal name
- Prabhu Jayaprakosa Mandalesvara Salakabuvana
- Father: Permana Dikusumah
- Mother: Naganingrum

Ciung Wanara is a legend among Sundanese people, in Indonesia. Ciung Wanara was a nickname of Prince Manarah of Sunda–Galuh Kingdom. He was a relative of the famous King Sanjaya of Mataram.

The folklore tells the legend of the Sunda Galuh kingdom, the origin of Pamali River's name as well as describes the cultural ties between Sundanese and Javanese living in the western part of Central Java province.

The legend of Ciung Wanara is often associated with Karang Kamulyan archaeological sites, a sub-district in Ciamis Regency, West Java.

== Sources ==
This story originates from a Sundanese oral tradition called Pantun Sunda, which then transferred into books written by some Sundanese writers, both in Sundanese and Indonesian.

== Summary ==
=== The abdication of the king ===
There was once a mighty kingdom in Java island, called Galuh, its capital was located in Galuh near present-day Ciamis. It was believed at that time the kingdom of Galuh spanned from Hujung Kulon, the Western tip of Java, to Hujung Galuh ("Galuh edge"), today the estuarine of Brantas River around modern Surabaya. The kingdom was ruled by King Prabu Permana Di Kusumah. After having reigned for a long time the King decided to become an ascetic and he therefore summoned his minister Aria Kebonan to the palace. Apart from this, Aria Kebonan had also to come to the king to bring a report about the kingdom. While he was waiting in the front pendopo, he saw servants busy walking back and forth, arranging everything for the king. The minister thought how nice it would be to be a king. Every command was obeyed, and every wish fulfilled. He therefore wanted to be a king also.

As he was daydreaming there, the king called him.

"Well, Aria Kebonan, is it true that you wish to be a king?" The king knew it because he was endowed with supernatural power.

"No, Your Highness, I shall not be able to."

"Do not lie, Aria Kebonan, I know it."

"Excuse me, Your Highness, I have just thought of it." "Well, I shall make you king. As long as I am away to meditate, you shall properly be king and rule. Then you shall not treat (slept with) my two wives, Dewi Pangrenyep and Dewi Naganingrum as your wife."

"All right, Your Highness."

"I shall change your appearance into a handsome man. Your name will be Prabu Barma Wijaya. Tell the people that the king has become young and I shall go to a secret place. Thus you shall be a king!"

In a moment Aria Kebonan's appearance resembled Prabu Permana di Kusumah's, but looked ten years younger. People believed his announcement that he was King Prabu Permana Di Kusumah who had become ten years younger and changed his name to Prabu Barma Wijaya. Only one man did not believe his story. It was Uwa Batara Lengser who knew the agreement between the king and the minister. Prabu Barma Wijaya became proud and humiliated Uwa Batara Lengser who could do nothing. He was also rude towards the two queens. Both avoided him, except in public when they behaved as if they were Prabu Barma Wijaya's wives.

=== The birth of two princes ===
One night both queens dreamt that the moon fell upon them. They reported it to the king which frightened him, as such a dream was usually a warning to women who were going to be pregnant. This was impossible as he was not guilty of treating both queens as his wives. Uwa Batara Lengser appeared and proposed to invite a new ascetic, called Ajar Sukaresi - who was none else than King Prabu Permana Di Kusumah - to explain the strange dream. Prabu Barma Wijaya agreed. As soon as the ascetic arrived at the palace he was asked by the king about the meaning of the dream.

"Both of the queens are expecting a child, Your Highness." Although startled by the answer, Prabu Barma Wijaya could still control himself. Eager to know how far the ascetic dared to lie to him, he put another question. "Will they be girls or boys?"

"Both are boys, Your Highness." At this, the king could no longer restrain himself, took out his kris, and stabbed Ajar Sukaresi to death. He failed. The Kris was crooked.

"Do you want me to be dead? In that case, I will I shall be dead." Then the ascetic fell. The king kicked the dead body so violently that it was thrown into the forest where it changed into a big dragon, called Nagawiru. At court, something strange happened. Both queens were indeed pregnant. After some time Dewi Pangrenyep gave birth to a son who was called Hariang Banga, while Dewi Naganingrum gave birth at a later date.

One day when Prabu Barma Wijaya was visiting Dewi Naganingrum, the unborn child spoke: "Barma Wijaya, you have already forgotten a lot of promises. The more you do cruel things, the shorter your power will last."

=== The evil conspiracy ===
This strange event of talking fetus made the King very angry and at the same time, he was afraid of the threat by the fetus. He wanted to get rid of it and soon he found a way to do that. He asked for Dewi Pangrenyep's help to be quiet of Dewi Naganingrum's baby who would be born as a rascal according to his dream. He would not be suitable for the ruler of the country together with Dewi Pangrenyep's son Hariang Banga. The queen believed it and agreed, but what was to be done?

"We shall exchange the baby with a dog and throw the child into the Citanduy River." Before childbirth, Dewi Pangrenyep advised Dewi Naganingrum to cover her eyes with malam (wax) usually used to print batik cloth. She argues that this treatment was to prevent the laboring mother from seeing too much blood that might knock her unconscious. Naganingrum agreed and Pangrenyep covered Dewi Naganingrum's eyes with some wax, pretending to help the poor queen. Naganingrum is unaware of what is happened, the newborn baby was put into a basket and thrown into the Citanduy River after a baby dog was laid on the lap of the unsuspecting mother.

Soon the queen knew that she was holding a baby dog and was very sad. The two evil-doers tried to get rid of Dewi Naganingrum by telling lies to the people, but nobody believed them. Even Uwa Batara Lengser could do nothing as the king as well as Queen Dewi Pangrenyep, was very powerful. Barma Wijaya even sentenced Dewi Naganingrum to death because she had given birth to a dog, which was considered a curse from the gods and shameful for the country. Uwa Batara Lengser got the instructions to carry out the execution. He took the poor queen to the woods, but he did not kill her, instead, he built a good hut for her. To convince the king and Dewi Pangrenyep that he had carried out the order, he showed them Dewi Naganingrum's bloodstained clothes.

=== The cockfighting ===
At the village Geger Sunten, by the Citanduy river, there lived an old couple who usually put their bow-net in the river to catch some fish. One morning they went to the river to fetch the bow-net and were very surprised to find a casket in the net instead of a fish. Opening it, they found a lovely baby. They carried the baby home and took care of it and loved it as their own.

As time went by the baby grew into a fine young man who accompanied the old man hunting in the woods. One day they saw a bird and a monkey.

"What bird and monkey are they, Father?"

"The bird is called Ciung and the monkey Wanara, my son."

"In that case, then call me Ciung Wanara." The old man agreed as the meaning of both words suited to the character of the boy.

One day he asked the old man why he was different from the other boys in the village and why they honoured him so much. Then the old man told him that he had been driven to the place in a box and was not a boy from the village.

"Your parents are surely noble people from Galuh."

"In that case, I have to go thither in search for my real parents, Father."

"That is right, but you should go with a friend. In the casket, there is an egg. Take it, go to the wood, and find a fowl to hatch it."

Ciung Wanara took the egg, made for the wood as told by the old man, but he could not find a fowl. Instead, he found Nagawiru who was kind to him and who offered him to hatch the egg. He laid the egg under the dragon and shortly after it was hatched. The chick grew up rapidly. Ciung Wanara put it in the basket, left the old man and his wife, and made his journey to Galuh.

In the capital of Galuh, cockfighting was a big sporting event, as both the king and its people loved it. King Barma Wijaya has an undefeated fierce and large rooster (cock) named Si Jeling. In his pride, he proclaimed that he would grant any wish to any game-cock owner who could defeat his champion rooster.

On arriving there the Ciung Wanara's chick had already grown into a big and strong game-cock. While Ciung Wanara was looking for the owner of the casket, he took part in a royal cockfighting tournament. His cock never lost. The news about the young man whose rooster always won at cockfighting also reached Prabu Barma Wijaya who ordered Uwa Batara Lengser to find the young man. The old man immediately learns that he is Dewi Naganingrum's long-lost son, especially when Ciung Wanara shows him the casket in which he had been thrown into the river. Uwa Batara Lengser told Ciung Wanara that the king had ordered such besides accusing his mother of having given birth to a dog.

"If your rooster wins in the fight against that of the king, just ask him half of the kingdom as a reward for your victory."

The next morning Ciung Wanara appeared in front of Prabu Barma Wijaya and told him what Lengser had proposed. The king agreed as he was sure of the victory of his rooster, called Si Jeling. Si Jeling is slightly larger than Ciung Wanara's rooster; however, Ciung Wanara's rooster is more powerful since it was hatched by the Nagawiru dragon. In this blood sport, the king's rooster lost its life in the fight and the king was compelled to fulfill his promise to give Ciung Wanara half of his kingdom.

=== The battle of brothers ===
Ciung Wanara became king of half of the kingdom and had an iron prison built to keep bad people. Ciung Wanara planned a plot to punish Prabu Barma Jaya and Dewi Pangrenyep. One day Prabu Barma Jaya and Dewi Pangrenyep are invited by Ciung Wanara to come and inspect the newly built prison. As they were inside, Ciung Wanara shut the door and locked them inside. He made it known to the people of the country about the evil deeds of Barma and Pangrenyep, and the people cheered.

However, Hariang Banga, Dewi Pangrenyep's son, was sad to learn about the capture of his mother. He organized a revolt, gathered some troops, and led a war against his younger brother. In a battle, he attacked Ciung Wanara and his followers. Both Ciung Wanara and Hariang Banga are powerful princes with great skill in pencak silat martial arts. However, Ciung Wanara managed to push Hariang Banga to the eastern bank of Brebes River. The battle continues inconclusively and nobody wins. All of a sudden there appeared King Prabu Permana Di Kusumah accompanied by Queen Dewi Naganingrum and Uwa Batara Lengser.

"Hariang Banga and Ciung Wanara!" the king said, "Stop fighting! It is pamali - ('taboo' or 'forbidden' in both Sundanese and Javanese languages) - fighting against own brothers. You are brothers, both of you are my sons. Both of you will reign in this land, Ciung Wanara in Galuh and Hariang Banga in the eastern Brebes River, the new country. May this river become the boundary and change its name from Brebes River to Pamali River to remind you two it is pamali to fight your brother. Let Dewi Pangrenyep and Barma Wijaya who was Aria Kebonan remain in prison for their sins." Since then the name of the river has been known as Pamali River.

Hariang Banga moved eastward and is known as Jaka Susuruh. He established the kingdom of Java and became the king of Java, and his faithful followers became the ancestors of the Javanese people. Ciung Wanara ruled the Galuh kingdom justly, his people are Sundanese people, since then Galuh and Java have been prosperous again as in the days of Prabu Permana Di Kusumah. While heading west, Ciung Wanara sang this legend in Pantun, while his older brother headed east doing the same reciting the epic in Tembang.

== Interpretation ==
The legend is Sundanese folklore to explain the origin of the name Pamali River, as well as to explain the origin of the Sundanese relationship with Javanese; as the two competing brothers that ruled on the same island (Java). Also according to this belief, Sundanese regard Javanese as their older sibling, yet the kingdom in the land of Sunda (Galuh kingdom) is older than kingdoms established in East and Central Java. This somehow corresponds to the historical fact that the oldest kingdom in Java was indeed located in West Java, the Tarumanagara kingdom.

== Adaptations ==
In 1941 Ciung Wanara was adapted as a film by Jo Eng Sek of Star Film. Entitled Tjioeng Wanara, the film starred R Sukran, Elly Joenara, AB Djoenaedi, Muhammad Arief, and S Waldy.

== See also ==
- West Java
- Cindelaras
