= Bengawan Solo =

Bengawan Solo may refer to:

- Bengawan Solo River, the longest river on the Indonesian island of Java and site of paleoanthropology early hominid remains
- "Bengawan Solo" (song), a 1940 Indonesian song about the Javanese river by Gesang Martohartono
- Bengawan Solo (1949 film), a 1949 Indonesian film directed by Jo An Djan
- Bengawan Solo, a 1951 Japanese film by Kon Ichikawa
- Bengawan Solo, a 1971 remake of the 1949 film directed by Sofia WD, Willy Wilianto, and Bay Isbahi
- Bengawan Solo (company), a baking company in Singapore
