= Lintah Darat =

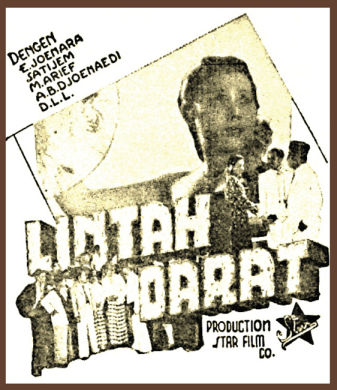
- Theatrical poster
- Directed by: Wu Tsun
- Produced by: Jo Eng Sek
- Starring: Elly Joenara; Satijem; M. Arief; Aboebakar Djoenaedi; S Waldy
- Production company: Star Film
- Release date: 28 August 1941 (Dutch East Indies)
- Country: Dutch East Indies
- Language: Malay

Lintah Darat ([lɪnˈtah daˈrat]; Malay for Loan Shark) is a 1941 film from the Dutch East Indies (now Indonesia) directed by Wu Tsun and produced by Jo Eng Sek.

== Plot ==
Sisters Asnah and Kumala are polar opposites: Asnah is rude and rough, whereas Kumala is polite and refined. When she is disappointed that the boy of her dreams, Safi'i, is more interested in her sister, Asnah decides to go to Batavia (now Jakarta) to become a singer. Though she becomes rich, Asnah refuses to share her money with her family.

The sisters' mother falls ill, and because Asnah has not given the family any of her earnings, Kumala must borrow from a loan shark named Karim; unknown to Kumala, Karim has married Asnah. The treatment paid for by this loan is unsuccessful and her mother dies. All of the family's possessions are repossessed to pay back the debt.

Kumala complains to Safi'i, who has been working to remove known loan sharks from the area, and he responds by orchestrating an attack against the loan shark, who has since divorced Asnah. After the loan shark is removed, Kumala and Safi'i can live happily ever after.

== Production ==
Lintah Darat, produced by Jo Eng Sek for Star Film, was directed by Wu Tsun. The black-and-white film featured cinematography by Chok Chin Hsien. It starred Elly Joenara, Satijem, M. Arief, Aboebakar Djoenaedi, and S Waldy. Joenara had already starred in several films for Star, including Tjioeng Wanara.

== Release and legacy ==
A test screening of Lintah Darat, which was targeted at audiences over the age of 17, was held in Batavia on 28 August 1941; this test screening received full audiences and a positive review from De Indische Courant. A review from Surabaya for the Soerabaijasch Handelsblad found the film interesting and easy to follow, particularly praising the condemnation of usury. By the end of September 1941 the film was being shown in Medan.

Advertisements for Lintah Darat date as late as December 1948 in the Indies and November 1949 in Singapore, where it was advertised as "one of the greatest Malay films". The film is now likely lost. The American visual anthropologist Karl G. Heider writes that all Indonesian films from before 1950 are lost. However, JB Kristanto's Katalog Film Indonesia (Indonesian Film Catalogue) records several as having survived at Sinematek Indonesia's archives, and Biran writes that several Japanese propaganda films have survived at the Netherlands Government Information Service.

== Works cited ==
- Biran, Misbach Yusa (2009). Sejarah Film 1900–1950: Bikin Film di Jawa [History of Film 1900–1950: Making Films in Java] (in Indonesian). Jakarta: Komunitas Bambu working with the Jakarta Art Council. ISBN 978-979-3731-58-2.
- "Deli Bioscoop 'Lintah Darat'" [Deli Theatre 'Lintah Darat']. De Sumatra Post (in Dutch). Medan. 24 September 1941. p. 3.
- "Dinsdag 28 December" [Tuesday 28 December]. Deli Courant en De Sumatra Post (in Dutch). Medan. 28 December 1948. p. 4.
- Heider, Karl G (1991). Indonesian Cinema: National Culture on Screen. Honolulu: University of Hawaii Press. ISBN 978-0-8248-1367-3.
- "Lintah Darat". filmindonesia.or.id (in Indonesian). Jakarta: Konfiden Foundation. Archived from the original on 10 November 2013.
- "'Lintah Darat': Nieuwe productie der Star Film Coy" ['Lintah Darat': New Production of the Star Film Company]. De Indische Courant (in Dutch). Surabaya. 29 August 1941. p. 6.
- "Sampoerna Theater 'Lintah Darat'". Soerabaijasch Handelsblad (in Dutch). Surabaya. 20 November 1941. p. 6.
- "(untitled)". Soerabaijasch Handelsblad (in Dutch). Surabaya. 18 November 1941. p. 7.
- "(untitled)". The Straits Times. Singapore. 11 November 1949. p. 3.
