= Air Mata Mengalir di Tjitarum =

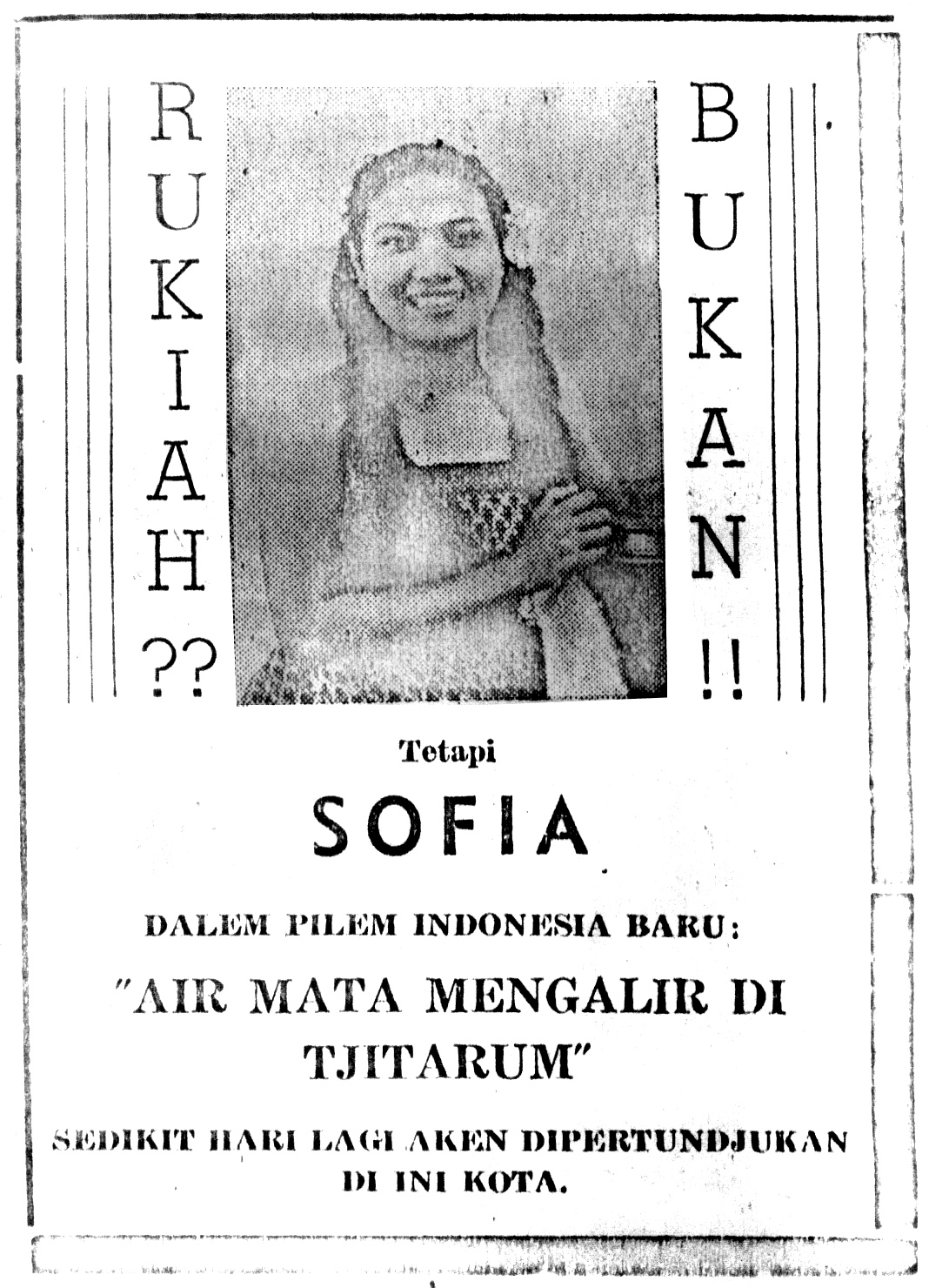
- Advertisement
- Directed by: Roestam Sutan Palindih
- Screenplay by: Roestam Sutan Palindih
- Starring: Sofia; S Waldy
- Cinematography: Joshua Wong; Othniel Wong
- Production companies: Wong & Tan Bros.
- Release date: 1948
- Countries: Indonesia; Dutch East Indies
- Language: Indonesian

Air Mata Mengalir di Tjitarum (Indonesian pronunciation: [ˌaɪr ˌmat̪a məˌŋalɪr di tʃiˈt̪arʊm]; Perfected Spelling: Air Mata Mengalir di Citarum; Indonesian for "Tears Flow in Citarum") is a 1948 film from what is now Indonesia, (Note: The film was released during the Indonesian National Revolution, in which time Indonesia had declared itself independent while the Dutch East Indies was still formally in existence.) written and directed by Roestam Sutan Palindih for the Tan & Wong Bros Film Company.

== Production ==
Following the Japanese occupation of the Dutch East Indies in March 1942, Tan's Film was shut down. During the occupation all films produced were works of propaganda, and after the Indonesian National Revolution began in 1945 no new films were made. In 1948 the owners of Tan's Film, the brothers Tan Khoen Yauw and Khoen Hian, worked with brothers Joshua and Othniel Wong to establish the Tan & Wong Bros Film Company. They soon began production of their first film, Air Mata Mengalir di Tjitarum.

The film was written and directed by Roestam Sutan Palindih, a journalist-cum-writer who had directed two short films during the Japanese occupation. Air Mata Mengalir di Tjitarum starred Sofia, her husband S Waldy (pseudonym of Waldemar Caerel Hunter), and Rd Endang all had had experience on stage during the Occupation. Air Mata Mengalir dari Tjitarum was the feature film debut of Sofia and Rd Endang. The black-and-white film's sound and cinematography was split between the Wong brothers.

== Release and reception ==
Air Mata Mengalir di Tjitarum was released in 1948, and at least one advertisement took advantage of the lasting star power of Roekiah, who had been the main draw of Tan's Film; the advertisement included the line "Roekiah? No! But Sofia in a new Indonesian film, Air Mata Mengalir di Tjitarum". The film was the second domestic feature production since the end of the occupation, following Andjar Asmara's Djaoeh Dimata for the South Pacific Film Corporation. Both films had similar themes, but ultimately Air Mata dari Tjitarum was the bigger box-office hit.

== Legacy ==
Roestam did not direct Tan & Wong Bros next production, Bengawan Solo (1949), and only wrote one further film, Terang Bulan (1950). He spent much of his later life as documentarian. Sofia and Waldy acted in several further films together, including Bengawan Solo, and both later went into directing; they divorced in 1964. Rd Endang remained a popular star until 1956, when he left the film industry. Tan & Wong Bros produced several further films after the release of Air Mata Mengalir di Tjitarum; in 1955 they changed the company's name to Tjendrawasih Film.

The film is probably lost. As was the case in the rest of the world, movies in the East Indies were shot on highly flammable nitrate film, and after a fire destroyed much of Produksi Film Negara's warehouse in 1952, many films shot on nitrate were deliberately destroyed. As such, American visual anthropologist Karl G. Heider suggests that all Indonesian films from before 1950 are lost. However, J.B. Kristanto's Katalog Film Indonesia records several as having survived at Sinematek Indonesia's archives, and the film historian Misbach Yusa Biran writes that several Japanese propaganda films have survived at the Netherlands Government Information Service.

== Works cited ==
- "Air Mata Mengalir di Tjitarum". filmindonesia.or.id (in Indonesian). Jakarta: Konfiden Foundation. Archived from the original on 2 December 2013.
- Biran, Misbach Yusa, ed. (1979). Apa Siapa Orang Film Indonesia 1926–1978 [What and Who: Film Figures in Indonesia, 1926–1978]. Sinematek Indonesia. OCLC 6655859.
- Biran, Misbach Yusa (2009). Sejarah Film 1900–1950: Bikin Film di Jawa [History of Film 1900–1950: Making Films in Java] (in Indonesian). Jakarta: Komunitas Bamboo working with the Jakarta Art Council. ISBN 978-979-3731-58-2.
- Biran, Misbach Yusa (2012). "Film di Masa Kolonial" [Film in the Colonial Period]. Indonesia dalam Arus Sejarah: Masa Pergerakan Kebangsaan [Indonesia in the Flow of Time: The Nationalist Movement] (in Indonesian). Vol. V. Ministry of Education and Culture. pp. 268–93. ISBN 978-979-9226-97-6.
- Heider, Karl G (1991). Indonesian Cinema: National Culture on Screen. Honolulu: University of Hawaii Press. ISBN 978-0-8248-1367-3.
- Imanjaya, Ekky (2006). A to Z about Indonesian Film (in Indonesian). Bandung: Mizan. ISBN 978-979-752-367-1.
- "Kredit Air Mata Mengalir di Tjitarum" [Credits for Air Mata Mengalir di Tjitarum]. filmindonesia.or.id (in Indonesian). Jakarta: Konfiden Foundation. Archived from the original on 29 June 2017.
- "Rustam Sutan Palindih". filmindonesia.or.id (in Indonesian). Jakarta: Konfidan Foundation. Archived from the original on 22 February 2014.
- Said, Salim; McGlynn, John H.; Heider, Karl G (1991). Cinema of Indonesia: Eleven Indonesian Films, Notes & Synopses. New York: Festival of Indonesia Foundation. ISBN 978-1-879578-00-5.
- "Tan & Wong Bros". filmindonesia.or.id (in Indonesian). Jakarta: Konfiden Foundation. Archived from the original on 19 February 2014.
