= Roestam Sutan Palindih =

The names Sutan and Palindih are honorifics. The subject should be referred to by his given name, Roestam.

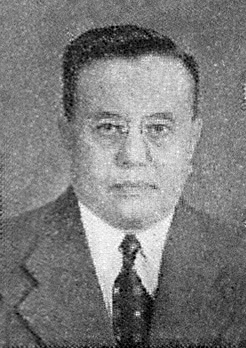
Roestam, 1954

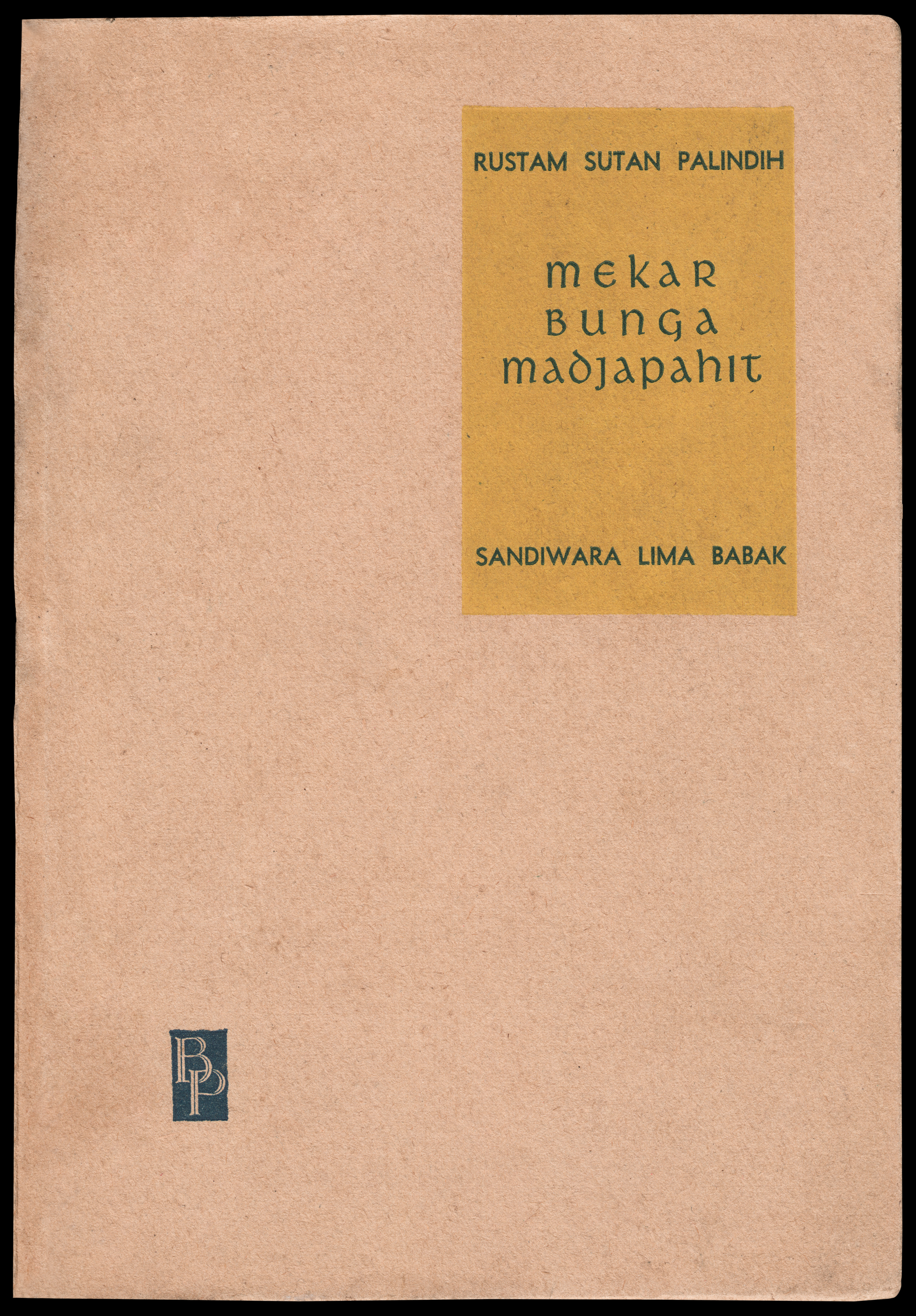
Roestam Soetan Palindih, Mekar Bunga Madjapahit (1949 printing)

Roestam Sutan Palindih (Perfected Spelling: Rustam Sutan Palindih) was an Indonesian film director and writer. He was born in Sungai Puar, Agam Regency, near Fort de Kock, Dutch East Indies (now Bukittinggi, Indonesia) in September 10, 1898. He finished his education in various cities, including Batavia (now Jakarta), Bandung, Padang, and Medan. In the 1920s and 30s Rustam held a variety of jobs, including as the owner of a small shop and a farmer. He eventually became involved with the journalistic and literary industries, working at Balai Pustaka and heading the newspaper Neratja. From 1933 until 1938 he was a member of a native political council, vocally opposing the Dutch colonial presence in the Indies.

Rustam began his involvement with the local film industry during the 1940s, writing novelisations of films by Tan Tjoei Hock and Soeska. After the Empire of Japan occupied the Indies beginning in 1942, he collaborated with the Japanese forces in making the short propaganda films Di Desa and Di Menara for the studio Nippon Eigasha. During the Indonesian National Revolution (1945–1949) that followed the occupation Rustam directed his only feature film, Air Mata Mengalir di Tjitarum (Tears Flow in Tjitarum), in 1948, which was the feature film debut of Sofia WD. His last work in the film industry, a script entitled Terang Bulan (Full Moon), was filmed in 1950 and directed by Mustadjab. Starring Sofia and Rd Mochtar, the production followed two lovers separated by crime, war, and family who are ultimately able to reunite.

By the 1950s, after Indonesia's independence was recognised, Rustam had become mostly a literary documentarian, although he continued to publish some works on the subject. He also wrote on the nation's politics and recorded a version of the folktale Lutung Kasarung. He died in 1971 after several years of ill health.

== Filmography ==
Palindih directed two short propaganda films and one feature film. He wrote a total of four films:

- Di Desa (In the Village; 1943; short film) – Director and screenwriter
- Di Menara (In the Tower; 1943; short film) – Director and screenwriter
- Air Mata Mengalir di Tjitarum (Tears Flow in Tjitarum; 1948) – Director and screenwriter
- Terang Bulan (Full Moon; 1950) – Story
