= Tjioeng Wanara =

1941 film

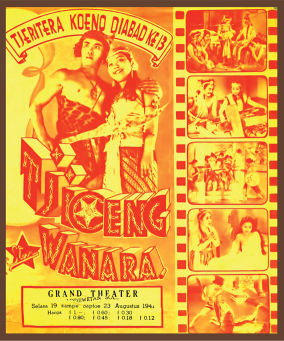
- One sheet
- Directed by: Jo Eng Sek
- Screenplay by: Rd Ariffien
- Produced by: Jo Eng Sek
- Starring: R Sukran; Elly Joenara; AB Djoenaedi
- Production company: Star Film
- Release date: 18 August 1941 (Dutch East Indies)
- Country: Dutch East Indies
- Language: Indonesian

Tjioeng Wanara (Indonesian pronunciation: [ˌtʃiʊŋ waˈnara]; Perfected Spelling: Ciung Wanara) is a 1941 film from the Dutch East Indies (modern-day Indonesia) directed and produced by Jo Eng Sek. Starring R Sukran, Elly Joenara and AB Djoenaedi, it featured more than 500 people in supporting roles. The film follows a young prince named Tjioeng Wanara who must reclaim his throne from the cruel King of Galuh; it is adapted from the Sundanese legend of the same name.

The second production by Star Film, Tjioeng Wanara was released 18 August 1941. It was advertised heavily, emphasising the fact that the scholar Poerbatjaraka had served as the historical adviser and that the film was based on Balai Pustaka's version of the legend. It premiered to commercial success, but received mixed reviews. This black-and-white production, which was screened until at least 1948, is now thought lost.

== Plot ==
In 1255 Saka, Permana Dikoesoemah is the King of Galuh, beloved by his people and his wife Naganingroem. The minister Aria Kebonan wants power for himself, and persuades the king to surrender the crown to him. Permana Dikoesoemah warns Aria Kebonan to respect him always and not to bother his wife. He then abdicates to meditate, ultimately ascending to a higher plane of existence. Aria Kebonan, meanwhile, magically gains the king's appearance, ensuring that the people of Galuh are unaware that they have a new king.

Aria Kebonan proves to be an unpopular ruler. One day, he hears that both Naganingroem and the king's former concubine, Dewi Pangrenjep, are pregnant. With Dewi Pangrenjep, Aria Kebonan plans to eliminate Naganingroem's son. During childbirth the son is replaced with a dog, while Dewi Pangrenjep takes the newborn and throws him into a river. He is later found and rescued by farmers, who name him Tjioeng Wanara. Dewi Pangrenjep, meanwhile, gives birth to a son, Aria Banga.

Years pass, and Tjioeng Wanara grows to be a strong young man. Aria Banga, meanwhile, has taken over the throne and rules with an iron fist, hated and feared by his people. Tjioeng Wanara returns to Galuh and overthrows the king, arresting Aria Kebonan and Dewi Pangrenjep; Aria Banga, however, is able to escape and establish the kingdom of Majapahit. Tjioeng Wanara rules kindly over his people and later moves his capital to Pajajaran.

== Production ==
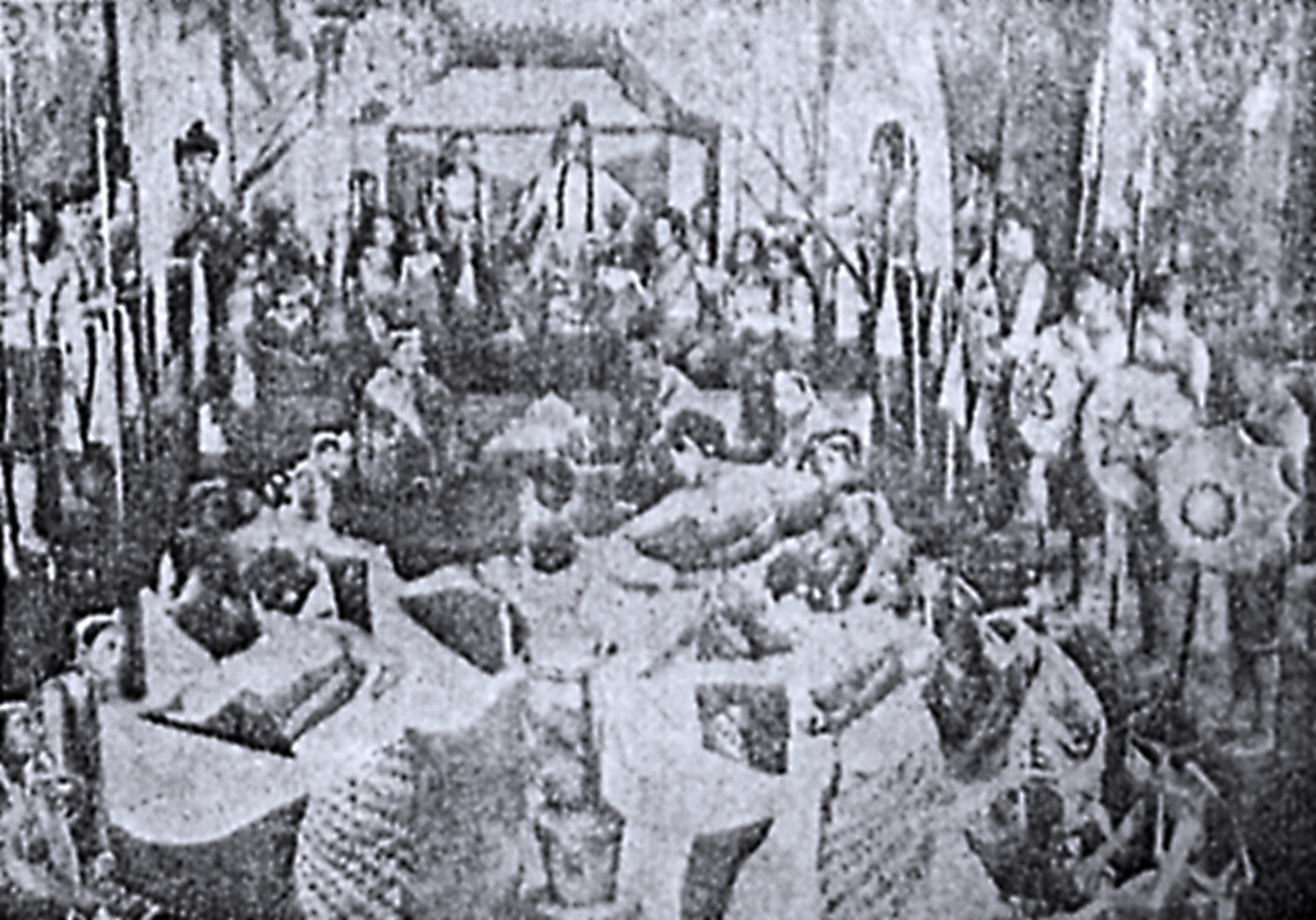
A production still from the film, showing many supporting actors

Tjioeng Wanara was directed and produced by Jo Eng Sek for Star Film. It was the second production by both Jo and the company, following Pah Wongso Pendekar Boediman in 1941. Poerbatjaraka, a scholar of traditional literature, served as the historical adviser to the production. Cinematography for the black-and-white film was handled by Chok Chin Hsien. By June 1941 production was almost complete.

The film starred R Sukran, Elly Joenara, AB Djoenaedi, Muhamad Arief, and S Waldy. Waldy had made his film debut in 1940's Zoebaida for Oriental Film Company, later joining Star for Pah Wongso; Joenara and Arief had begun their cinema careers in the latter film. Tjioeng Wanara featured the first on-screen performances by Djoenaedi and Sukran. The stars were supported by over 500 extras and actors in bit parts. As such, JB Kristanto's Katalog Film Indonesia records the production as the first "colossal" film in the Indies, in terms of scale.

Tjioeng Wanara was based on a Sundanese legend of the same name, retold by M. A. Salmoen in a 1938 Balai Pustaka-published edition which was then adapted by Rd Ariffien; as such, a review in the Bataviaasch Nieuwsblad found that the film contained little of the original tale except for the characters' names. The film featured traditional arts such as the Serimpi dance.

== Release and reception ==
Though initially slated for a July 1941 release, Tjioeng Wanara ultimately premiered at the Orion Theatre in Batavia (now Jakarta) on 18 August 1941. It was publicised extensively, often emphasising the role of Poerbatjaraka and using the name of Balai Pustaka, the official publishing house of the Dutch East Indies government known for its printed versions of traditional tales, in advertisements. The film was rated for all ages.

The premiere of Tjioeng Wanara was shown to a packed theatre. Reception of the film, however, was mixed. An anonymous review in the Soerabaijasch Handelsblad was positive, considering the film to be successful in its adaptation of the legend, while another, in the same newspaper, recommended it. Indonesian film historian Misbach Yusa Biran, however, writes that some viewers considered the film "nothing more than a stage play brought to the silver screen". (Note: Original: "tidak lain dari wayang orang atau ketoprak yang dipindahkan ke layar perak")

== Legacy ==
Star made four further films before it was closed in 1942, when the Japanese occupied the Indies; Jo Eng Sek did not direct again. After writing Tjioeng Wanara, Ariffien left Star Film to work at a circus; Biran writes that he was disappointed over the work's poor reception. Joenara, Arief, and Waldy remained in the film industry; Joenara went on to be a producer, while Arief and Waldy later took up directing. Neither Djoenaedi nor Sukran are recorded as making another film.

Tjioeng Wanara was screened as late as June 1948, though it is now likely lost. All movies were then shot using flammable nitrate film, and after a fire destroyed much of Produksi Film Negara's warehouse in 1952, old films shot on nitrate were deliberately destroyed. As such, American visual anthropologist Karl G. Heider suggests that all Indonesian films from before 1950 are lost. However, Kristanto records several as having survived at Sinematek Indonesia's archives, and Biran writes that several Japanese propaganda films have survived at the Netherlands Government Information Service.

== Works cited ==
- "AB Djoenaedi". filmindonesia.or.id (in Indonesian). Jakarta: Konfiden Foundation. Archived from the original on 2 February 2014.
- Apa Siapa Orang Film Indonesia [What and Who: Film Figures in Indonesia] (in Indonesian). Jakarta: Indonesian Ministry of Information. 1999. OCLC 44427179.
- Biran, Misbach Yusa, ed. (1979). Apa Siapa Orang Film Indonesia 1926–1978 [What and Who: Film Figures in Indonesia, 1926–1978]. Sinematek Indonesia. OCLC 6655859.
- Biran, Misbach Yusa (2009). Sejarah Film 1900–1950: Bikin Film di Jawa [History of Film 1900–1950: Making Films in Java] (in Indonesian). Jakarta: Komunitas Bamboo working with the Jakarta Art Council. ISBN 978-979-3731-58-2.
- Biran, Misbach Yusa (2012). "Film di Masa Kolonial" [Film in the Colonial Period]. Indonesia dalam Arus Sejarah: Masa Pergerakan Kebangsaan [Indonesia in the Flow of Time: The Nationalist Movement] (in Indonesian). Vol. V. Ministry of Education and Culture. pp. 268–93. ISBN 978-979-9226-97-6.
- Fientje (June 1941). "Tjioeng Wanara di atas Layar Perak" [Tjioeng Wanara on the Silver Screen]. Pertjatoeran Doenia Dan Film (in Indonesian). 1 (1). Batavia: 48–49.
- "Filmaankondiging Orion: "Tjioeng Wanara"" [Film Announcement, Orion: 'Tjioeng Wanara']. Bataviaasch Nieuwsblad (in Dutch). Batavia. 19 August 1941. p. 6.
- Heider, Karl G (1991). Indonesian Cinema: National Culture on Screen. Honolulu: University of Hawaii Press. ISBN 978-0-8248-1367-3.
- "Kredit Tjioeng Wanara" [Credits for Tjioeng Wanara]. filmindonesia.or.id (in Indonesian). Jakarta: Konfiden Foundation. Archived from the original on 2 February 2014.
- "M Arief". filmindonesia.or.id (in Indonesian). Jakarta: Konfiden Foundation. Archived from the original on 2 February 2014.
- "R Sukran". filmindonesia.or.id (in Indonesian). Jakarta: Konfiden Foundation. Archived from the original on 2 December 2013.
- "Sampoerna: 'Tjioeng Wanara'". Soerabaijasch Handelsblad (in Dutch). Surabaya. 28 August 1941. p. 4.
- "Sampoerna: 'Tjioeng Wanara'". Soerabaijasch Handelsblad (in Dutch). Surabaya. 28 August 1941. p. 6.
- "Tjioeng Wanara". filmindonesia.or.id (in Indonesian). Jakarta: Konfiden Foundation. Archived from the original on 2 December 2013.
- "(untitled)". Soerabaijasch Handelsblad (in Dutch). Surabaya. 26 August 1941. p. 7.
- "(untitled)". Pelita Rakjat (in Indonesian). Surabaya. 23 June 1948. p. 4.
- "Warta dari Studio" [Reports from the Studios]. Pertjatoeran Doenia Dan Film (in Indonesian). 1 (2). Batavia: 27. July 1941.
