= Star Film (Dutch East Indies company) =

Former Dutch East Indies film production company

Star Film Company
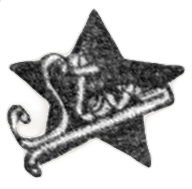
- Logo, 1941
- Type: Private
- Industry: Film
- Founded: Batavia, Dutch East Indies (1940)
- Defunct: 1942
- Fate: Dissolved
- Headquarters: Batavia, Dutch East Indies
- Area served: Dutch East Indies
- Key people: Cho' Chin Hsin; Jo Eng Sek
- Products: Motion pictures

Star Film was a film production company in the Dutch East Indies. Established by Chinese-Indonesian businessman Jo Eng Sek and Chinese cameraman Cho' Chin Hsin in 1940, it produced five black-and-white films in 1940 and 1941; two of these were directed by Jo, and the remainder were directed by Wu Tsun. Another film was under production when the studio was closed following the Japanese occupation of the Dutch East Indies. Star helped establish the careers of actors such as S Waldy and Elly Joenara, and produced screenplays written by Rd Ariffien and Saeroen; its output, however, is probably lost. The company's films received wide releases in the Indies, with some screened as far away as British Malaya, China, and Singapore.

== History ==
Star Film was established by Jo Eng Sek, who had previous film experience as co-producer of Si Tjonat (1929), and Shanghai-based cameraman Cho' Chin Hsin; for much of the life of the company, Jo would take the role of producer while Cho' would be on camera. The company's headquarters were located at Prinsenlaan, Batavia (now Mangga Besar, Jakarta). The company released its first film, Pah Wongso Pendekar Boediman, in April 1941. For this detective film, Star signed L. V. Wijnhamer Jr., an Indo social worker popular with the ethnic Chinese community. The film was a commercial success, allowing the company to expand.

Later Jo signed Rd Ariffien as a screenwriter; the studio touted this as a victory, owing to Ariffien's wide network as a journalist. He wrote a single work for the company, Tjioeng Wanara, based on the Sundanese legend as retold by M. A. Salmoen in a 1938 Balai Pustaka-published edition; this was directed and produced by Jo. Several actors cast for the film continued with Star for the remainder of its existence, including comedian S Waldy and future film producer Elly Joenara. However, Ariffien left Star owing to dissatisfaction over Tjioeng Wanara.

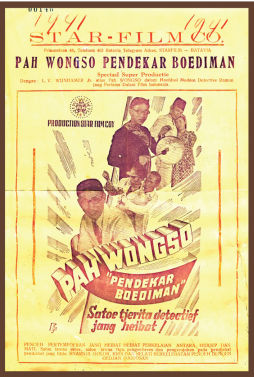
Poster for Pah Wongso Pendekar Boediman, the company's first production

Star continued expanding, and Jo brought aboard Chinese director Wu Tsun, whose first film for the company was Lintah Darat. It had begun production before the release of Tjioeng Wanara and dealt with a family torn apart by dealings with a loan shark. This production received positive reviews. Star then produced a sequel to Pah Wongso Pendekar Boediman, again with Wu at the helm, and drew the journalist Saeroen as writer. In this film, titled Pah Wongso Tersangka, Star emphasised comedy, relying on the interactions between Waldy, Pah Wongso, and the comedian Sarip.

Saeroen wrote one more film for Star in 1941, Ajah Berdosa, before leaving the company. This film, which follows a villager named Mardiman over a period of several years in which he loses everything owing to his infatuation with a "modern" woman, was advertised as "an extremely simple and touching story" (Note: Original: "Een uiterst eenvoudig en ontroerend verhaal...") and received positive reviews. By late 1941, Star was producing an adaptation of the One Thousand and One Nights, titled 1001 Malam. At the time several contemporary works were being adapted from Nights, including Tan's Film's Aladin and Koeda Sembrani, Populair's Film's Moestika dari Djemar, and Java Industrial Film's Ratna Moetoe Manikam.

By early 1942, the colonial government of the Dutch East Indies had become concerned with the possibility of an invasion by the Empire of Japan. This fear reached the general populace, and the February 1942 edition of film magazine Pertjatoeran Doenia dan Film reported that several studios would move away from the colonial capital of Batavia or go on a production hiatus. Star, though production of 1001 Malam was incomplete, was reported to be preparing to move. When the Japanese occupied the Indies in March 1942, Star was closed, never to reopen.

== Filmography ==
Star Film produced six films in two years. All were feature length, black-and-white works, receiving wide releases in the Dutch East Indies. Some, such as Pah Wongso Pendekar Boediman, were reportedly screened as far away as British Malaya, China, and Singapore. Though its films were screened at least into the late 1940s, (Note: A screening of Lintah Darat is recorded in November 1949 in Singapore (The Straits Times 1949, (untitled)), and Tjioeng Wanara was shown in Surabaya in 1948 (Pelita Rakjat 1948, (untitled)).) the company's output is likely lost. (Note: All movies at the time were shot on highly flammable nitrate film, and after a fire destroyed much of Produksi Film Negara's warehouse in 1952, old films shot on nitrate were deliberately destroyed (Biran 2012, p. 291). As such, American visual anthropologist Karl G. Heider suggests that all Indonesian films from before 1950 are lost (Heider 1991, p. 14) However, J.B. Kristanto's Katalog Film Indonesia records several as having survived at Sinematek Indonesia's archives, and the film historian Misbach Yusa Biran writes that several Japanese propaganda films have survived at the Netherlands Government Information Service (Biran 2009, p. 351).)

- Pah Wongso Pendekar Boediman (1940)
- Tjioeng Wanara (1941)
- Lintah Darat (1941)
- Pah Wongso Tersangka (1941)
- Ajah Berdosa (1941)
- 1001 Malam (unfinished)

== Works cited ==
- Biran, Misbach Yusa (2009). Sejarah Film 1900–1950: Bikin Film di Jawa [History of Film 1900–1950: Making Films in Java] (in Indonesian). Jakarta: Komunitas Bamboo working with the Jakarta Art Council. ISBN 978-979-3731-58-2.
- Biran, Misbach Yusa (2012). "Film di Masa Kolonial" [Film in the Colonial Period]. Indonesia dalam Arus Sejarah: Masa Pergerakan Kebangsaan [Indonesia in the Flow of Time: The Nationalist Movement] (in Indonesian). Vol. V. Ministry of Education and Culture. pp. 268–93. ISBN 978-979-9226-97-6.
- Heider, Karl G (1991). Indonesian Cinema: National Culture on Screen. Honolulu: University of Hawaii Press. ISBN 978-0-8248-1367-3.
- "Lintah Darat". filmindonesia.or.id (in Indonesian). Jakarta: Konfiden Foundation. Archived from the original on 10 November 2013.
- "'Lintah Darat': Nieuwe productie der Star Film Coy" ['Lintah Darat': New Production of the Star Film Company]. De Indische Courant (in Dutch). Surabaya. 29 August 1941. p. 6.
- "Pah Wongso Tersangka". filmindonesia.or.id (in Indonesian). Jakarta: Konfiden Foundation. Archived from the original on 2 December 2013.
- Pah Wongso Tersangka. WorldCat. OCLC 65071608.
- "Saeroen". filmindonesia.or.id (in Indonesian). Jakarta: Konfiden Foundation. Archived from the original on 10 November 2013.
- "Sampoerna Theater 'Lintah Darat'". Soerabaijasch Handelsblad (in Dutch). Surabaya. 20 November 1941. p. 6.
- "Sampoerna-theatre: 'Ajah Berdosa'". Soerabaijasch Handelsblad (in Dutch). Surabaya. 9 January 1942. p. 6. Archived from the original on 10 November 2013.
- Sardiman (2008). Guru Bangsa: Sebuah Biografi Jenderal Sudirman [Teacher of the People: A Biography of General Sudirman] (in Indonesian). Yogyakarta: Ombak. ISBN 978-979-3472-92-8.
- "Studio Nieuws" [Studio News]. Pertjatoeran Doenia Dan Film (in Indonesian). 1 (5). Batavia: 26–28. October 1941.
- "Studio Nieuws" [Studio News]. Pertjatoeran Doenia Dan Film (in Indonesian). 1 (9). Batavia: 18–20. February 1942.
- "Tjioeng Wanara". filmindonesia.or.id (in Indonesian). Jakarta: Konfiden Foundation. Archived from the original on 2 December 2013.
- "(untitled)". Soerabaijasch Handelsblad (in Dutch). Surabaya. 7 January 1942. p. 7.
- "(untitled)". Pelita Rakjat (in Indonesian). Surabaya. 23 June 1948. p. 4.
- "(untitled)". The Straits Times. Singapore. 11 November 1949. p. 3.
- "Warta dari Studio" [Reports from the Studios]. Pertjatoeran Doenia Dan Film (in Indonesian). 1 (1). Batavia: 18–20. June 1941.
