= Cindelaras =

Javanese folklore figure

Cindelaras is a character from East Javanese folklore. His main story involves his mother giving birth to him in the forest, his finding a strong rooster he raises to take part in cockfighting, and finally reuniting with his father, the king.

== Summary ==
Prince Cindelaras was the son of Raden Putra. His mother was exiled from Janggala Kingdom because she was blamed for the poisoning of the king's concubine. Later, she gave birth to a young boy named Cindelaras. One day, Cinderalas found an egg that had been dropped by an eagle. He took care of the egg that hatched to become a mythical talking rooster. The rooster told Cinderalas about his father, a king of Janggala Kingdom, Raden Putra. Cindelaras then went to the palace with his magic chicken to meet his father. There he found that many people like cockfighting, and signed up his chickens to compete. It killed all the other roosters in a cockfight.

When the king heard the news, he challenged Cindelaras to another cockfight. When Cindelaras's rooster won, it started talking about Raden Putra being Cindelaras's father. Raden Putra was shocked to discover this and picked up the queen from the forest where she was exiled. They lived happily together. The concubine was imprisoned (some sources say the concubine went into exile due to embarrassment).

== Variants ==
In an Indonesian tale titled Panji Lara's Rooster, translated to Russian as "Петух Панджи Лараса" ("The Rooster of Panji Laras"), raja Prabu Joyo Kusumo has many wives, and dotes on the youngest one, the most beautiful, but not one of noble origin. The beautiful co-wife, jealous of her elder rival, feigns illness and claims that the eldest queen poisoned her. The raja beats the elder queen and orders the vizir to take her to the forest, kill her and bring back proof of his deed. The vizier spares the queen, but takes out her eyes to present them to the raja, and orders his two slaves, Putro Kenchono and Setunto, to protect her. The three live in a hut in the forest, and the queen gives birth to a son whom they name Panji Laras ("the prince born in the forest"). One day, he sees a kite carrying something in its claws and dropping it. Panji Laras notices it is an egg which hatches a chick. The boy raises the bird until it becomes a rooster, which crows to Panji Laras. The boy wants to test the rooster's strength and asks his mother if he can join a cockfighting competition in another village of Revnya. Panji Laras's rooster beats the other fighting birds, and news of his successes reaches the ears of the raja, who wishes to see the boy's rooster in action. The raja meets the youth, with whom he feels a strange connection, and they make a bet on their respective birds. Panji Laras's rooster defeats and kills the raja's rooster. The raja is intrigued by the boy and asks him about his origins: he says his name is Panji Laras and he lives in the forest. The monarch sees the boy's two slaves and recognizes their faces: they are the vizier's two slaves. The vizier, fearing for his life, kneels and reveals the whole truth to the raja. The man is happy that Panji Laras is his son and his elder queen is alive. Panji Laras then takes his mother's eyes from a hidden spot and marches with a royal retinue to his forest hut. Once there, the blind queen is greeted by her son, who restores her sight, and the raja, her husband. The raja returns with his elder queen and his son Panji Laras, and banishes the younger queen.

In another tale, titled The Cock of Panji Laras, the son of a rajah of Banten moves out to the forest, meets a beautiful girl and marries her. Two months before she gives birth to their child, the prince learns that his father is ill and returns to Banten to assume the throne. As for this wife, while she is still pregnant, a bird flies overhead and drops a wounded chick on her lap. The girl gives birth to a son named Panji Laras, and she nurses the wounded little bird. Panji Laras grows up, and the chick becomes a mighty rooster that the boy uses in many cockfighting battles. His father, the new king of Banten, who is addicted to cockfighting, sets up a battle between their respective birds. Panji Laras's rooster comes out the victor, and the king discovers he is his son. The king reunites with his wife and child.

== See also ==
- Panji Laras
- Ciung Wanara
