= Pah Wongso Pendekar Boediman =

1941 Dutch East Indies film

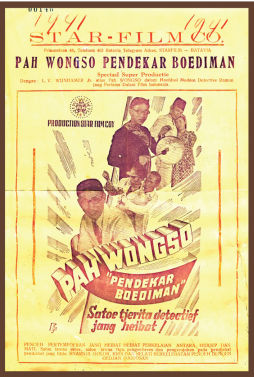
- Poster
- Produced by: Jo Eng Sek
- Starring: L. V. Wijnhamer Jr.; Elly Joenara; Mohamad Arief
- Cinematography: Cho' Chin Hsin
- Production company: Star Film
- Release date: 1 April 1941 (Dutch East Indies)
- Country: Dutch East Indies
- Language: Indonesian

Pah Wongso Pendekar Boediman (Malay for Pah Wongso the Righteous Warrior) is a 1941 detective film from the Dutch East Indies (now Indonesia). The first production by Star Film, it was produced by Jo Eng Sek and features camerawork by Cho' Chin Hsin. Starring Pah Wongso, Elly Joenara and Mohamad Arief, it follows the social worker Pah Wongso as he investigates a murder to clear his protégé's name.

The first film of its genre to be produced in the Indies, Pah Wongso Pendekar Boediman was made to capitalize on the popularity of Wijnhamer and Hollywood characters such as Charlie Chan and Mr. Moto. Released in April 1941 to popular acclaim, it had a mixed critical reception; the reviewer Saeroen suggested that its success was entire because of its star's renown. A sequel to this film, Pah Wongso Tersangka, was released later in 1941 but is possibly lost.

== Plot ==
Pah Wongso is a nut seller, social worker, and schoolmaster who lives in Batavia and takes care of the local poor. One day his young protégé Wisnoe saves the life of a young woman named Siti when she is almost hit by a carriage. Thankful, her father Haji Abdullah gives Wisnoe a job at his rice mill. Wisnoe's zeal and diligence quickly make him stand out from his fellow employees and he begins to woo Siti, who returns his affections.

However, Wisnoe's cousin Bardja is envious of his newfound success. A gambler who frequents prostitutes, Bardja is smitten with Siti, who does not love him. Hoping to eliminate his competition, Bardja hires some thugs to kill Wisnoe; this attempt fails, and Bardja's financial situation becomes increasingly desperate. He decides to steal from his rich uncle but is caught in the act. In the ensuing struggle, he kills the older man, then frames Wisnoe for the murder.

Wisnoe is arrested, and soon Pah Wongso – warned by Siti of Bardja's previous treachery – begins to investigate the case. Ultimately he discovers that Bardja is the true murderer and confronts him, resulting in a battle to the death. Wongso emerges victorious, and Wisnoe's name is cleared. (Note: Plot summary derived from Soerabaijasch Handelsblad 1941, Sampoerna.)

== Production ==
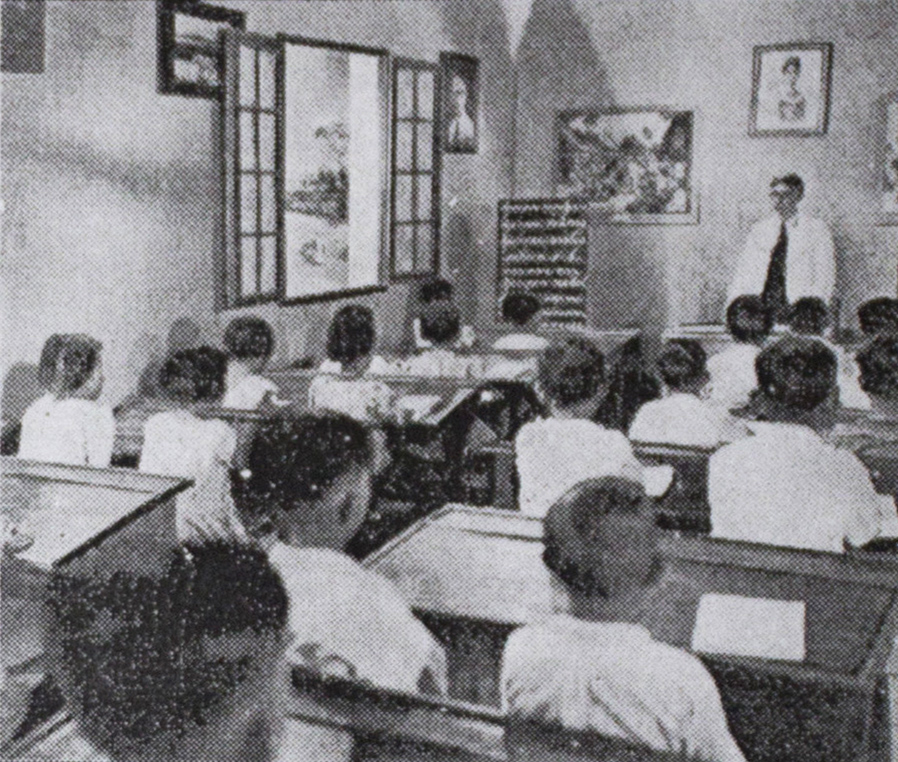
Pah Wongso teaching, in a scene from the film

Pah Wongso Pendekar Boediman was produced by Jo Eng Sek, a businessman who had produced the film Si Tjonat in 1929. Cinematography on this black-and-white film was handled by Cho' Chin Hsin, who had recently immigrated from Shanghai. The film was the first production of Star Film, a studio which Jo and Cho' had established in Prinsenland, Batavia (now Mangga Besar, Jakarta).

At the time, the Hollywood characters Charlie Chan and Mr. Moto were popular in the Indies, as were imported detective films in general; however, no films in that genre had yet been produced domestically. This led Jo to make a detective film which he thought would be successful with ethnic Chinese audiences. For this, he approached L. V. Wijnhamer, Jr., an Indo man who was popular within the ethnic Chinese community for his social work; Wijnhamer, better known as Pah Wongso, helped educate abandoned children, ran an employment office, and raised funds for Red Cross aid in war-torn China. Wijnhamer accepted the role.

To support Wongso, stage actress Elly Joenara was cast as Siti, making her film debut, while Mohamad Arief appeared as Wisnu. Other cast members included Djoenaedi, R. Sukran, and Miss Satijem. To ensure that fight scenes went smoothly, Jo hired members of Primo Oesman's silat and boxing group to perform as criminals; Oesman, a professional boxer, also appeared in the film.

== Release and reception ==
Pah Wongso Pendekar Boediman was rated for audiences over the age of 17. It premiered at the Rex Theatre in Batavia on 1 April 1941, following a short speech by Wijnhamer. It had reached Surabaya by June, where it was advertised as a film of intrigue, life, and death. Although intended predominantly for domestic consumption, it was also screened in China, Singapore and British Malaya. When the film reached Singapore in July 1941, it was touted as a "thrilling Malay detective story ... full of thrills and excitement from beginning to end".

The Indonesian film historian Misbach Yusa Biran records Pah Wongso Pendekar Boediman as a commercial success. Critical reviews, however, were mixed. An anonymous reviewer in the Bataviaasch Nieuwsblad praised the quality of the film, particularly its cinematography, acting, and story. In the Malayan magazine Film Melayu, a reviewer considered the film of similar quality to Hollywood productions and praised its casting of a southeast Asian as the titular detective. (Note: This despite Wijnhamer's Eurasian descent (Barnard 2010, p. 65).) The critic and film writer Saeroen expressed concern that the film's success was not because of its quality, and opined that it was only popular because of Wijnhamer's fame.

== Legacy ==
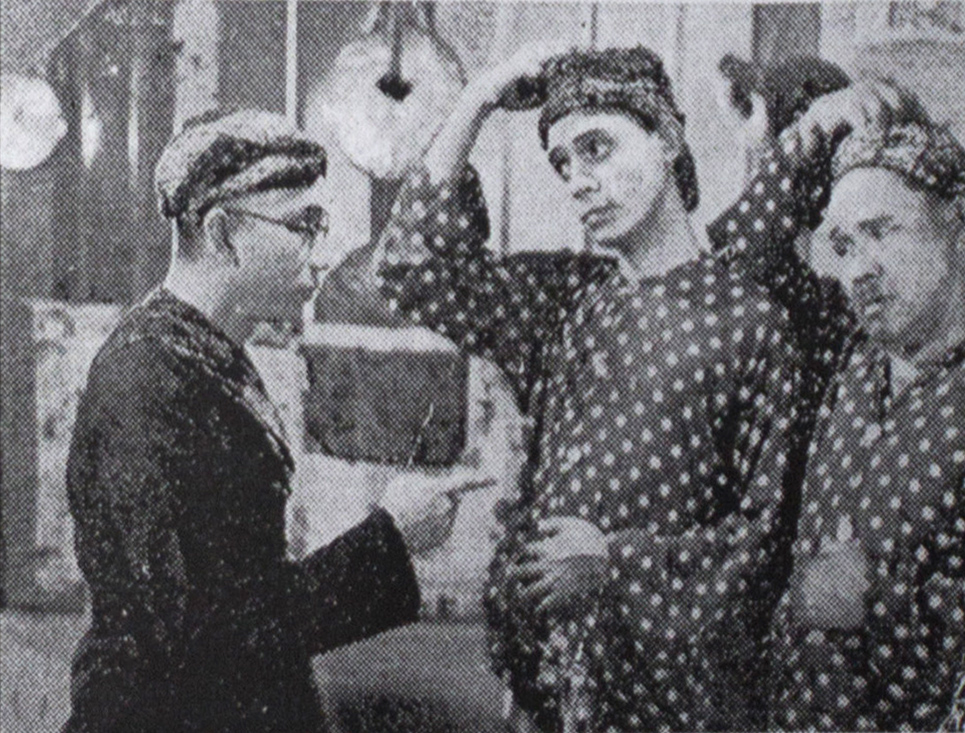
Pah Wongso (left) with S. Waldy and M. Sarip in the sequel Pah Wongso Tersangka

By September 1941, Jo had begun production of a second – and final – film starring Wongso, titled Pah Wongso Tersangka (Pah Wongso Becomes a Suspect). Directed by Wu Tsun, this late 1941 release featured Pah Wongso in four roles and showed him attempting to clear his name after being framed for a crime. Arief, Primo, and Sukran were also recast in this film, which was billed as the colony's first comedy film. Although Joenara did not return for Pah Wongso Tersangka, she acted in three further films for Star; her acting career continued into the 1950s, and she became a producer in the early 1970s.

Pah Wongso Pendekar Boediman may be lost. Movies were then shot on flammable nitrate film, and after a fire destroyed much of Produksi Film Negara's warehouse in 1952, old films shot on nitrate were deliberately destroyed. Thus, the American visual anthropologist Karl G. Heider wrote that all Indonesian films from before 1950 are lost. However, JB Kristanto's Katalog Film Indonesia (Indonesian Film Catalogue) records several as having survived at Sinematek Indonesia's archives, and Biran writes that several Japanese propaganda films have survived at the Netherlands Government Information Service.
