= S. Waldy =

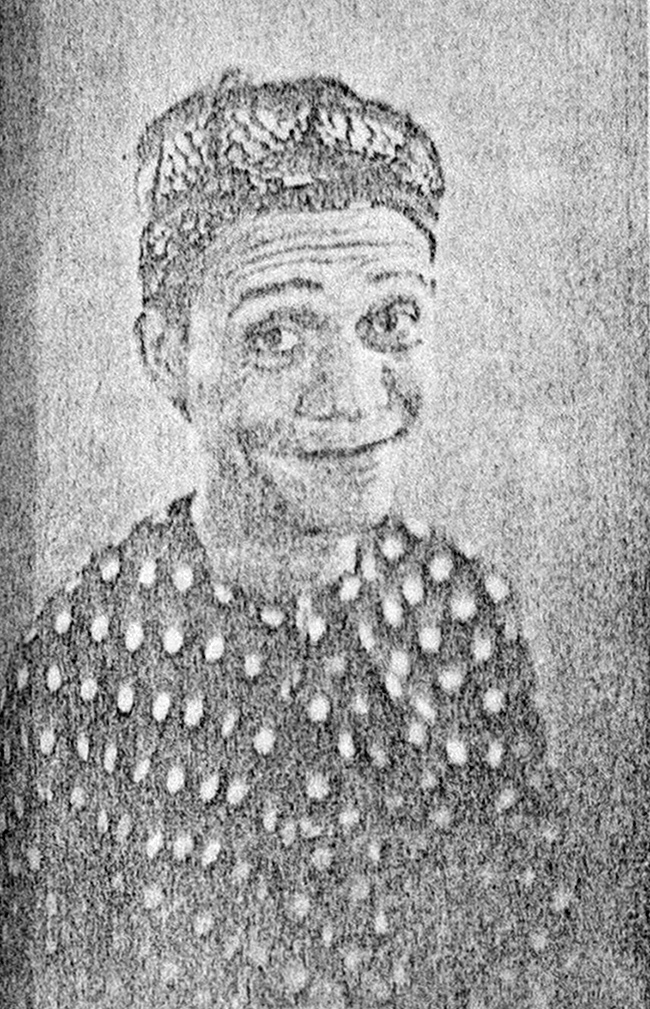
- Waldy in a promotional still for Pah Wongso Tersangka (1941)
- Born: Waldemar Caerel Hunter; 15 December 1919; Blitar, Dutch East Indies
- Died: 1968 (aged 48–49)
- Occupation: Actor

Waldemar Caerel Hunter (15 December 1919 – 1968), best known by his stage name S. Waldy, was an Indonesian stage and film actor.

== Biography ==
Waldy was born in Blitar, in Java, on 15 December 1919 and was one of fourteen children born to J. R. Hunter (also known as Osman) and L. W. Winterberg who were of English and German descent, respectively. Both were stage actors with the Sri Permata Opera, and often traveled. Interested in theatre, he ran away from his elementary school in Yogyakarta to join a troupe in Klaten, under the leadership of Djafar Wirjo.

Although Waldy was taken as a porter, Wirjo taught him stage techniques as well. Waldy's parents ultimately decided to support his career and help him learn to lead a cabaret. In the early 1930s, Waldy joined a variety of troupes, including Faroka Opera and Grand Nooran Opera. He toured the Maritime Southeast Asia, reaching Siam and the Malay Peninsula, and further refined his craft with the input of actors such as Rd Ismail. In 1938, he attempted to establish his own troupe. Named Vaudeville, it was unsuccessful and quickly folded.

In 1940, Waldy was approached to act in Zoebaida, a film directed by Njoo Cheong Seng for Oriental Film. He accepted the role, and also served as songwriter for the film. Over the next three years he took a variety of film roles for Star Film, including Ajah Berdosa, Lintah Darat, Tjioeng Wanara, and Pah Wongso Tersangka (all 1941).

After the Japanese occupation began in March 1942, most studios were closed. Waldy migrated back to the stage, first joining Djawa Baru before establishing his own troupe, starring Dewi Mada. By the mid-1940s he had met Sofia, an actress with the Fifi Young troupe; the two were married by 1948.

Feature film production in the Indies recommenced in 1948, amidst the Indonesian National Revolution, a military and political conflict between the newly proclaimed Republic of Indonesia and the returning Dutch colonial forces. Waldy and Sofia joined Tan & Wong Bros. and made their debut together in Air Mata Mengalir di Tjitarum; for this film, Waldy again took the role of songwriter. Film scholar Ekky Imanjaya writes that Tan & Wong Bros attempted to cash in on the success of their previous incarnation, Tan's Film. Sofia was advertised based on her resemblance to Tan's star Roekiah, and Waldy bore a physical resemblance to Roekiah's husband, the comedian Kartolo.

This was followed by several further films, including Bengawan Solo (1949) and Air Mata Pengantin (1952). By 1950's Tirtonadi, Waldy had begun to have a behind the scenes role, serving as cinematographer. In 1953, beginning with Musafir Kelana, Tan & Wong put Waldy in charge of their subsidiary, Ardjuna Film, and he began to direct regularly – though often taking acting roles in the films he directed. His most active year was 1954 during which he appeared in five films. A 1955 article in Doenia Film credited Waldy with the discovery of several rising stars, including Elly Joenara, Zainal Abidin, and Sukarno M. Noor.

Waldy and Sofia divorced in 1964. The actress remarried quickly, to WD Mochtar. Waldy married Elviana, who took his name, becoming Elviana Waldy. He died four years later, in 1968.

== Filmography ==
=== Actor ===
- Zoebaida (1940)
- Lintah Darat (1941)
- Ajah Berdosa (1941)
- Pah Wongso Tersangka (1941)
- Tjioeng Wanara (1941)
- Air Mata Mengalir di Tjitarum (1948)
- Bengawan Solo (1949)
- Bantam (1950)
- Pantai Bahagia (1950), as R.M. Riyono
- Terang Bulan (1950)
- Tirtonadi (1950)
- Air Mata Pengantin (1952)
- Abunawas (1953)
- Dendang Sajang (1953)
- Musafir Kelana (1953)
- Mustafa dan Tjintjin Wasiatnja (1953)
- Djakarta Bukan Hollywood (1954)
- Djakarta Diwaktu Malam (1954)
- Djula Djuli Bintang Tiga (1954)
- Kali Brantas (Melati Kali Brantas) (1954)
- Malu-Malu Kutjing (1954), as Surachman
- Senen Raja (1954), as Pak Wongso
- Gado-gado Djakarta (1955)
- Si Bongkok dari Borobudur (1955)
- Pegawai Negeri (1956)
- Gending Sriwidjaja (1958)
- Sepiring Nasi (1960)
- Petir Sepandjang Malam (1967)

=== Crew ===
- Tirtonadi (1950) – Cinematography
- Air Mata Pengantin (1952) – Scriptwriter, story, sound editor
- Musafir Kelana (1953) – Director
- Kali Brantas (Melati Kali Brantas) (1954) – Director, scriptwriter, and story
- Senen Raja (1954) – Director
- Biola (1957) – Director and scriptwriter
- Serodja (1958) – Scriptwriter
- Gending Sriwidjaja (1958) – Director, scriptwriter, and music
- Gadis Manis Dipinggir Djalan (1960) – Scriptwriter
- Minah Gadis Dusun (1966) – Director, scriptwriter, and story
- Terpesona (1966) – Director and scriptwriter
- Petir Sepandjang Malam (1967) – Director and scriptwriter

== Works cited ==
- Apa Siapa Orang Film Indonesia [What and Who: Film Figures in Indonesia] (in Indonesian). Jakarta: Indonesian Ministry of Information. 1999. OCLC 44427179.
- Biran, Misbach Yusa, ed. (1979). Apa Siapa Orang Film Indonesia 1926–1978 [What and Who: Film Figures in Indonesia, 1926–1978]. Sinematek Indonesia. OCLC 6655859.
- Biran, Misbach Yusa (2009). Sejarah Film 1900-1950: Bikin Film di Jawa [History of Film 1900-1950: Making Films in Java] (in Indonesian). Komunitas Bamboo working with the Jakarta Art Council. ISBN 978-979-3731-58-2.
- Imanjaya, Ekky (2006). A to Z about Indonesian Film (in Indonesian). Bandung: Mizan. ISBN 978-979-752-367-1.
- "S. Waldy: Seniman jang Berdjiwa Proletar" [S. Waldy: An Artist with a Proletarian Soul]. Doenia Film (in Indonesian). 1 April 1955. p. 7.
- "Waldemar Caerel Hunter". filmindonesia.or.id (in Indonesian). Konfiden Foundation. Archived from the original on 11 March 2014.
- "Zoebaida". filmindonesia.or.id (in Indonesian). Jakarta: Konfiden Foundation. Archived from the original on 2 December 2013.
