= Elly Yunara =

Indonesian actress and producer (1923–1992)

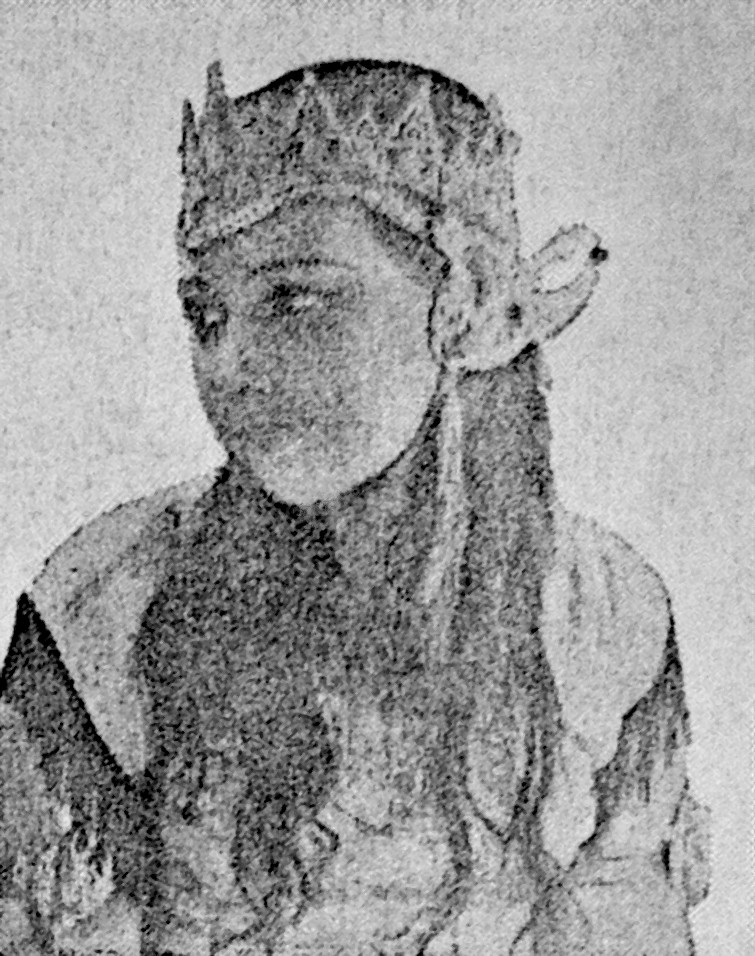
- Yunara in one of the scenes from Tjioeng Wanara (1941)
- Born: 3 November 1923; Straits Settlements
- Died: 30 May 1992 (aged 68); Jakarta, Indonesia
- Education: Elementary school
- Occupation(s): Actress, producer
- Years active: 1940–1980s
- Notable work: Pah Wongso Pendekar Boediman; Malin Kundang
- Spouse: Djamaluddin Malik

Elly Joenara (Perfected Spelling: Elly Yunara; 3 November 1923 – 30 May 1992) was an Indonesian film actress who later became a producer. She was the wife of producer Djamaluddin Malik.

== Biography ==
Joenara was born in Straits Settlements (modern-day Singapore) on 3 November 1923. She completed an elementary education at a Hollandsch-Inlandsche School, a Dutch-run school for pribumi students, the Dutch East Indies.

Joenara made her film debut in Pah Wongso Pendekar Boediman, a 1940 detective film produced and directed by Jo Eng Sek of Star Film. In the film she played Siti, the romantic partner of a character portrayed by Mohamad Arief. She remained with the company for its further productions, including Tjioeng Wanara (from a Sundanese legend), Lintah Darat, and Ajah Berdosa. By 1942 she is recorded as acting in one film produced by Tan's Film under Tan Khoen Yauw, Aladin dengan Lampu Wasiat (Aladdin and the Magic Lamp).

The Japanese occupied the Indies in March 1942, closing all but one film studio in the colony. Production of Aladin dengan Lampu Wasiat stopped; the film would only be released in 1950, after the occupation and national revolution. During the occupation Yunara acted in theatre, going from troupe to troupe; she was part of the troupes Warnasari, Matahari, and Jawa Ehai. By 1949, when the Dutch recognised an independent Indonesia, Yunara had married stage manager turned film producer Djamaluddin Malik.

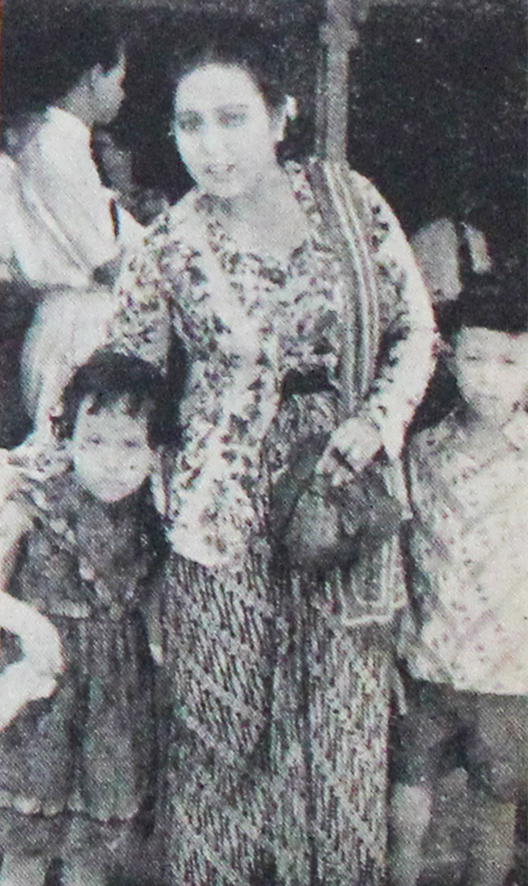
Yunara and two of her children, 1954

In 1950 Djamaluddin established a film company, Persari. Yunara completed two films for the company as an actress: Si Mientje in 1952 and Siapa Ajahku in 1954. However, her main role was managerial. Much of her time was spent as a housewife.

Djamaluddin died on 8 June 1970, leaving Yunara a widow. She soon established her own company, Remaja Ellyanda Film, and in 1972 began a career as a film producer with Malin Kundang. Directed by D. Djajakusuma and based on a Malay folk tale, the film starred Rano Karno and Putu Wijaya as the titular Malin Kundang, a young man who forgets his roots after spending much of his childhood at sea. This was followed by Jembatan Merah (1973), Petualang Cilik (1977), and Halimun (1979); the company also produced two non-feature films. In 1974 she received an award from Governor of Jakarta Ali Sadikin for her contributions to film.

Yunara died in Jakarta on 30 May 1992.

== Works cited ==
- "Aladin dengan Lampoe Wasiat". filmindonesia.or.id (in Indonesian). Jakarta: Konfiden Foundation. Archived from the original on 2 December 2013.
- Anwar, Rosihan, ed. (2002). In Memoriam: Mengenang yang Wafat [In Memoriam: Remembering Those Who Have Died] (in Indonesian). Jakarta: Kompas. ISBN 978-979-709-029-6.
- Apa Siapa Orang Film Indonesia [What and Who: Film Figures in Indonesia] (in Indonesian). Jakarta: Indonesian Ministry of Information. 1999. OCLC 44427179.
- Biran, Misbach Yusa, ed. (1979). Apa Siapa Orang Film Indonesia 1926–1978 [What and Who: Film Figures in Indonesia, 1926–1978] (in Indonesian). Sinematek Indonesia. OCLC 6655859.
- Biran, Misbach Yusa (2009). Sejarah Film 1900–1950: Bikin Film di Jawa [History of Film 1900–1950: Making Films in Java] (in Indonesian). Jakarta: Komunitas Bamboo working with the Jakarta Art Council. ISBN 978-979-3731-58-2.
- "Kredit Lengkap" [Full Credits]. Filmindonesia.or.id (in Indonesian). Konfidan Foundation. Archived from the original on 2 February 2014.
