= Taiyuan Asian Puppet Theatre Museum =

Museum in Datong, Taipei, Taiwan

- 台原亞洲偶戲博物館
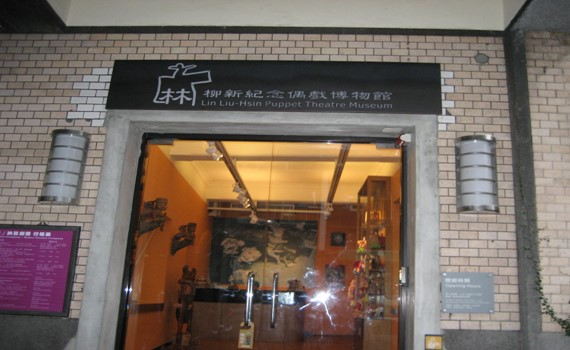
- Established: 2000 (TTT Puppet Centre); November 2005 (Lin Liu-hsin Puppet Theatre Museum)
- Location: Datong District, Taipei, Taiwan
- Coordinates: 25°03′21″N 121°30′33″E
- Type: museum
- Management: Robin Ruizendaal (director)

The Taiyuan Asian Puppet Theatre Museum (traditional Chinese: 台原亞洲偶戲博物館; simplified Chinese: 台原亚洲偶戏博物馆; pinyin: Táiyuán Yàzhōu Ôuxì Bówùguǎn) was a museum of puppet theatre in Datong District, Taipei, Taiwan. It aimed to preserve and promote traditional Asian puppet culture and to foster interaction between local and international puppet troupes.

== History ==
The museum was originally established in 2000 as the TTT Puppet Centre. It was then renamed as the Lin Liu-hsin Puppet Theatre Museum (Chinese: 林柳新紀念偶戲博物館; pinyin: Lín Liǔxīn Jìniàn Ǒuxì Bówùguǎn) in November 2005 before it was known as its current name. On 1 July 2019, the museum closed down.

== Exhibitions ==
It housed more than 10,000 puppet theater items from around the world, including glove, shadow, string and water puppets.

== Transportation ==
The museum was accessible within walking distance north of Beimen Station of Taipei Metro.

== See also ==
- List of museums in Taiwan
