= Bengawan Solo (1949 film) =

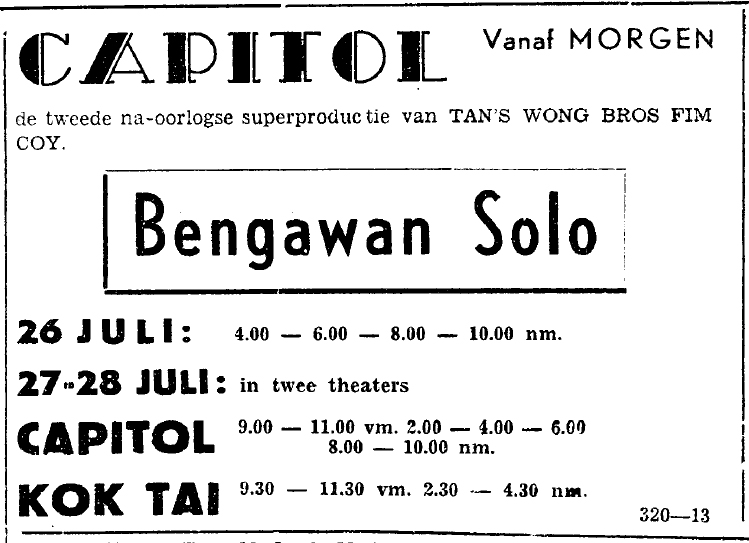
- Newspaper advertisement, Medan
- Directed by: Jo An Djan
- Written by: Tan Tjoei Hock; Fred Young
- Starring: Sofia WD; Rd Mochtar; Mohamad Mochtar
- Production companies: Tan & Wong Bros.
- Release date: 1949 (Dutch East Indies)
- Countries: Indonesia; Dutch East Indies
- Language: Indonesian

Bengawan Solo (Indonesian for Solo River) is a now-lost 1949 film from what is now Indonesia. Directed by Jo An Djan, it starred Sofia WD, Rd Mochtar, and Mohamad Mochtar.

== Plot ==
After falling for the false promises of the womanising nobleman Suprapto (Rd Mochtar), Wenangish (Sofia WD) commits suicide by throwing herself into the Solo River, leaving only a letter for her two children, Sriwulan (Ratna Ruthinah) and Hindrawati (Churiani). The former is raised by the family of nobleman Widagdo (Rd Dadang Ismail), while the latter is raised by a poor man named Kromo (S Waldy), eventually becoming a servant at Widagdo's home. When they are adults, Sriwulan is engaged by her adoptive father to Suprapto's son, despite loving another man. When her hitherto unknown uncle, Prawoto (Mohamad Mochtar), returns from his job in Borneo, he prevents the two from marrying, instead showing that they were both fathered by Suprapto. The marriage is cancelled, and Suprapto – seeing a vision of Wenangish, beckoning him – commits suicide by jumping into the river.

== Production ==
Bengawan Solo was directed by Jo An Djan for Tan & Wong Bros., a company established by the Tan brothers, Khoen Yauw and Khoen Hian, and Wong brothers, Joshua and Othniel, in 1948. Jo had been a director for Populer Films before the Japanese occupation essentially shut down film production. The story was written by Tan Tjoei Hock and Fred Young. Indonesian film historian Misbach Yusa Biran writes that the film was meant to draw as many tears as possible, using a formula reminiscent of most domestic productions since Terang Boelan in 1937: action, love, music, and beautiful scenery.

The black-and-white film starred Sofia WD, Rd Mochtar, Mohamad Mochtar, Dadang Ismail, S Waldy, Ratna Ruthinah, Churiani, Sukarsih, Sadijah, and Komariah. The film's theme song was the 1940 composition by Gesang Martohartono of the same name, "Bengawan Solo".

== Release ==
Bengawan Solo was released by July 1949, one of eight domestic films produced that year. The film is likely lost, as are all Indonesian films from before 1950 according to American visual anthropologist Karl G. Heider. However, JB Kristanto's Katalog Film Indonesia (Indonesian Film Catalogue) records several as having survived at Sinematek Indonesia's archives, and film historian Misbach Yusa Biran writes that several Japanese propaganda films have survived at the Netherlands Government Information Service.

Two years later Young wrote another film regarding the Solo River, Ditepi Bengawan Solo. This work had a different plot and different cast. Bengawan Solo was remade in 1971, with Sofia WD, Willy Wilianto (Joshua Wong's son), and Bay Isbahi directing. In this remake, Wenangish (played by Rima Melati) died after being hit by a train.

== Works cited ==
- Abdullah, Taufik; Biran, Misbach Yusa; Ardan, S M (1993). Film Indonesia (in Indonesian). National Film Board. OCLC 32134625.
- "Bengawan Solo". filmindonesia.or.id (in Indonesian). Jakarta: Konfiden Foundation. Archived from the original on 31 October 2013.
- "Bengawan Solo (1971)". filmindonesia.or.id (in Indonesian). Jakarta: Konfiden Foundation. Archived from the original on 20 February 2015.
- Biran, Misbach Yusa (2009). Sejarah Film 1900–1950: Bikin Film di Jawa [History of Film 1900–1950: Making Films in Java] (in Indonesian). Jakarta: Komunitas Bamboo working with the Jakarta Art Council. ISBN 978-979-3731-58-2.
- "Ditepi Bengawan Solo". filmindonesia.or.id (in Indonesian). Jakarta: Konfiden Foundation. Archived from the original on 20 February 2015.
- Heider, Karl G (1991). Indonesian Cinema: National Culture on Screen. Honolulu: University of Hawaii Press. ISBN 978-0-8248-1367-3.
- "(untitled)". Het Nieuwsblad voor Sumatra (in Dutch). 25 July 1949. p. 4.
