= List of lost films =

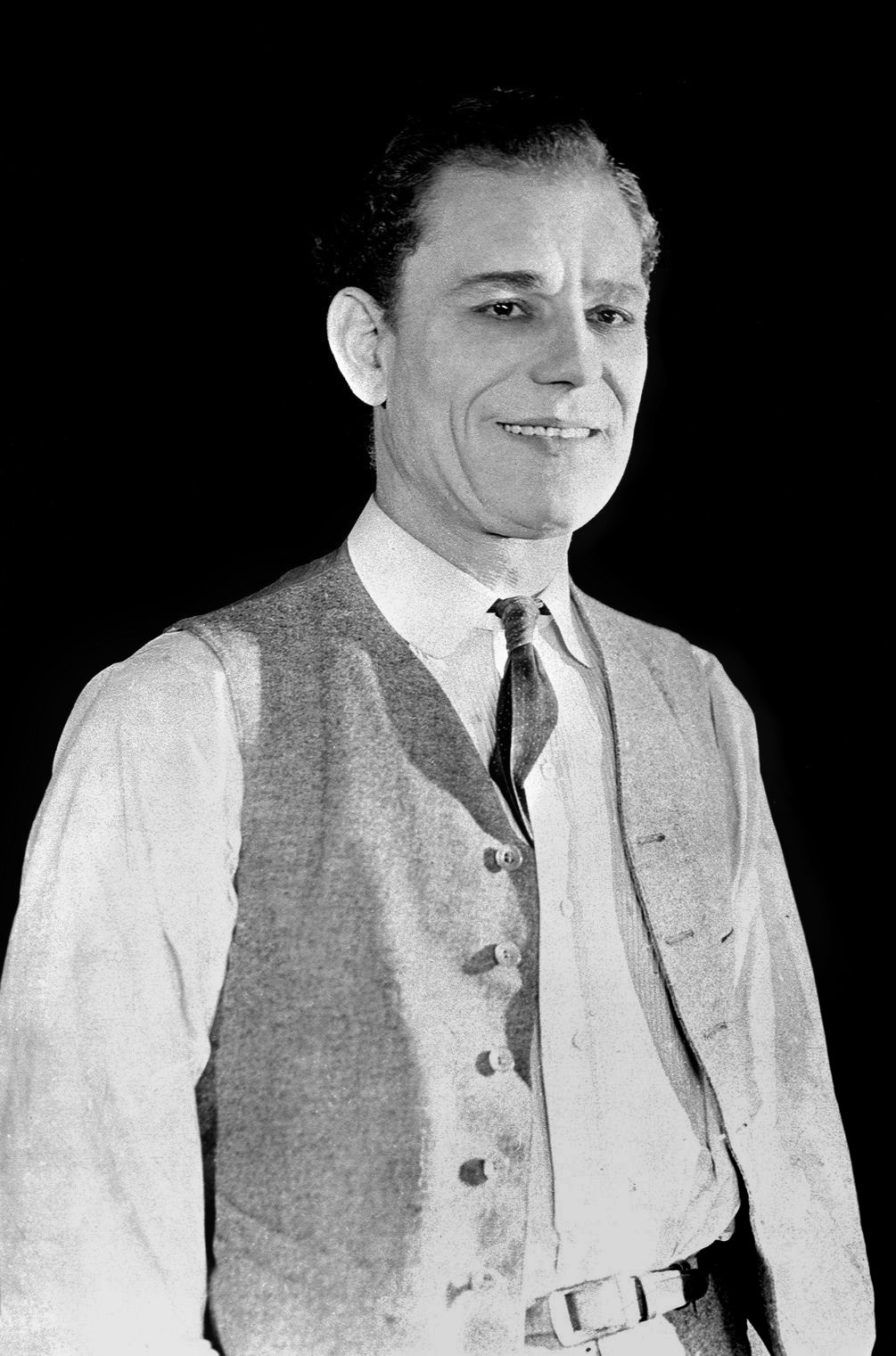
Lon Chaney appeared in numerous now-lost films. This still is from The Miracle Man (1919), a mostly lost film.

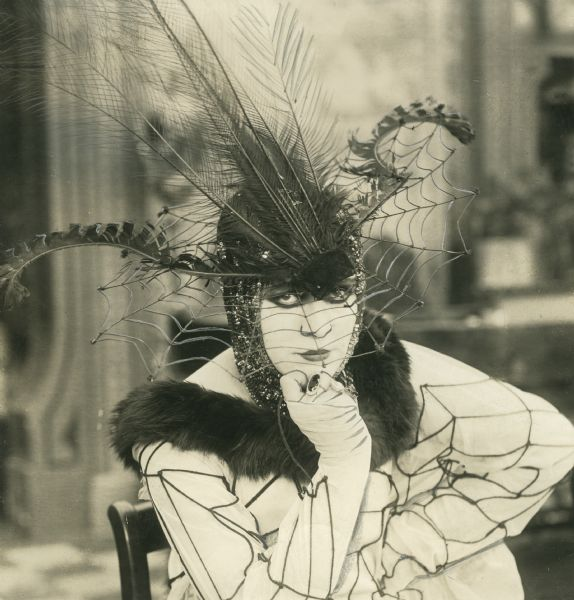
At one time a popular player at Fox, all of Valeska Suratt's Fox films are lost.

For this list of lost films, a lost film is defined as one of which no part of a print is known to have survived. For films in which any portion of the footage remains (including trailers), see List of incomplete or partially lost films.

== Reasons for loss ==
Films may go missing for a number of reasons. One major contributing factor is the common use of nitrate film until the early 1950s. This type of film is highly flammable, and there have been several devastating fires, such as the 1914 Lubin vault fire, the Universal Pictures fire in 1924, the Warner Bros. First National fire in 1933, the British and Dominions Imperial Studios fire in 1936, the 1937 Fox vault fire, and the 1965 MGM vault fire.

Black-and-white film prints judged to be otherwise worthless were sometimes incinerated to salvage the meager scrap value of the silver image particles in their emulsions. Silent films in particular were once seen as having no further commercial value and were simply junked to clear out expensive storage space. Occasionally, a studio would remake a film and destroy the earlier version. Films have also disappeared when production companies went bankrupt.

== Statistics on lost films ==
Martin Scorsese's Film Foundation claimed in 2017 that "half of all American films made before 1950 and over 90% of films made before 1929 are lost forever". Deutsche Kinemathek estimates that 80–90% of silent films are gone; the film archive's own list contains over 3,500 lost films.

A study by the Library of Congress of 2013 states that 75% of American feature-length silent films are lost. While others dispute whether the percentage is quite that high, it is impractical to enumerate here any but the more notable and those which can be sourced.

Roughly 200 out of over 500 Méliès films and 350 out of over 1,000 of Alice Guy's films survive. Of the roughly 1,100 films made in India between 1912 and 1931, only 29 are known to have survived.

As of 16 August 2006, The Image of the Journalist in Popular Culture, a project of the Norman Lear Center at the USC Annenberg School for Communication & Journalism has not found an existing copy of 429 films.

== Notable lost films ==
Among the films commonly mourned among critics and film historians are early films by noted directors and films of unique cultural importance. The Mountain Eagle (1926) is the second film directed by Alfred Hitchcock; the silent melodrama has been described by the British Film Institute as their "most wanted" lost film. London After Midnight, starring Lon Chaney and directed by Tod Browning in 1927, was a silent-era mystery-thriller pseudo-vampire film that is now considered to be the "holy grail" of lost films by collectors. Hollywood, a 1923 silent comedy film directed by James Cruze, featured over 30 cameo appearances from major stars of the day, including Roscoe "Fatty" Arbuckle, Charlie Chaplin, Mary Astor and Pola Negri, but no footage exists.

== Silent films ==
=== 1890s ===
Year	Film	Director	Cast	Notes	Ref
1895	Young Griffo vs. Battling Charles Barnett	Otway Latham	Young Griffo, Charles Barnett	First American film shown to a paying audience	
1896	Arrivée d'un train gare de Vincennes	Georges Méliès		A French short documentary	
1896	L'Arroseur (a.k.a. Watering the Flowers)	Georges Méliès		A short comedy	
1896	Barque sortant du port de Trouville	Georges Méliès			
1896	Bateau-mouche sur la Seine	Georges Méliès			
1896	Bébé et fillettes	Georges Méliès		A short documentary	
1896	Les Blanchisseuses	Georges Méliès		A short documentary	
1896	Bois de Boulogne (Porte de Madrid)	Georges Méliès		A short documentary	
1896	Bois de Boulogne (Touring Club)	Georges Méliès		A short documentary	
1896	Boulevard des Italiens	Georges Méliès		A short documentary	
1896	Campement de bohémiens (The Bohemian Encampment)	Georges Méliès		A short documentary	
1896	Les chevaux de bois	Georges Méliès			
1896	Le chiffonnier (The Rag-Picker)	Georges Méliès			
1896	Couronnement de la rosière	Georges Méliès			
1896	Déchargement de bateaux	Georges Méliès			
1896	Jardinier brûlant des herbes	Georges Méliès			
1896	Jetée et Plage de Trouville (first and second parts)	Georges Méliès			
1896	Jour de marché à Trouville	Georges Méliès			
1896	Gestoorde hengelaar	M.H. Laddé	Lion Solser, Piet Hesse	The first Dutch fictional film	
1896	La Fée aux Choux	Alice Guy Blache		The first narrative film directed by a woman	
1896	Spelende kinderen	M.H. Laddé			
1896	Zwemplaats voor Jongelingen te Amsterdam	M.H. Laddé			
1898	Ten Years in Manitoba	James Freer		Documentary film. First film known to have been directed by a Canadian.	

=== 1900s ===
Year	Film	Director	Cast	Notes	Ref
1900	Soldiers of the Cross	Joseph Perry		Early Australian film, produced by the Limelight Department of the Salvation Army. It was a multimedia production which combined 200 lantern slides with 13–20 film reels of about 2 minutes each, a live oration and live orchestra. None of the film reels survive.	
1900	Solser en Hesse	M.H. Laddé	Lion Solser, Piet Hesse	The first film with this title, featuring the Dutch comedians Lion Solser and Piet Hesse	
1902	The Adventures of the Cabman	Kazimierz Prószyński		The first Polish fiction film	
1903	Hiawatha, the Messiah of the Ojibway	Joe Rosenthal		Believed to be the first Canadian fiction film	
1906	Solser en Hesse	M.H. Laddé	Lion Solser, Piet Hesse	The second film with this title, featuring the Dutch comedians Lion Solser and Piet Hesse	
1907	Salaviinanpolttajat	Louis Sparre, Teuvo Puro	Teppo Raikas, Teuvo Puro, Jussi Snellman, Eero Kilpi, Axel Rautio	The first Finnish fiction film. Some sources also consider it to be the first Russian fiction film, as Finland was a part of the Russian Empire until 1917.	
1908	A Christmas Carol		Tom Ricketts	The first American film adaptation of Charles Dickens' famous 1843 novella of the same name.	
1908	Barcarola	Júlio Ferrez	Antônio Cataldi	A short Brazilian film based on The Tales of Hoffmann, an 1881 opéra fantastique composed by Jacques Offenbach. Following its premiere in Rio de Janeiro, the short was screened on eight known occasions between 1908 and 1909 in Rio Branco.	
1908	The Fairylogue and Radio-Plays	Francis Boggs, Otis Turner	L. Frank Baum, Romola Remus	First adaptation of The Wonderful Wizard of Oz and several of its sequels. Shown only in roadshow engagements as part of a live theater presentation, the print decomposed and was discarded.	
1908	La Tosca	André Calmettes	Sarah Bernhardt, Pierre Berton, Félicia Mallet	The second film starring Bernhardt, the best known stage actress of the 1880s–1900s. Based on the play by Victorien Sardou that was adapted into an opera by Giacomo Puccini.	
1909	In the Sultan's Power	Francis Boggs	Hobart Bosworth, Stella Adams, Betty Harte, Tom Santschi, Frank Montgomery, E. Vivian, Robert Z. Leonard	The production was shot in a vacant lot next to a Chinese laundry located at Seventh and Olive Streets in Los Angeles, California.	

== Sound films ==
From 1929 on, films are "all-talking" unless otherwise specified.

=== 1920s ===
Year	Film	Director	Cast	Notes	Ref.
1928	4 Devils	F.W. Murnau	Janet Gaynor	Fox Studios' print was reportedly borrowed by actress Mary Duncan, who played a supporting role in the film, but its whereabouts are now unknown.	
1928	Conquest	Roy Del Ruth	Monte Blue	Warner Bros.' fifth all-talking feature	
1928	Gang War	Bert Glennon	Jack Pickford	Released with the Mickey Mouse short Steamboat Willie, the film was a failure and became lost.	
1928	Heart Trouble	Harry Langdon	Harry Langdon	Langdon's last silent feature received little promotion in the United States, with fewer than 100 prints struck. There were reported showings in Australia in 1931.	
1928	The Actress	Sidney Franklin	Norma Shearer	The film was based on the 1898 play "Trelawny of the Wells".	
1928	The Home Towners	Bryan Foy	Doris Kenyon, Richard Bennett	Warner Bros.' third all-talking feature	
1928	Melody of Love	Arch Heath	Walter Pidgeon, Mildred Harris	Universal's first sound feature	
1928	On Trial	Archie Mayo	Pauline Frederick, Lois Wilson, Bert Lytell	Warner Bros.' fourth all-talking feature	
1928	Tenderloin	Michael Curtiz	Dolores Costello, Conrad Nagel	Second feature film to have synchronized dialogue sequences, part-talkie	
1928	The Terror	Roy Del Ruth	May McAvoy, Alec B. Francis, Edward Everett Horton, Louise Fazenda.	Warner Bros.' second all-talking feature	
1928	Women They Talk About	Lloyd Bacon	Irene Rich	A part-talkie released by Warner Bros.	
1929	The Argyle Case	Howard Bretherton	Thomas Meighan, H. B. Warner, Lila Lee, Gladys Brockwell	Silent veteran Brockwell died in a traffic accident shortly after making this film.	
1929	The Aviator	Roy Del Ruth	Edward Everett Horton, Patsy Ruth Miller		
1929	The Awful Truth	Marshall Neilan	Ina Claire		
1929	College Love	Nat Ross	George J. Lewis, Eddie Phillips		
1929	Dark Streets	Frank Lloyd	Jack Mulhall, Lila Lee	Jack Mulhall's character is the first attempt at dual role double exposure photography in a talking film.	
1929	Evidence	John G. Adolfi	Pauline Frederick, Conway Tearle		
1929	Fancy Baggage	John G. Adolfi	Audrey Ferris, Myrna Loy	A part-talkie from Warner Bros.	
1929	Footlights and Fools	William A. Seiter	Colleen Moore	Part-Technicolor.	
1929	The Forward Pass	Edward F. Cline	Douglas Fairbanks Jr., Loretta Young		
1929	Frozen Justice	Allan Dwan	Lenore Ulric		
1929	The Gamblers	Michael Curtiz	H. B. Warner, Lois Wilson		
1929	Hearts in Exile	Michael Curtiz	Dolores Costello, Grant Withers		
1929	Honky Tonk	Lloyd Bacon	Sophie Tucker, Lila Lee	This was Tucker's film debut. The complete soundtrack survives.	
1929	The Hottentot	Roy Del Ruth	Edward Everett Horton, Patsy Ruth Miller		
1929	Is Everybody Happy?	Archie Mayo	Ted Lewis, Ann Pennington		
1929	Jealousy	Jean de Limur	Jeanne Eagels, Fredric March		
1929	Love, Live and Laugh	William K. Howard	George Jessel, Lila Lee		
1929	The Love Racket	William A. Seiter	Dorothy Mackaill, Sidney Blackmer		
1929	Lucky in Love	Kenneth S. Webb	Morton Downey, Betty Lawford		
1929	Madonna of Avenue A	Michael Curtiz	Dolores Costello, Grant Withers		
1929	Melody Lane	Robert F. Hill	Eddie Leonard, Josephine Dunn	Universal's first fully talking musical	
1929	The Painted Angel	Millard Webb	Billie Dove, Edmund Lowe		
1929	Paris	Clarence G. Badger	Irene Bordoni, Jack Buchanan	Technicolor sequences.	
1929	Queen of the Night Clubs	Bryan Foy	Texas Guinan, Lila Lee		
1929	Red Hot Rhythm	Leo McCarey	Alan Hale, Kathryn Crawford	Multicolor sequences.	
1929	The Sacred Flame	Archie Mayo	Pauline Frederick, Conrad Nagel		
1929	Skin Deep	Ray Enright	Monte Blue, Betty Compson		
1929	Smiling Irish Eyes	William A. Seiter	Colleen Moore	Part-Technicolor.	
1929	A Song of Kentucky	Lewis Seiler	Lois Moran, Joseph Wagstaff		
1929	South Sea Rose	Allan Dwan	Lenore Ulric, Charles Bickford		
1929	Speakeasy	Benjamin Stoloff	Paul Page, Lola Lane		
1929	Stark Mad	Lloyd Bacon	Louise Fazenda, H. B. Warner	Released in both silent and all-talking version; both are lost. However Vitaphone disc soundtracks of both the trailer and excerpts of the film were spotted in UCLA's Archive in October 2023 by Ray Langstone.	
1929	The Time, the Place and the Girl	Howard Bretherton	Grant Withers, Betty Compson		
1929	The Burning of the Red Lotus Temple	Zhang Shichuan	Hu Die	The film ran for 27 hours total.	

=== 1930s ===
Year	Film	Director	Cast	Notes	Ref.
1930	An Elastic Affair	Alfred Hitchcock		Short film made by Hitchcock for an awards ceremony at the London Palladium in January 1930	
1930	The Big Party	John G. Blystone	Sue Carol, Dixie Lee		
1930	Cock o' the Walk	Walter Lang	Joseph Schildkraut, Myrna Loy		
1930	The Cave of the Silken Web II	Dan Duyu	Yin Mingzhu	Silent. Chinese film. Original title: 续盘丝洞 (Xù pán xī dong). Sequel to the 1927 The Cave of the Silken Web (which itself had been thought to have been lost, but was rediscovered in 2013)	
1930	College Lovers	John G. Adolfi	Marion Nixon, Jack Whiting	Musical comedy. Six Vitaphone discs containing elements of the soundtrack are held at UCLA and were discovered in October 2023.	
1930	Fellers	Austin Fay, Arthur Higgins	Arthur Tauchert, Les Coney	An Australian comedy	
1930	Hold Everything	Roy Del Ruth	Joe E. Brown, Winnie Lightner	All-technicolor musical comedy film. Sound discs exist.	
1930	Kismet	John Francis Dillon	Otis Skinner, Loretta Young	A lavish costume drama in the early widescreen process known as Vitascope. The complete soundtrack exists on Vitaphone discs.	
1930	Let's Go Places	Frank R. Strayer	Frank Richardson, Dixie Lee		
1930	Lord Richard in the Pantry	Walter Forde	Richard Cooper, Dorothy Seacombe	Included on the British Film Institute's "75 Most Wanted" list of lost British feature films	
1930	Murder Will Out	Clarence C. Badger	Jack Mulhall, Lila Lee, Noah Beery	Another early lost sound film from Warner Bros.	
1930	Noli Me Tángere	Jose Nepumuceno		The 1930 version of Noli Me Tángere was directed by Jose Nepumuceno based on the novel written by Dr. Jose Rizal with a synchronized soundtrack.	
1930	One Mad Kiss	Marcel Silver	José Mojica, Antonio Moreno		
1930	Song of the Flame	Alan Crosland	Bernice Claire, Noah Beery	All-Technicolor musical drama, the first color film featuring widescreen, and Academy Award nominee for Best Sound. Sound discs for five of the nine reels exist.	
1931	Alam Ara	Ardeshir Irani	Master Vithal, Zubeida, Jilloo, J. Sushila, Prithviraj Kapoor	The first Indian sound film	
1931	Deadlock	George King	Stewart Rome, Marjorie Hume, Warwick Ward	On the BFI 75 Most Wanted list of lost films	
1931	Hobson's Choice	Thomas Bentley	James Harcourt, Viola Lyel, Frank Pettingell	On the BFI 75 Most Wanted list of lost films	
1931	Kalidas	H. M. Reddy	T. P. Rajalakshmi, P. G. Venkatesan, L. V. Prasad	First sound film in Telugu cinema, Tamil cinema, as well as in South Indian cinema	
1931	Peludópolis	Quirino Cristiani		Argentine production; the world's first animated feature film with sound, using a primitive sound-on-disc system	
1931	The Bells	Harcourt Templeman	Donald Calthrop, Jane Welsh, Edward Sinclair, O.B. Clarence, Wilfred Shine, Ralph Truman, Anita Sharp-Bolster	The film was originally released with a film score written by Gustav Holst, the only film score by Holst.	
1931	Two Crowded Hours	Michael Powell	John Longden, Jane Welsh, Jerry Verno	Powell's directorial debut	
1932	Charlie Chan's Chance	John G. Blystone	Warner Oland	Sixth film of the Charlie Chan series and third with Warner Oland	
1932	Men of Tomorrow	Zoltan Korda, Leontine Sagan	Maurice Braddell, Joan Gardner	Robert Donat's film debut; on the BFI 75 Most Wanted list of lost films	
1932	The Night of Decision	Dimitri Buchowetzki	Conrad Veidt, Olga Chekhova, Peter Voß		
1932	The Missing Rembrandt	Leslie S. Hiscott	Arthur Wontner	Second film in the Sherlock Holmes series	
1932	Speed Demon	D. Ross Lederman	William Collier Jr.		
1933	Chikara to Onna no Yo no Naka	Kenzō Masaoka		First sound anime	
1933	Ang Aswang	George Mauser	Celia Xerxes Burgos, Luis Ayesa, Arturo Sawanson	The first ever Filipino talkie film and an early example of horror genre movies based on Philippine mythology, featuring a creature called Aswang or a Ghoul. The film opened to acclaim at the Lyric on January 1, 1933, then at the Tivoli on January 4. Unfortunately, according to some observers, the sound was sometimes out of sync and inaudible.	
1933	The Big Brain	George Archainbaud	George E. Stone; Phillips Holmes; Fay Wray		
1933	Convention City	Archie Mayo	Joan Blondell; Dick Powell; Adolphe Menjou; Mary Astor	A pre-Code film produced by Warner Bros.-First National	
1933	Hotel Variety	Raymond Cannon	Hal Skelly; Olive Borden; Charlotte Walker		
1933	Night in the City	Fei Mu	Ruan Lingyu; Jin Yan	Fei Mu's debut	
1933	Racetrack	James Cruze	Leo Carrillo; Junior Coughlan; Kay Hammond		
1933	Two Minutes Silence	Paulette McDonagh	Frank Bradley, Campbell Copelin, Marie Lorraine	Australia's first anti-war movie	
1933	Wasei Kingu Kongu	Torajiro Saito	Isamu Yamaguchi	Japanese short film based on King Kong	
1934	Jail Birds of Paradise	Al Boasberg	Dorothy Appleby, Moe Howard, Curly Howard	The only lost Three Stooges film	
1934	Murder at Monte Carlo	Ralph Ince	Errol Flynn	Flynn's debut film in the UK	
1934	Ragazzo	Ivo Perilli	Costantino Frasca, Isa Pola, Osvaldo Valenti	Screening was banned by Fascist authorities before the premiere, and the film was subsequently stored at the Centro Sperimentale di Cinematografia. During the Germans' retreat in 1944, the center was looted and set on fire.	
1934	The Scarab Murder Case	Michael Hankinson	Wilfrid Hyde-White	A Philo Vance film	
1935	The Magic Shoes	Claude Flemming	Peter Finch	Completed, but never released	
1935	Obeah!	F. Herrick Herrick	Jean Brooks, Phillips Lord	Released in February 1935	
1936	The Oregon Trail	Scott Pembroke	John Wayne	Stills were found in 2013	
1936	The Adventures of Pinocchio	Raoul Verdini, Umberto Spano		Unfinished film intended to be the first animated feature film from Italy. Only the original script and a couple of still frames survive.	
1937	Terang Boelan	Albert Balink	Rd. Mochtar, Roekiah	Romance film from the Dutch East Indies; the colony's biggest commercial success	
1938	The King Kong That Appeared in Edo	Sōya Kumagai	Eizaburo Matsumoto	Likely lost during World War II	
1938	Nad Niemnem	Wanda Jakubowska and Karol Szolowski		The Nazi regime liked the artistic value of the movie, but could not allow the screening of a picture so firmly rooted in Polish history. It was dubbed and re-edited, changing it to pro-German propaganda. Stefan Dekierowski informed the Polish underground, and the remaining three copies (out of five total) were hidden in winter 1939; the movie is believed to be lost.	
1939	The Good Old Days	Roy William Neill	Max Miller, Hal Walters, Kathleen Gibson	On the BFI 75 Most Wanted list of lost films	
1939	Secreto de confesión			Lost during the bombing of Manila during World War II	

=== 1940s ===
Year	Film	Director	Cast	Notes	Ref.
1940	Harta Berdarah	R Hu, Rd Ariffien	Zonder, Soelastri	Indonesian action film. Screened until at least July 1944	
1940	Kedok Ketawa	Jo An Djan	Fatimah, Basoeki Resobowo, Oedjang	Union Films' first production. Screened until at least August 1944	
1941	Asmara Moerni	Rd Ariffien	Adnan Kapau Gani, Djoewariah, S. Joesoef	Indonesian romance film. Screened until at least November 1945	
1941	Bajar dengan Djiwa	R Hu	A Bakar, Djoewariah, O Parma, Oedjang, RS Fatimah, Soelastri, Zonder	Indonesian drama film. Screened until at least October 1943	
1941	Soeara Berbisa	R Hu	Raden Soekarno, Ratna Djoewita, Oedjang, Soehaena	Screened until at least February 1949, longer than any other Union Films production, and the only Union picture known to have been shown post-World War II	
1941	Wanita dan Satria	Rd Ariffien	Djoewariah, Ratna Djoewita, Hidajat, Z. Algadrie, Moesa		
1941	Mega Mendoeng	Boen Kim Nam	Raden Soekarno, Oedjang, Boen Sofiati, Soehaena	Union Films' final production before the studio closed ahead of the impending Japanese occupation	
1942	The Battle of Hong Kong	Shigeo Tanaka	Ichirô Izawa, Kiyo Kuroda, Yasushi Nagata, Jun Usami, Masao Wakahara	Produced by the Japanese Dai Nippon Film Company during the Japanese occupation of Hong Kong	
1943	Squadron Leader X	Lance Comfort	Eric Portman, Ann Dvorak	On the BFI 75 Most Wanted list of lost films	
1944	Red Sky at Morning	Hartney Arthur	Peter Finch, John Alden		
1945	Flight from Folly	Herbert Mason	Patricia Kirkwood, Hugh Sinclair	Screen debut of stage star Kirkwood. On the BFI 75 Most Wanted list of lost films	
1945	We Accuse	Joseph H. Zarovich	Everett Sloane, narr.	One of the first feature-length American Holocaust documentaries released after Liberation, with narration scripted by John Bright, screenwriter for The Public Enemy (1931) and She Done Him Wrong (1933)	
1948	The Betrayal	Oscar Micheaux		The director's final production	

=== 1950s ===
1959	Street Fighter	Joseph Sargent	Vic Savage	B-movie/teensploitation film; director's debut feature film

=== 1960s ===
Year	Film	Director	Cast	Notes	Ref.
1960	The Burning Skies	Leslie Norman	Yvonne Romain, John Longden	A little known horror film of modest repute about the sun overheating the earth. One of Longden's last films as the leading man.	
1962	Bulgasari	Kim Myeong-je	Choi Moo-ryong, Um Aing-ran	Believed to be the first South Korean monster film, as well as the first to use special effects. The film is one of the most sought-after lost films in the kaiju genre.	
1962	The Weird Ones	Pat Boyette			
1963	Andy Warhol Films: Jack Smith Filming Normal Love	Andy Warhol	Jack Smith	This home movie, which may have been Warhol's first film, was seized by the New York City police in March 1964 and has since disappeared.	
1963	Farewell Performance	Robert Tronson	David Kernan, Frederick Jaeger, Delphi Lawrence	On the BFI 75 Most Wanted list of lost films. Two excerpts from one reel of footage were posted on YouTube by a private collector in January 2024 and confirmed to be from the film by members of the Joe Meek Society and lost TV/film enthusiast Ray Langstone.	
1966	Gogola	Balwant Dave		An Indian Hindi-language monster film. Following in the vein of such Japanese kaiju films as those in the Godzilla series, the plot of Gogola concerns a giant creature that emerges from the sea to terrorize Mumbai. Posters, lobby cards featuring promotional stills, and its soundtrack have survived.	
1967	Batman Fights Dracula	Leody M. Diaz	Jing Abalos, Dante Rivero	A Filipino parody made without the permission of DC Comics, which owns the copyright for the character of Batman	
1969	Boys	Arthur J. Bressan Jr.		One of Bressan's first films, this gay adult production is identified as a lost film by the co-hosts of the podcast Ask Any Buddy.	

=== 1970s ===
Year	Film	Director	Cast	Notes	Ref.
1972	Lash of Lust	George Sheaffer	Gary Kent, Bambi Allen, Rene Bond, George Buck Flower	Filmed in 1969 on the Spahn Ranch while the Manson Family was in residence and shortly before the commission of the Tate-LaBianca Murders.	
1972	Midnight Geisha Boy	Dick Martin	Mark Richards, Ken Hill, Sammy Bond, Garth Lennox, Ray Revel	All copies of this gay-themed adult film were confiscated in a raid of Jaguar Productions' office by the Federal Bureau of Investigation. Apart from a trailer, no known film elements have survived.	
1972	Nobody Ordered Love	Robert Hartford-Davis	Ingrid Pitt, Tony Selby	All known prints believed destroyed upon the director's death at his request. On the BFI 75 Most Wanted list of lost films	
1973	Prem Parbat	Ved Rahi	Satish Kaul, Hema Malini	According to the film's director, the print of the film has long since degraded to the point of being unusable.	
1973	Romusha	Herman Nagara	Rofi'ie Prabancana, A. Hamid Arief	This film about Japanese war crimes in occupied Indonesia was destroyed just before its release by the period regime, following a protest from the Japanese embassy.	
1974	Every Nigger Is a Star	Calvin Lockhart	Calvin Lockhart, Alfred Fagon	Lost film about a man's journey to return to his home of Jamaica, where he meets famous reggae bands of the time, including Inner Circle. However, the soundtrack has survived, and has gained mainstream attention due to the title track being sampled on rapper Kendrick Lamar's album To Pimp a Butterfly and for being featured in the 2016 film Moonlight.	
1974	Him	Ed D. Louie	Tava	Gay pornographic film about a man who develops an erotic fixation with the life of Jesus Christ. Has been erroneously described as a hoax.	
1975	Levi & Leather	Mother Goose		Also known as Levi's N' Leather. A fetish-themed gay pornographic film that premiered over Thanksgiving weekend of 1975 in San Francisco, on a double bill with the Roger Earl film Born to Raise Hell. The podcast Ask Any Buddy notes that it is a lost film.	
1977	Kissa Kursi Ka	Amrit Nahata	Shabana Azmi, Utpal Dutt	The plot revolved around a corrupt and evil politician Gangaram or Gangu, played by Manohar Singh, trying to woo personified public, depicted as mute and helpless looking (Shabana Azmi). The film was a satire on the politics of Indira Gandhi and her son Sanjay Gandhi and was banned by the Indian Government during the Emergency period and all prints were confiscated. Subsequently, all the prints and the master-print of the film at Censor Board office were picked up, later brought to Maruti factory in Gurgaon, where they were burned	
1978	Tadhana	Nonoy Marcelo	Pandy Aviado, Estrella Kuenzler	A first-ever Philippine feature-length animated film presents a satirical, humorous and poignant view of the Philippines' history of Spanish colonisation through highly original and surreal vignettes fusing art, mythology and music. During the premiere, the original 35mm film reel mysteriously disappeared but only a few copies surrounding elsewhere in the Philippines, particularly Teddy Co. and Mowelfund Film Institute.	
1979	Looking for the Amazons	Rita Moreira and Norma Bahia Pontes		Only some excerpts had survived by 2020 because Moreira had self-admittedly disposed of her only copy due to having "too much lines".	
1979	Njattadi	Bharath Gopi	Bharat Murali, K.N. Sreenivasan, Sunil, Girija and Kalamandalam Devaki	The film is based on the life of the protagonist Unni, who is moved by Naxalite ideas. It was banned by the censor board because of the portrayal of Naxal ideas. The film was screened only twice and its print is now lost.	
1970s	Just another crime, next door this time	Rita Moreira and Norma Bahia Pontes		Part of the duo's Living in New York City series; no print could be found in 2020.	
1970s	The Kid at Times Square and the Bird on Broadway	Rita Moreira and Norma Bahia Pontes		Part of the duo's Living in New York City series; no print could be found in 2020.	

=== 1980s ===
Year	Film	Director	Cast	Notes	Ref.
1982	Milagro sa Porta Vaga	Florencio Orbeta	Julie Vega	Religious epic film about Our Lady of Porta Vaga, a venerated Marian icon in the Philippines. No known print of the film was found aside from a lone still.	
1983–1985	P.P. The Planetary Pal	Paul Sammon	Steve Bailey, Nanci Hunter, and Sally Marsh	Feature length parody film of E.T. the Extra-Terrestrial, was fully filmed and completed but never released.	
1988	A Cor da Terra	Norma Bahia Pontes and Ana Porto		No print could be found in 2020.	

== Lost music videos ==
Year	Artist	Title	Notes	Ref.
1984	Azyl P.	Mała Maggie	Video recorded in Warsaw, tapes were deleted by Telewizja Polska.	

== See also ==
- Lost television broadcast
- List of Lost episodes
