= List of Dutch films before 1910 =

This is a list of films produced in the Netherlands before 1910. The films are produced in the Dutch language.

== 1896-1899 ==
Title	Director	Cast	Genre	Notes
1896
Gestoorde hengelaar	M.H. Laddé	Lion Solser; Piet Hesse	Comedy	Studio: Eerst Nederlandsch Atelier tot het vervaardigen van Films voor de Bioscoop en Cinematograaf M.H. Laddé & J.W. Merkelbach. First Dutch silent film. The film is lost
Spelende kinderen	M.H. Laddé		Docufilm	Studio: Eerst Nederlandsch Atelier tot het vervaardigen van Films voor de Bioscoop en Cinematograaf M.H. Laddé & J.W. Merkelbach. The film is lost
Zwemplaats voor Jongelingen te Amsterdam	M.H. Laddé		Docufilm	Studio: Eerst Nederlandsch Atelier tot het vervaardigen van Films voor de Bioscoop en Cinematograaf M.H. Laddé & J.W. Merkelbach. The film is lost
1897
De Brandweer-film te Delft	Alex van Dijck		Docufilm	The film is lost
Reclamefilm voor de Delftsche sla-oliefabriek	Alex van Dijck		Docufilm	The film is lost
1898
Inhuldiging Koningin Wilhelmina te Amsterdam			Docufilm	Film extant
1899
Aankomst en vertrek spoortrein te Weesp			Docufilm	Studio: Eerst Nederlandsch Atelier tot het vervaardigen van Films voor de Bioscoop en Cinematograaf M.H. Laddé & J.W. Merkelbach. The film is lost
De militaire wedstrijden door het 7e regiment. Oranje-Nassau Kazerne op 25 Oct.			Docufilm	Studio: Eerst Nederlandsch Atelier tot het vervaardigen van Films voor de Bioscoop en Cinematograaf M.H. Laddé & J.W. Merkelbach. The film is lost

== 1900-1909 ==
Title	Director	Cast	Genre	Notes
1900
Groep van de Hoornsche Wielrijders Club			Docufilm	Studio: Eerst Nederlandsch Atelier tot het vervaardigen van Films voor de Bioscoop en Cinematograaf M.H. Laddé & J.W. Merkelbach. The film is lost
Solser en Hesse	M.H. Laddé	Lion Solser; Piet Hesse	Comedy	Studio: Eerst Nederlandsch Atelier tot het vervaardigen van Films voor de Bioscoop en Cinematograaf M.H. Laddé & J.W. Merkelbach. The film is lost
1904
De Jongen met de Bal	Willy Mullens		Docufilm	The film is lost
1905
De mésaventure van een Fransch heertje zonder pantalon aan het strand te Zandvoort	Willy Mullens	Willy Mullens	Comedy	Oldest surviving Dutch film
1907
Een Jongmensch...	Willy Mullens		Drama	
1909
De Greep	Leon Boedels	Louis Bouwmeester; Ko van Sprinkhuysen	Drama	Recorded during a live theatre performance
