= Christiaan Slieker =

Dutch film exhibitor

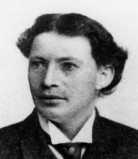
Christiaan Slieker

(George) Christiaan Slieker (1861–1945) was a Dutch film exhibitor in the early days of cinematography. He grew up in a Frisian family of travelling showpeople.

In the spring of 1896 he bought a cinematograph produced by H.O. Foersterling & Co and gave his first film show in Leeuwarden on 15 July 1896.

He began a traveling film show called the Grand Théatre Edison. During the show in Park Tivoli in Utrecht the first Dutch movie was shown, Gestoorde hengelaar by M.H. Laddé.

In 2013 the movie house in Leeuwarden was renamed Slieker Film in his honour, after it moved to the Wilhelminaplein where Slieker first showed his films.

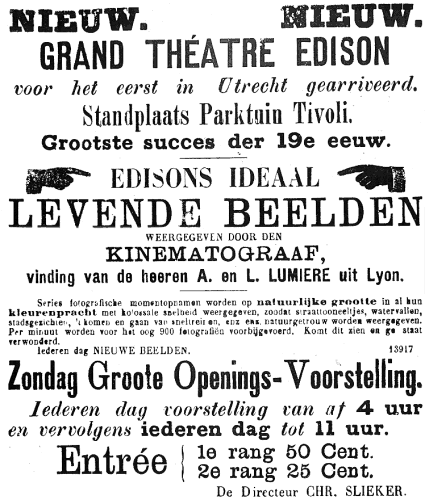
Advertisement for the traveling cinema of Christiaan Slieker in the Utrechtsch Dagblad

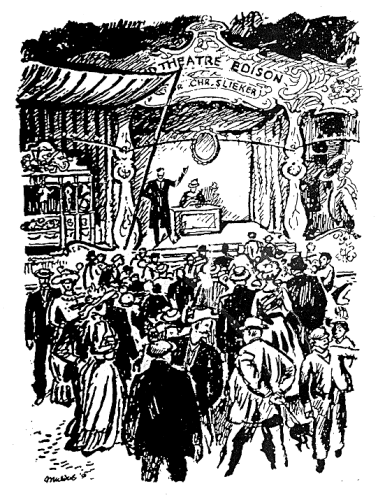
Christiaan Slieker's traveling cinema Grand Théatre Edison in Park Tivoli
