= J.W. Merkelbach =

Dutch photographer and cinematographer

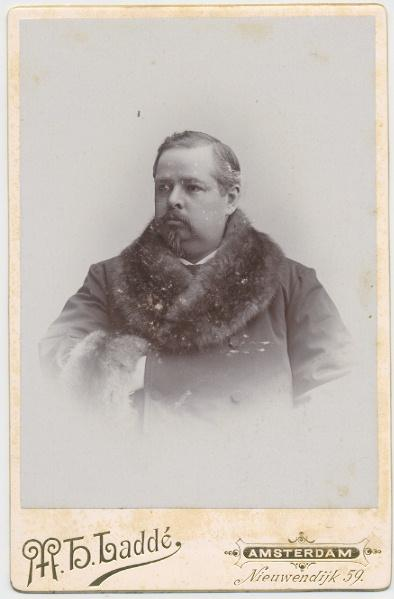
J.W. Merkelbach, photograph by M.H. Laddé

Johannes Wilhelm Merkelbach (known as Wim; born Amsterdam, 31 October 1871, died 8 December 1922) was a Dutch photographer and cinematographer who was co-founder (together with M.H. Laddé, who was his son-in-law) of the Eerst Nederlandsch Atelier tot het vervaardigen van Films voor de Bioscoop en Cinematograaf M.H. Laddé & J.W. Merkelbach, the first Dutch film studio. In 1896 he co-directed the first Dutch fictional film Gestoorde hengelaar and later he co-directed the 1900 film Solser en Hesse.

== See also ==
- Dutch films before 1910
