= De Greep =

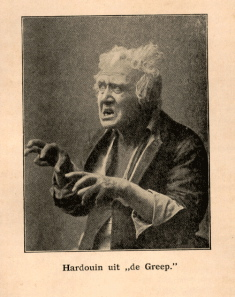
- Publicity photo of De Greep showing Louis Bouwmeester as Jean-Marie Hardouin.
- Directed by: Leon Boedels
- Produced by: Franz Anton Nöggerath jr.
- Starring: Louis Bouwmeester; Ko van Sprinkhuysen
- Distributed by: Filmfabriek F.A. Nöggerath
- Release date: 1909
- Running time: 8 minutes
- Country: Netherlands
- Language: Silent

De Greep (English: The Grip) is a 1909 Dutch silent short drama film was directed by Leon Boedels. De Greep was produced by Filmfabriek F.A. Nöggerath and is based on the French play La Griffe by Jean Sartène.

== Plot ==
Jean-Marie Hardouin is an old man who once was notorious because of the iron grip he exerted on his family but now he is lame. He whiles away his days in a chair in the house of his son and daughter-in-law. He has to see how his adulterous daughter-in-law plots to murder her two foster children and her husband. Jean-Marie can't intervene and because he can't talk he can't warn his own family. Eventually he gathers all his strengths and strangles her.

== See also ==
- List of Dutch films before 1910

== Sources ==
- (in Dutch) Algemeen Handelsblad, 4 August 1909
- (in Dutch) F. van der Maden, Mobiele filmvertoning in Nederland 1895–1913, Nijmegen (1981), p. 295
- (in Dutch) Nijmeegsche Courant, 5 October 1909
- (in Dutch) H. de Wit, Film in Utrecht van 1895 tot 1915, Utrecht (1986); Annex: p. 133
- (in Dutch) De Kinematograaf, No. 102, 1 January 1915
- (in Dutch) De Kinematograaf, No. 105, 22 January 1915
- (in Dutch) De Kinematograaf, No. 121, 14 May 1915
- G. Donaldson, Of Joy and Sorrow. A Filmography of Dutch Silent Fiction, Amsterdam (1997), p. 75
