= Piet Hesse =

Dutch actor and comedian (1872–1936)

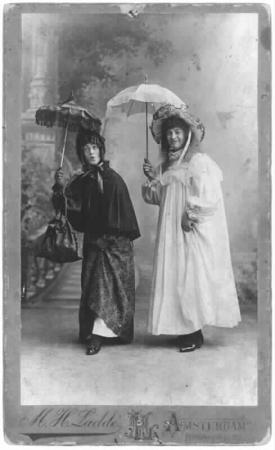
- Piet Hesse (r)
- Born: Pieter Hesse; 26 December 1872; Amsterdam
- Died: 4 March 1936 (aged 63); Bussum
- Occupations: Actor, comedian

Piet Hesse (26 December 1872 – 4 March 1936) was a Dutch comedian of the late 19th and early 20th century.

He collaborated with Lion Solser. Together they featured in the 1896 comedy film Gestoorde hengelaar by M.H. Laddé, which was the first Dutch fictional film. Later they featured again in the 1900 and 1906 comedy films both titled Solser en Hesse.

Hesse was born in Amsterdam as the son of Jacques Hesse and Antonia Elisabeth Schmand. He was married to Anna Hesse-Slauderhof and worked together with her.
