= Lion Solser =

Dutch actor and comedian (1877–1915)

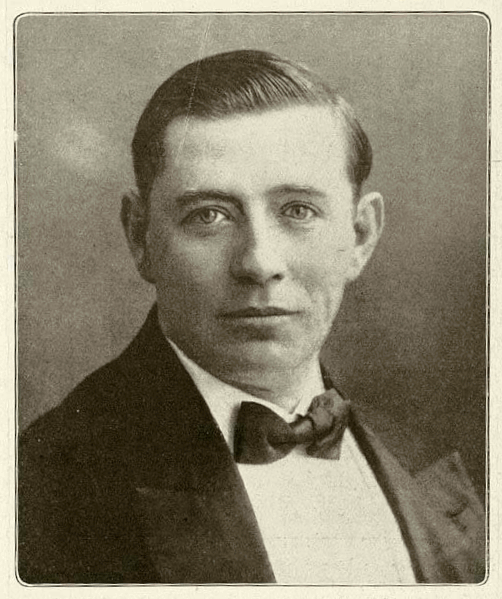
- Solser in 1915
- Born: Abraham (Lion) Solser; 6 February 1877; Rotterdam, Netherlands
- Died: 3 August 1915 (aged 38); Rotterdam, Netherlands
- Occupations: Actor, comedian
- Spouse: Adrienne Willemsens

Abraham (Lion) Solser (6 February 1877 in Rotterdam – 3 August 1915 in Rotterdam) was a Dutch comedian and early film actor of the late 19th and early 20th century. He was born to Johannes Solser (van der Vank) and Engelina Florina Hartlooper.

Solser married the stage actress Adrienne Willemsens (born 25 March 1872 in Schaerbeek, Belgium) on 10 August 1899. He collaborated with Piet Hesse. Together they featured in the 1896 comedy film Gestoorde hengelaar by M.H. Laddé, which was the first Dutch fictional film. Later they featured again in the 1900 and 1906 comedy films both titled Solser en Hesse.

Solser committed suicide on 3 August 1915 in Rotterdam at the age of 38 years.
