= Gestoorde hengelaar =

1896 film directed by M.H. Laddé and J.W. Merkelbach

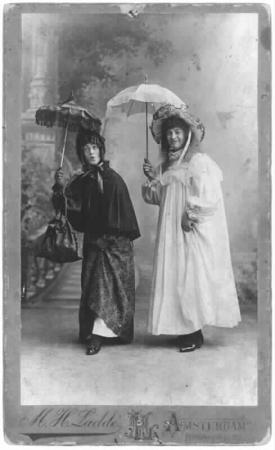
- Lion Solser and Piet Hesse, the comedians who starred in Gestoorde hengelaar
- Directed by: M.H. Laddé; J.W. Merkelbach
- Produced by: M.H. Laddé
- Starring: Lion Solser; Piet Hesse
- Cinematography: M.H. Laddé
- Distributed by: Eerst Nederlandsch Atelier tot het vervaardigen van Films voor de Bioscoop en Cinematograaf van M.H. Laddé en J.W. Merkelbach; Grand Théatre Edison (Christiaan Slieker)
- Release date: 29 November 1896
- Language: Dutch

Gestoorde hengelaar (English: Disturbed Angler) was the first Dutch fictional film, made by M.H. Laddé in 1896 and was produced by the studio Eerst Nederlandsch Atelier tot het vervaardigen van Films voor de Bioscoop en Cinematograaf van M.H. Laddé en J.W. Merkelbach("First Dutch Atelier for the production of Films for the Cinema and Cinematographer by M.H. Ladde and J.W. Merkelbach").

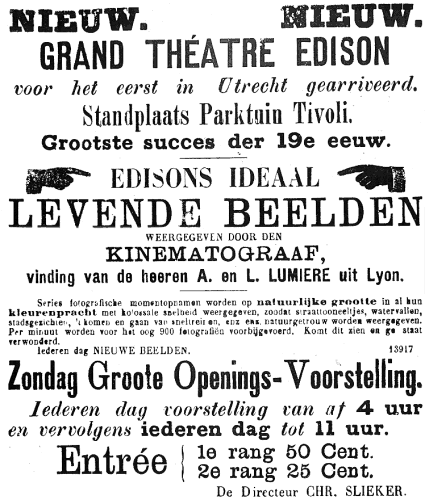
Advertisement for the traveling cinema of Christiaan Slieker in the Utrechtsch Dagblad

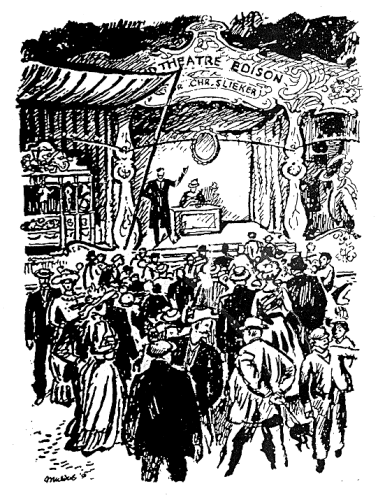
Christiaan Slieker's traveling cinema Grand Théatre Edison, which showed Gestoorde hengelaar for the first time in Utrecht, the Netherlands

The short silent film was first shown by the traveling cinema Grand Théatre Edison of Christiaan Slieker on Sunday 29 November 1896 in the Parktuin Tivoli in Utrecht.

The film was not preserved and no known photos were taken of it. That means that it is a lost film.

It is only known that Gestoorde hengelaar was a slapstick comedy scene (with Lion Solser and Piet Hesse, who were then popular Dutch comedians) from the flyer which Slieker distributed.

The film was shown in Slieker's cinema using a cinematograph, made by H.O. Foersterling & Co from Berlin, Germany. A fairground organ provided music during the film's showing.

== See also ==
- List of Dutch films before 1910

== Sources ==
- (in Dutch) A. Briels, Komst en plaats van de Levende Photographie op de kermis. Een filmhistorische verkenning, Assen (1973), p. 30
- (in Dutch) K. Dibbets & F. van der Maden (red.), Geschiedenis van de Nederlandse film en bioscoop tot 1940, Weesp (1986), p. 19
- G. Donaldson, Of Joy and Sorrow. A Filmography of Dutch Silent Fiction, Amsterdam (1997), p. 51
