= Zwemplaats voor Jongelingen te Amsterdam =

1896 film by M.H. Laddé

Zwemplaats voor Jongelingen te Amsterdam (English: Swimming Place for Youths in Amsterdam) was a short Dutch silent film by M.H. Laddé from 1896 about the then recently opened swimming pool at the Heiligeweg in Amsterdam, which was the first indoor pool in the Netherlands. The film is lost.

== See also ==
- List of Dutch films before 1910

== Sources ==
- (in Dutch) A. Briels, Komst en plaats van de Levende Photographie op de Kermis. Een filmhistorische verkenning, Assen (1973), pp. 29–30
- (in Dutch) K. Dibbets & F. van der Maden (red.), Geschiedenis van de Nederlandse film en bioscoop tot 1940, Weesp (1986), p. 19
- (in Dutch) R. Smit (red.), Filmhistorie in Eindhoven : 1897-1985, Eindhoven (1985), pp. 11–12
- (in Dutch) H. de Wit, Film in Utrecht van 1895 tot 1915, Utrecht (1986); Annex: p. 21
- (in Dutch) H. Rijken, Filmgeschiedenis van Hoorn, Hoorn (1995)
- (in Dutch) C. Bordewijk & J. Moes, Van bioscoopkwaad tot cultuurgoed. Honderd jaar film in Leiden, Utrecht (1995), p. 16
- (in Dutch) G. Donaldson, 'De eerste Nederlandse speelfilms en de gebroeders Mullens', in: Skrien Nr. 28, januari 1972, p. 8
