= Rendra Karno =

Indonesian actor

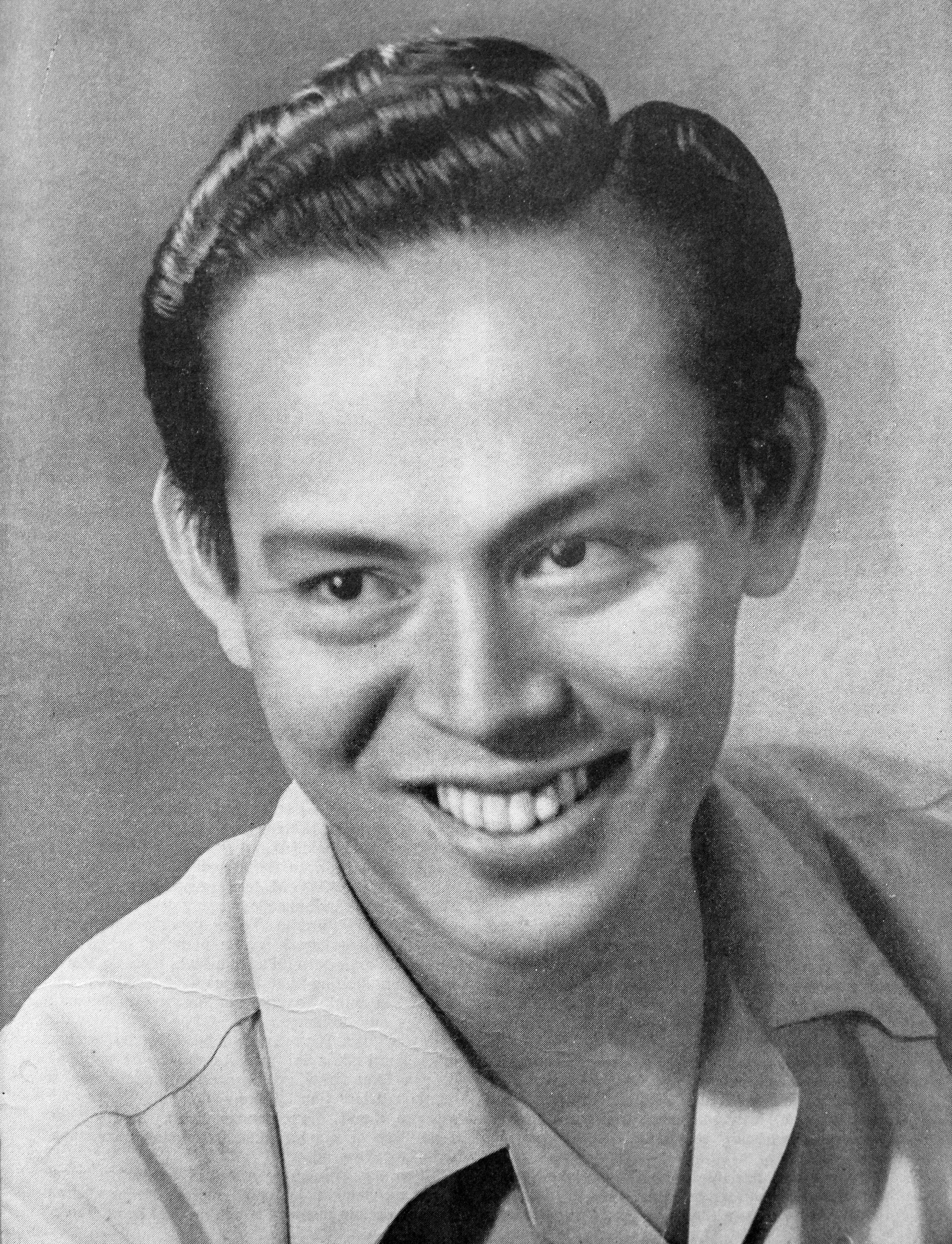
- Rendra Karno, 1954
- Born: Raden Soekarno; 7 May 1920; Kutoarjo, Dutch East Indies
- Died: 27 November 1985 (aged 65); Jakarta, Indonesia
- Occupation: Actor
- Spouse: Djuriah Karno (m. 1947)

Raden Soekarno (Perfected Spelling: Sukarno; 7 May 1920 – 27 November 1985), better known as Rendra Karno, was an Indonesian actor. Born in Kutoarjo, Central Java, Soekarno entered the film industry in 1941, making his debut appearance in Union Films' Soeara Berbisa. Over the next forty years he appeared in more than fifty films. He was also involved in the theatre during the Japanese occupation of the Dutch East Indies and the Indonesian National Revolution. For his role in 1962's Bajangan di Waktu Fadjar, he was named best supporting actor at the 1963 Asian Film Festival in Tokyo.

== Biography ==
Soekarno was born in Kutoarjo, Central Java, on 7 May 1920. The son of a noble priyayi family, he had access to a high level of education, completing his MULO studies before learning bookkeeping. His first job was as the bookkeeper for a cinema.

In 1941, as the domestic film industry was seeking young, educated actors to improve the public perception of cinema, Soekarno was approached by Union Films and cast in their production Soeara Berbisa, a film which told of two men who compete for a woman's love before discovering that they are brothers. He appeared in another film, for Union later that year, when he played a young assistant pharmacist in the company's romance Mega Mendoeng (1942). In March 1942, following the Japanese occupation of the Dutch East Indies, Union was closed, and Soekarno, though working on an adaptation of the legend Damarwulan, was let go.

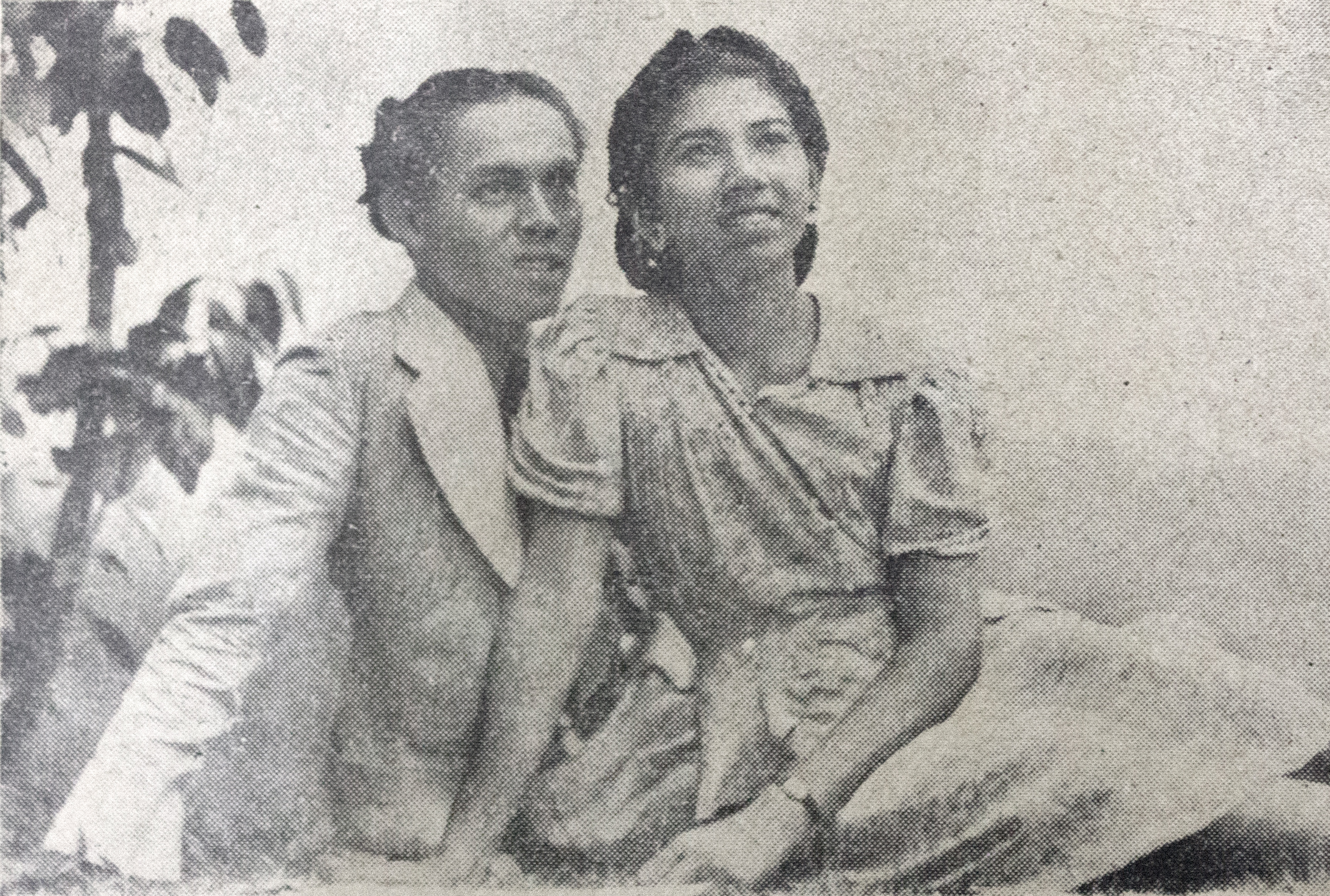
Soekarno with Boen Sofiati in Mega Mendoeng (1942)

Soekarno migrated to theatre, spending most of the occupation with the amateur theatre troupe Maya (under Usmar Ismail), though he did act in a single short propaganda film: Di Menara (1943). Following the surrender of Japan in August 1945, the Dutch colonial forces, supported by the Allies, returned to the Indonesian archipelago. In the ensuing Indonesian National Revolution (1945–1949), Soekarno was active with Fred Young's Bintang Soerabaja professional theatre troupe.

In 1948, towards the end of the revolution, Soekarno returned to film, taking a role in the South Pacific Film Corporation (SPFC) production Anggrek Bulan. On this film, he again worked with Ismail, who was serving as assistant director. Soekarno took another two roles in SPFC films in 1949, in Harta Karun and Tjitra. When the company was merged with Berita Film Indonesia to form Perusahaan Film Negara (PFN; the State Film Company), Soekarno migrated to Young's Bintang Surabaja and appeared in a number of their films, including Bintang Surabaja 1951 (1950), Djembatan Merah (1950), and Selamat Berdjuang, Masku! (1951).

As the 1950s progressed, Soekarno worked for a number of companies, including Djamaluddin Malik's Persari (Rodrigo de Villa, 1952) and PFN (Penjelundup, 1952). He also made his directorial debut in Rentjong dan Surat (1953). Soekarno's greatest popularity, however, was attained through his work with Ismail's Perfini studio, for whom he first appeared in 1953's Kafedo and Krisis. He gained the greatest popular recognition for his role in the latter film, a comedy about the conflicts between different families occupying the same house, and appeared in its sequel Lagi-Lagi Krisis two years later. Shortly afterwards, Soekarno changed his name to Rendra Karno, heeding a recent demand from President Sukarno that all European and feudal names (such as the title Raden) be abandoned.

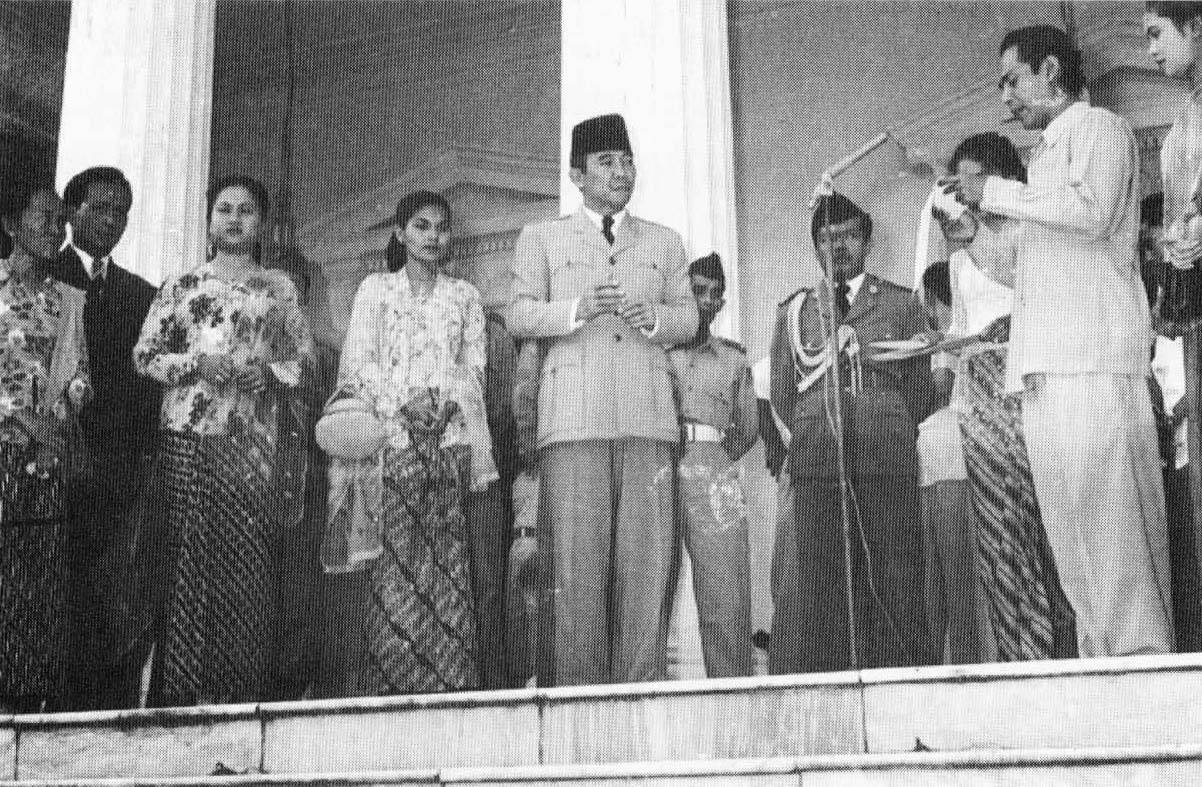
Rendra Karno (right) reading actors' demands to President Sukarno (centre) in front of Merdeka Palace, Jakarta, in 1956

As a member of the Indonesian Film Actors Union (Persatuan Artis Film Indonesia, or PARFI), Rendra Karno was also involved in efforts to protect the struggling domestic film industry against imported films from Malaysia, India, and the United States. On 12 March 1956, Rendra Karno went to Merdeka Palace, Jakarta, together with nine other actors and actresses to read a list of demands to President Sukarno. These included a reconsideration of existing import laws, the establishment of a film library, and increased involvement of Indonesia in international film festivals. These demands, however, were not met.

Rendra Karno remained active with Perfini into the 1960s, appearing in such productions as Tiga Dara (1956), Tjambuk Api (1958), Pedjuang (1960), and Bajangan di Waktu Fadjar (1962). For this last film, a collaboration between Perfini and Merdeka Film of Malaysia, he received best supporting actor at the 1963 Asian Film Festival in Tokyo. In 1965, after appearing in Tjendrawasih Films' Takkan Lari Gunung Dikedjar, he took a five-year sabbatical.

In 1971 Rendra Karno returned to the Indonesian film industry, appearing in and serving as assistant director for Hutan Tantangan. Over the next decade, he appeared in a further eight films, including Putri Solo (1974) and Para Perintis Kemerdekaan (1981); Karno also worked as a crew member for several productions. Rendra Karno died in Jakarta on 27 November 1985.

== Filmography ==
During his four decades as an actor, Soekarno (Rendra Karno) appeared in some fifty-two roles. He also directed one film: Rentjong dan Surat (1953).

- Mega Mendoeng (1941)
- Soeara Berbisa (1941)
- Di Menara (1943)
- Anggrek Bulan (1948)
- Tjitra (1949)
- Harta Karun (1949)
- Bintang Surabaja 1951 (1950)
- Damarwulan (1950)
- Djembatan Merah (1950)
- Ratapan Ibu (1950)
- Bunga Bangsa (1951)
- Bunga Rumah Makan (1951)
- Djiwa Pemuda (1951)
- Terbelenggu (1951)
- Pelarian dari Pagar Besi (1951)
- Selamat Berdjuang, Masku! (1951)
- Chandra Dewi (1952)
- Penjelundup (1952)
- Rodrigo de Villa (1952)
- Kafedo (1953)
- Kassan (1953)
- Krisis (1953)
- Debu Revolusi (1954)
- Kopral Djono (1954)
- Bapak Bersalah (1955)
- Arni (1955)
- Lagi-lagi Krisis (1955)
- Tiga Dara (1956)
- Bertjerai Kasih (1956)
- Sengketa (1957)
- Djendral Kantjil (1958)
- Pak Prawiro (1958)
- Tjambuk Api (1958)
- Asrama Dara (1958)
- Habis Gelap Terbitlah Terang (Hilang Gelap Datang Terang) (1959)
- Pedjuang (1960)
- Mak Tjomblang (1960)
- Amor dan Humor (1961)
- Bajangan Diwaktu Fadjar (1962)
- Masa Topan dan Badai (1963)
- Ekspedisi Terakhir (1964)
- Takkan Lari Gunung Dikedjar (1965)
- Hutan Tantangan (1971)
- Putri Solo (1974)
- Sayangilah Daku (1974)
- Para Perintis Kemerdekaan (1977)
- Cintaku Tergadai (1977)
- Mutiara (1977)
- Petualang Cinta (1978)
- Bersemi di Akhir Badai (1978)
- Kembang Semusim (1980)

== Works cited ==
- Apa Siapa Orang Film Indonesia [What and Who: Film Figures in Indonesia] (in Indonesian). Jakarta: Indonesian Ministry of Information. 1999. OCLC 44427179.
- Biran, Misbach Yusa, ed. (1979). Apa Siapa Orang Film Indonesia 1926–1978 [What and Who: Film Figures in Indonesia, 1926–1978]. Jakarta: Sinematek Indonesia. OCLC 6655859.
- Biran, Misbach Yusa (2009a). Sejarah Film 1900–1950: Bikin Film di Jawa [History of Film 1900–1950: Making Films in Java] (in Indonesian). Jakarta: Komunitas Bamboo working with the Jakarta Art Council. ISBN 978-979-3731-58-2.
- Biran, Misbach Yusa (2009b). Peran Pemuda dalam Kebangkitan Film Indonesia [The Role of the Youth in the Development of the Indonesian Film Industry] (in Indonesian). Jakarta: Ministry of Youth and Sports. OCLC 607257806.
- Kristanto, JB, ed. (2007). Katalog Film Indonesia 1926– 2007. Jakarta: Nalar. ISBN 978-979-26-9006-4.
- "Raden Soekarno – Filmografi" [Raden Soekarno – Filmography]. filmindonesia.or.id (in Indonesian). Jakarta: Konfiden Foundation. Archived from the original on 10 August 2016.
- "Soeara Berbisa". filmindonesia.or.id (in Indonesian). Jakarta: Konfiden Foundation. Archived from the original on 10 November 2013.
