= Norma Bahia Pontes =

Brazilian filmmaker (1941–2010)

- Born: 25 January 1941; Salvador, Bahia, Brazil
- Died: 24 August 2010 (aged 69); Rio de Janeiro, Brazil
- Education: Institut des hautes études cinématographiques; The New School for Social Research
- Occupations: Filmmaker; film theorist; film critic; essayist
- Awards: Guggenheim Fellowship (1974)

Norma Bahia Pontes (25 January 1941 – 24 August 2010) was a Brazilian filmmaker. Originally working as a film theorist, critic, and essayist, she directed two short films while in France, where she had previously been educated at the Institut des hautes études cinématographiques. Amidst the escalation of the military dictatorship in Brazil, she and her partner Rita Moreira fled to New York City to continue filmmaking, studying at The New School for Social Research. A 1974 Guggenheim Fellow, she and Moreira co-directed several videotaped films, many of which are considered lost – Lesbian Mothers (1972), Living in New York City (fl. 1974–1977), and Looking for the Amazons (1977) – and founded the Women for Women arts festival and the distribution company Amazon Media Project.

== Biography ==
=== Early life and career ===
Norma Bahia Pontes was born on 25 January 1941 in Salvador, Bahia. She attended university in Rio de Janeiro, (Note: Sources differ on the exact university. Rosa said that Pontes obtained a sociology degree at the Federal University of Rio de Janeiro, but Perez, citing a 1975 São Paulo Biennial Foundation curriculum vitae Pontes wrote, said that she instead obtained a philosophy degree from the Pontifical Catholic University of Rio de Janeiro and took an extension course in film.) and she studied directing and editing at the Institut des hautes études cinématographiques.

She worked as a film theorist and essayist; she wrote articles and reviews for Correio da Manhã, Civilização Brasileira, Tempo Brasileiro, and she was later infrequently acknowledged in academic literature of Glauber Rocha and his film Black God, White Devil, including Alex Viany's recollection of her participation in a contemporary debate on the 1964 film Black God, White Devil in his 1999 book O processo do Cinema Novo. Viany later listed her as the only woman out of hundreds of "the most prominent personalities of the Cinema Novo movement" in a 1970 Cinemateca do Museu de Arte Moderna catalogue. Lívia Perez said that Pontes' work in Deus e o diabo na terra do sol (1964) and Cinema Moderno, Cinema Novo (1966) made her "the only woman who co-authored two important books of the [Cinema Novo] period", and Cecile Lagesse said her work in the latter "specifically appeal[s] to Bazin's idea" in order to discuss the era's aesthetics.

She started directing films in the advertising industry. She was also director of the Instituto Brasileiro de Estudos Afro-Asiáticos' film division.

Pontes, who was a member of the Communist Party of Brazil (PCdoB), had worked on a film on the peasantry of Zona da Mata, titled Cabra marcado para morrer, but it was never released, presumably due to production issues with the 1964 Brazilian coup d'état. After returning to Paris for an internship at the Musée de l'Homme with filmmaker Jean Rouch, she made her directorial debut with Les antillais/Os antilhenses, a 1967 short film about the anti-racist and anti-colonialist awareness of the Antillean community of Paris, and directed Chants Brésiliens, a 1967 episode of the ORTF news programme Seize millions de jeunes portraying the singer Edu Lobo as "a representative of engaged Brazilian song". After returning to Brazil, she directed Bahia Camará (1969), a short film about the situation of her native state Bahia before the enactment of Institutional Act Number Five.

=== Career in New York City ===
Amidst the escalation of the military dictatorship in Brazil, which had banned the PCdoB and arrested several of her associates, she left the country's film industry to work as an advertising executive. In the early 1970s, she and her partner Rita Moreira, whom she met at a party for Editora Abril employees, fled to New York City, having been inspired to move there by its handheld video culture and a newspaper image depicting its lesbian community. Together, they studied documentary video at The New School for Social Research and started co-directing videotaped film, with Fontes as the films' camera operator. Their early work included Lesbian Mothers, a 1972 short film about the motherhood of lesbian couples which premiered at the New York Women's Video Festival and was the New School's entry at the First Tokyo Video Festival; it also addressed lesbians' experience of homophobia and showed a montage of images of lesbian love playing to Nina Simone's music, which Maria Laura Rosa said "interwove bodies with discourses".

In 1974, Pontes was awarded a Guggenheim Fellowship, which enabled her to purchase her filming equipment for Living in New York City, an eight-videotape series on "the ecology of the city and its characters". One of these videos, She Has A Beard, focused on a bearded lady who refuses to shave and questions other women about the feminine beauty ideal; exceptional themes noted by other observers included the bearded lady's change in focus from object to subject stood out, as well as defiance of gender norms. A third one, The Apartment (1975–1976), showed a lesbian women do stereotypically male jobs such as house maintenance and handyman work, which Rosa calls a challenge of gender roles. According to Rosa, both of these films and Lesbian Mothers "demonstrate a work of singular importance in the path toward lesbian visibility and the deconstruction of gender, resulting in pioneering works for American and Brazilian feminist art".

The duo also founded their own distribution company Amazon Media Project, and in 1974, organized the Women for Women arts festival at SoHo, Manhattan, featuring the work of such filmmakers as Helena Solberg. Pontes was said in 1972 to be "the only Brazilian filmmaker who has worked professionally with half-inch videotape". In 1973, she and Moreira personally protested Millôr Fernandes' anti-feminist remarks by handing in their op-eds to the dissident newspaper Opinião 's offices.

Perez also acknowledged Pontes' use of a cheap medium like videotape as "the encounter between the lesbian director's desire for fulfillment [...] with an economically viable device in an extremely favorable social context". Machado called her work with Moreira an example of the political use of video by racial and sexual minorities, noting that their work focused on ecology, feminism, and minority advocacy.

=== Later life, death, and legacy ===
In 1977, the two returned to Brazil to co-direct the film Looking for the Amazons in the Amazon rainforest; only some excerpts had survived by 2020 because Moreira had self-admittedly disposed of her only copy due to having "too much lines". She later moved to Rio de Janeiro after the two went their separate ways, and outside of some unproduced projects, her last video was the lost film A Cor da Terra (1988), co-directed with Ana Porto. Afterwards, she reportedly "tried to reposition herself in the advertising market while delirious with megalomaniacal projects that did not find trust or financial support to carry out", before her lesbophobic sister kicked her out of her residence and had her committed to psychiatric hospitals.

Pontes died on 24 August 2010 in Rio de Janeiro. Originally, she had limited attention to her work in academic research despite her productive career, before she was given an in-depth 2020 scholarly article in the academic journal Rebeca – Revista Brasileira de Estudos de Cinema e Audiovisual, acknowledging her as "a pioneer in lesbian feminist video production in the United States during the 1970s." In 2017, Rosa called her and Moreira "pioneers of feminist activism in the Southern Cone".

== Filmography ==
=== As director ===
Year	Title	Note	Ref.
1967	Les antillais/Os antilhenses		
1967	Seize millions de jeunes	Episode: "Chants Brésiliens"	
1968	Bahia Camará	Produced by Ministry of Foreign Affairs	
1972	Lesbian Mothers	Co-directed with Moreira	
1974	Lesbianism Feminism	Co-directed with Moreira; part of the Living in New York City series	
1975	She Has a Beard	Co-directed with Moreira; part of the Living in New York City series	
1975 or 1976	The Apartment	Co-directed with Moreira; part of the Living in New York City series	
1977	On Drugs	Co-directed with Moreira; part of the Living in New York City series	
1977	Walking Around	Co-directed with Moreira; part of the Living in New York City series	
1977	Born in a Prison	Co-directed with Moreira; part of the Living in New York City series	
Unknown	Just another crime, next door this time	Co-directed with Moreira; part of the Living in New York City series; considered lost	
Unknown	The Kid at Times Square and the Bird on Broadway	Co-directed with Moreira; part of the Living in New York City series; considered lost	
1977	Looking for the Amazons	Co-directed with Moreira; only excerpts survive	
1988	A Cor da Terra	Co-directed with Ana Porto; considered lost	

=== Others ===
Year	Title	Note	Ref.
1964	Cabra marcado para morrer	As writer; unreleased film on the peasants of Zona da Mata	
1965	Um dia no Cais	As actress, during her time with the Cinemateca do MAM/RJ's Experimental Cinema Group	
1965	Society em baby doll	As assistant director; Perez says that Pontes may have been part of the cast	
