= Rita Moreira =

Brazilian film director

Rita Moreira (born 1944, São Paulo) is a Brazilian filmmaker, journalist and writer. Her documentaries are known for focusing on social issues, usually emphasizing members of society on the margins of large urban centers. The themes of her films range from abandoned children and racism to gender and sexuality issues. Her films are considered landmarks of the feminist approach to film in Brazil during the 70s and 80s.

She studied documentary filmmaking at New School for Social Research in New York, graduating in 1972. Together with her partner and journalist Norma Bahia Pontes, Moreira produced "Lesbian Mothers" in 1972 about mothers in homosexual relationships and "She Has a Beard" (1975), in which she addresses facial hair in women. The first was the result of a course she took at the New School and represented the college at the first Tokyo Video Festival. The second film was a part of the series "Living in New York City", a project for which her partner Pontes received a grant from the John Simon Guggenheim Memorial Foundation to focus on appreciating New York City itself. This series includes "The Apartment" (1975–56) and "Walking Around" (1977). Returning to Brazil she produced,"A Dama do Pacaembu"(1983), run in partnership with Maria Luísa Leal, which shows the life of a homeless woman in the upscale area of the Pacaembu neighborhood of São Paulo, and "Hunting Season" (1988), about homophobia in the post-re-democratization period in Brazil. In 1995, she was awarded the $15,000 joint audiovisual grant from the Rockefeller, MacArthur and Lampadia foundations to record "The Other... Me."

As a journalist while in New York in the 1970s she was a correspondent for the weekly "Opinião" and also wrote for the magazines "Realidade" and "Nova", in addition to working on editorial bodies such as Nova Cultural, Globo, and Time Life. For Nova Cultural, she was responsible for the etymology section of "Encyclopedia Larousse." In addition, she published poetry books, such as "Maria Morta em Mim" (1963), written when she was still seventeen, "The Hour of the Greatest Love" (1965), "Peering into the Papaya" (1999), and "Coração de Ontem" (2015).
