= Spelende kinderen =

1896 film by M.H. Laddé

Spelende kinderen (English: Playing Children) was a short Dutch silent film by M.H. Laddé from 1896. The film is lost.

== See also ==
- List of Dutch films before 1910

== Sources ==
- (in Dutch) A. Briels, Komst en plaats van de Levende Photographie op de kermis. Een filmhistorische verkenning, Assen (1973), p. 30
- (in Dutch) K. Dibbets & F. van der Maden (red.), Geschiedenis van de Nederlandse film en bioscoop tot 1940, Weesp (1986), p. 19
- (in Dutch) R. Smit (red.), Filmhistorie in Eindhoven : 1897–1985, Eindhoven (1985), p. 12
- (in Dutch) H. Rijken, Filmgeschiedenis van Hoorn, Hoorn (1995)
- (in Dutch) G. Donaldson, 'De eerste Nederlandse speelfilms en de gebroeders Mullens', in: Skrien Nr. 28, January 1972, p. 8
