= Mega Mendoeng =

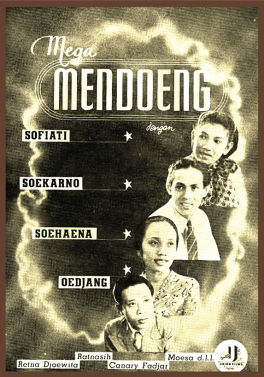
- Advertisement
- Directed by: Boen Kim Nam
- Produced by: Ang Hock Liem
- Starring: Rd Soekarno; Oedjang; Boen Sofiati; Soehaena
- Production company: Union Films
- Release date: 1942 (Dutch East Indies)
- Country: Dutch East Indies
- Language: Indonesian

Mega Mendoeng ([məˈga mənˈdʊŋ]; Perfected Spelling: Mega Mendung) is a black-and-white drama film from the Dutch East Indies (now Indonesia) directed by Boen Kin Nam and produced by Ang Hock Liem for Union Films. Starring Rd Soekarno, Oedjang, Boen Sofiati, and Soehaena, it follows two young lovers who are separated by lies but ultimately reunite at the village of Mega Mendoeng in Bogor. This film, Union's seventh and final production, was shot concurrently with Soeara Berbisa and completed over a period of three months. It was released in early 1942 and screened as late as July of that year, but may now be lost.

== Plot ==
Winanta's father, Raden Koesoema, tells him that he should divorce his wife, Retnaningsih, to marry his cousin Fatimah, on threat of being disowned. To spare her husband from this fate, Retnaningsih decides to abandon him and moves from Bandung to Batavia (now Jakarta), where she lives a life of poverty. Unknown to her, this decision is used by Raden Koesoema as proof of her that she was not trustworthy. Winanta falls into despair, but eventually marries Fatimah.

Eighteen years later, Winanta and Fatimah have had a daughter named Koestini (Boen Sofiati), who is studying in Batavia. Educated, graceful, and beautiful, she is popular with young men but only returns the affections of Soedjono (Rd Soekarno), a young assistant pharmacist who is polite and refined. One of her spurned suitors, Soekatma, decides to ruin their relationship by telling Winanta that Koestini has spent all of her time chasing boys rather than studying. Believing these lies, Winanta recalls Koestini to Bandung.

Koestini falls ill, and her death is reported. Driven mad by the news, Soedjono begins wandering aimlessly. Ultimately, as if guided by some unseen force, he discovers Koestini alive in a village called Mega Mendoeng, near Bogor. This discovery brings him back to his senses, and the two are able to live happily together. (Note: This plot summary is derived from Pertjatoeran Doenia dan Film 1941, Mega Mendoeng and Filmindonesia.or.id, Mega Mendoeng.)

== Production ==
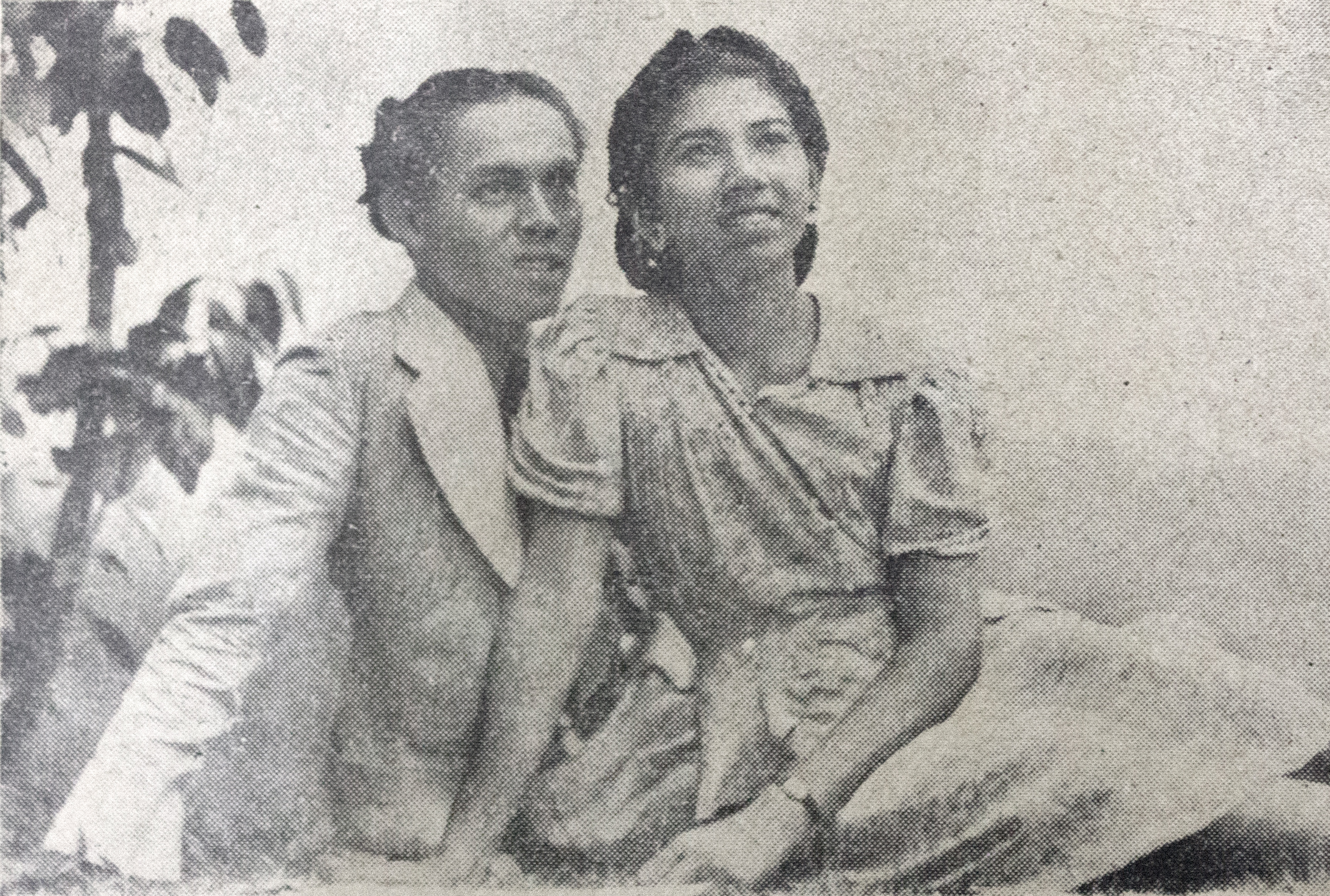
Rd Soekarno and Boen Sofiati in a scene from the film

Mega Mendoeng was directed by Boen Kin Nam for Union Films, a production house based out of Batavia (now Jakarta) which was run by Tjoa Ma Tjoen and financed by Ang Hock Liem. A sound technician by training, Mega Mendoeng was Boen's only full directorial credit. Liem served as producer. The film was announced in September 1941 and produced concurrently with Soeara Berbisa (Venomous Voice), a film on which Boen acted as assistant director. Mega Mendoeng was completed by December 1941, after Soeara Berbisa.

The black-and-white film starred Rd Soekarno, Oedjang, Boen Sofiati, (Note: Also spelled Boon Sofiati (Pertjatoeran Doenia dan Film 1942, Tanja Djawab)) and Soehaena; it also featured Ratna Djoewita, Ratnasih, Gamari Fadjar, and Moesa. Oedjang had acted for Union since its first film, Kedok Ketawa (The Laughing Mask; 1940), while Soekarno and Soehaena had made their debuts in Soeara Berbisa. Sofiati, a stage actress who operated her own troupe, was a newcomer to cinema. This cast was of various socio-economic backgrounds, including noblemen and stage actors. Although Union stated that the film was made along realist lines and aimed at educated viewers, owing to the inclusion of stage actors – people who usually entertained lower class audiences – the Indonesian film historian Misbach Yusa Biran suggests that this was untrue.

== Release and legacy ==
Mega Mendoeng was released in early 1942, the seventh and final film completed by Union. With a Japanese invasion looming, the February 1942 edition of the film magazine Pertjatoeran Doenia dan Film reported that several studios would move away from the colonial capital of Batavia or go on a production hiatus. Union, though already beginning production of a film set in the Majapahit era titled Damar Woelan, was forced to close shop; it never reopened. Soekarno returned to the film industry in the 1950s and was active until the 1970s, mostly credited as Rendra Karno.

Mega Mendoeng was screened as late as July 1942, but may now be lost. Movies were then shot on highly flammable nitrate film, and after a fire destroyed much of Produksi Film Negara's warehouse in 1952, old films shot on nitrate were deliberately destroyed. As such, the American visual anthropologist Karl G. Heider suggests that all Indonesian films from before 1950 are lost. However, J.B. Kristanto's Katalog Film Indonesia records several as having survived at Sinematek Indonesia's archives, and Biran writes that several Japanese propaganda films have survived at the Netherlands Government Information Service.

== Works cited ==
- Biran, Misbach Yusa, ed. (1979). Apa Siapa Orang Film Indonesia 1926–1978 [What and Who: Film Figures in Indonesia, 1926–1978] (in Indonesian). Jakarta: Sinematek Indonesia. OCLC 6655859.
- Biran, Misbach Yusa (2009). Sejarah Film 1900–1950: Bikin Film di Jawa [History of Film 1900–1950: Making Films in Java] (in Indonesian). Jakarta: Komunitas Bamboo working with the Jakarta Art Council. ISBN 978-979-3731-58-2.
- Biran, Misbach Yusa (2012). "Film di Masa Kolonial" [Film in the Colonial Period]. Indonesia dalam Arus Sejarah: Masa Pergerakan Kebangsaan [Indonesia in the Flow of Time: The Nationalist Movement] (in Indonesian). Vol. V. Ministry of Education and Culture. pp. 268–93. ISBN 978-979-9226-97-6.
- Heider, Karl G (1991). Indonesian Cinema: National Culture on Screen. Honolulu: University of Hawaii Press. ISBN 978-0-8248-1367-3.
- "Film2 yang Dipertoendjoekkan oleh Bioscoop2 di Djakarta Ini Malam (8 Djoeli 2602)" [Films Showing in Theatres in Jakarta Tonight (8 July 2602)]. Pembangoen (in Indonesian). Jakarta. 8 July 1942. p. 5. Archived from the original on 28 July 2014.
- "Mega Mendoeng". Pertjatoeran Doenia Dan Film (in Indonesian). 1 (7). Batavia: 19. December 1941.
- "Mega Mendoeng". filmindonesia.or.id (in Indonesian). Jakarta: Konfiden Foundation. Archived from the original on 2 December 2013.
- "Oedjang". filmindonesia.or.id (in Indonesian). Jakarta: Konfiden Foundation. Archived from the original on 21 May 2014.
- "Soeara Berbisa" [Venomous Voice]. Pertjatoeran Doenia Dan Film (in Indonesian). 1 (5). Batavia: 29. October 1941.
- "Warta dari Studio" [Reports from Studios]. Pertjatoeran Doenia Dan Film (in Indonesian). 1 (4). Batavia: 26–28. September 1941.
- "Studio Nieuws" [Studio News]. Pertjatoeran Doenia Dan Film (in Indonesian). 1 (9). Batavia: 18–20. February 1942.
- "Tanja Djawab" [Questions and Answers]. Pertjatoeran Doenia Dan Film (in Indonesian). 1 (9). Batavia: 25. February 1942.
- "Tirai Terbentang" [Open Curtains]. Pertjatoeran Doenia Dan Film (in Indonesian). 1 (7). Batavia: 28–29. December 1941.
