= Solser en Hesse =

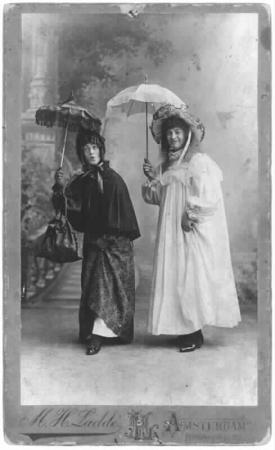
- Lion Solser and Piet Hesse
- Directed by: M.H. Laddé and J.W. Merkelbach
- Starring: Piet Hesse and Lion Solser
- Release dates: 1900; 1906
- Country: Netherlands
- Language: Silent

Solser en Hesse (transl. Solser and Hesse) were two short Dutch silent films by M.H. Laddé and J.W. Merkelbach from 1900 and 1906, respectively, featuring the comedians Lion Solser and Piet Hesse. Both running for 1 "act", the first film was distributed by Edison's Ideal in 35mm film. In 1906, a sequel film was commissioned by The Royal Bioscope for release of July 1, 1906. It was produced by F.A. Nöggerath Senior at Filmfabriek F.A. Nöggerath. It was also important, in that it made use of Sound On-Disk. Both films are lost, no copies or visual media of the films are known to exist in the EYE film institute archives in the Netherlands.

The pictures showed the team in fictional dramatizations of their popular stage plays that they had grown so famous for.

== See also ==
- List of Dutch films before 1910

== Sources ==
- (in Dutch) Wereldkroniek, October 1936, pp. 1662–63
