= Soeara Berbisa =

1941 film by R Hu

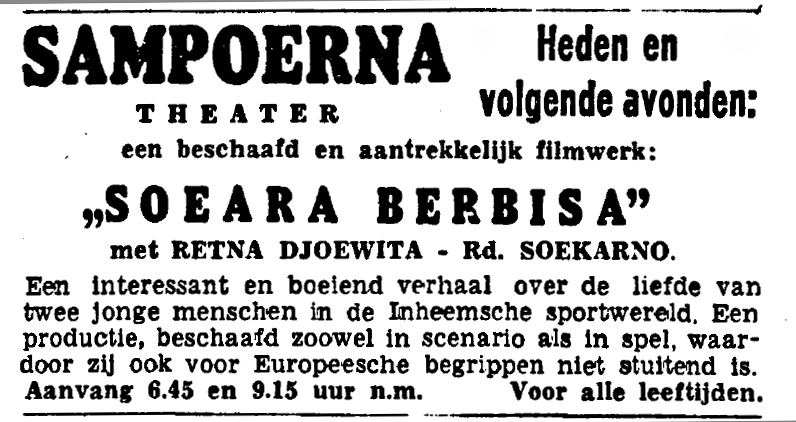
- Newspaper advertisement
- Directed by: R Hu
- Screenplay by: Djojopranoto
- Produced by: Ang Hock Liem
- Starring: Raden Soekarno; Ratna Djoewita; Oedjang; Soehaena
- Production company: Union Films
- Release date: October 1941 (Dutch East Indies)
- Country: Dutch East Indies
- Language: Indonesian

Soeara Berbisa ([suˈara bərˈbisa]; Perfected Spelling: Suara Berbisa; Indonesian for Venomous Voice) is a 1941 film from the Dutch East Indies. Produced by Ang Hock Liem for Union Films and directed by R Hu, this black-and-white film stars Raden Soekarno, Ratna Djoewita, Oedjang, and Soehaena. The story, written by Djojopranoto, follows two young men who compete for the affections of a woman before learning that they are long-lost brothers.

Filmed in September and October 1941, Soeara Berbisa features keroncong music and was shot partly in western Java. It was released to coincide with the Eid al-Fitr holiday and rated for all ages. Advertisements emphasised the film's appeal to both native and Dutch audiences, and a review in De Indische Courant was positive. Although the film—Union's penultimate production—was screened as late as 1949, it is now likely lost.

== Plot ==
A young athlete named Mitra and his sweetheart Neng Mardinah are to be wed. However, a young man named Mardjohan has fallen in love with Mardinah, and to win her heart he spreads rumours about Mitra being the son of a convicted criminal. In the backlash over the rumours, Mitra abandons the city and his beloved, hoping to find peace in the countryside.

There, Mitra finds work at a factory which is, coincidentally, owned by Mardjohan. Refusing the romantic advances of a worker there, he leaves the factory. One day, he comes across Mardjohan, gravely injured following an accident. Mitra saves the man, then takes him for treatment. Mardjohan's mother, seeing Mitra, believes that he is her son who went missing when he was aged three. She finds several witnesses who testify to the resemblance and is ultimately able to prove her suspicions. Meanwhile, Mitra's name is cleared, and he is reunited with Mardinah. (Note: Plot derived from the summary in Pertjatoeran Doenia dan Film (Pertjatoeran Doenia dan Film 1941, "Soeara Berbisa", p. 29).)

== Production ==
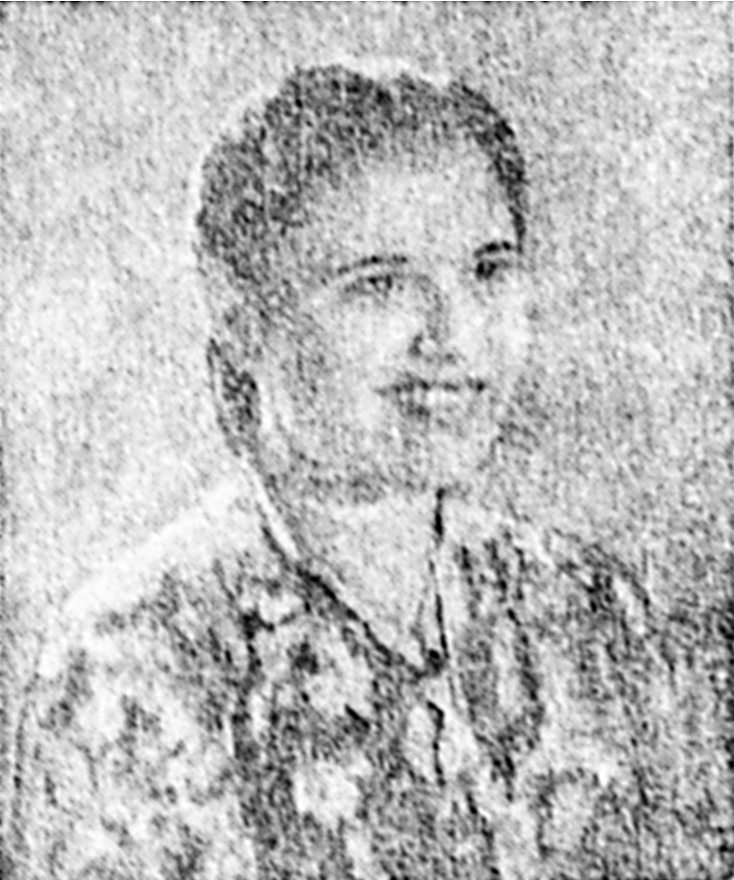
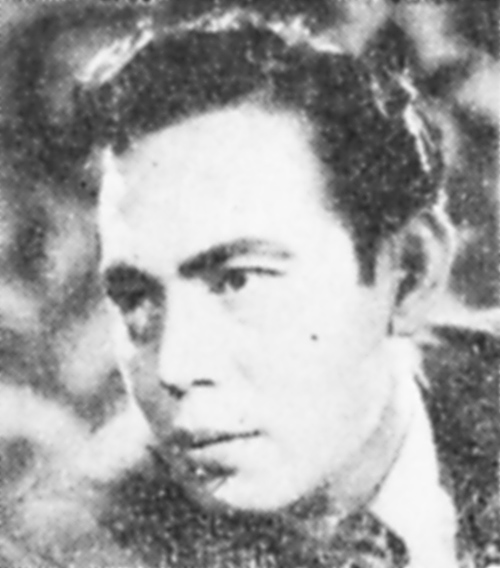
Promotional stills of Ratna Djoewita (left) and Raden Soekarno, the stars of Soeara Berbisa

The sixth production of Union Films, Soeara Berbisa was produced by Ang Hock Liem and directed by R Hu, an ethnic Chinese director who had worked for the company since 1940; the sound technician Boen Kin Nam served as assistant director. The screenplay was written by Djojopranoto, who replaced Union's former screenwriter Saeroen after he left for rival company Star Film following the completion of Wanita dan Satria (1941). The film began production by September 1941, and by October it was nearly complete.

Soeara Berbisa stars Raden Soekarno and Ratna Djoewita and features the actors Oedjang and Soehaena. Soekarno and Soehana were new hires, whereas Oedjang and Djoewita had previously done work for Union. Oedjang had been acting for Union since its first production, Kedok Ketawa, in 1940, and Djoewita had a role in Wanita dan Satria. This black-and-white film includes several keroncong songs and was partly shot in the Preanger region of west Java.

== Release and reception ==
Union announced that Soeara Berbisa would be released to coincide with the Eid al-Fitr holiday, which began on 22 October 1941, and advertisements for screenings in Medan, in northern Sumatra, date to early November 1941. A review in the Surabaya edition of De Indische Courant, however, indicates that the film had only premiered in the east Javan city on 14 January 1942. That newspaper gave a positive review, describing Soeara Berbisa as a tense film with humorous moments and beautiful scenery. Its review ended with a recommendation that young people and their parents see the film.

Soeara Berbisa was open to audiences of all ages. To reach educated audiences, Union claimed to have "paid attention to dialogue, arranged it as best as possible in accordance with the wants of the Indonesian people". (Note: Original: " ... moelai memperhatikan dialoognja, diatoer sebaik-baiknja dengan memperhatikan kemaoean penonton bangsa Indonesia".) In Dutch-language newspapers, the film was advertised as "an interesting and fascinating tale of two young men in the world of indigenous sports", (Note: Original: "Een interessant en boeiend verhaal over de liefde van twee jonge menschen in de Inheemsche sportwereld.") which nonetheless was produced in a "civilised" manner such that it could be appreciated by European audiences. (Note: Original: "Een productie, beschaafd zoowel in scenario als in spel, waardoor zij ook voor Europeesche begrippen niet stuitend is.")

== Legacy ==
Union's final production, Mega Mendoeng, was directed by Boen and released in early 1942. It again starred Soekarno, though this time alongside the new find Sofiati. The company was closed after the Japanese occupied the Indies in March 1942, and most of its employees never returned to the film industry. Soekarno was an exception; he continued to act until the 1970s, though he was generally credited as Rendra Karno.

Soeara Berbisa was screened as late as February 1949. The film is likely lost. All movies at the time were shot on flammable nitrate film, and after a fire destroyed much of Produksi Film Negara's warehouse in 1952, old films shot on nitrate were deliberately destroyed. As such, American visual anthropologist Karl G. Heider suggests that all Indonesian films from before 1950 are lost. However, JB Kristanto's Katalog Film Indonesia (Indonesian Film Catalogue) records several as having survived at Sinematek Indonesia's archives, and film historian Misbach Yusa Biran writes that several Japanese propaganda films have survived at the Netherlands Government Information Service.

== Works cited ==
- Biran, Misbach Yusa, ed. (1979). Apa Siapa Orang Film Indonesia 1926–1978 [What and Who: Film Figures in Indonesia, 1926–1978] (in Indonesian). Sinematek Indonesia. OCLC 6655859.
- Biran, Misbach Yusa (2009). Sejarah Film 1900–1950: Bikin Film di Jawa [History of Film 1900–1950: Making Films in Java] (in Indonesian). Jakarta: Komunitas Bamboo working with the Jakarta Art Council. ISBN 978-979-3731-58-2.
- Biran, Misbach Yusa (2012). "Film di Masa Kolonial" [Film in the Colonial Period]. Indonesia dalam Arus Sejarah: Masa Pergerakan Kebangsaan [Indonesia in the Flow of Time: The Nationalist Movement] (in Indonesian). Vol. V. Ministry of Education and Culture. pp. 268–93. ISBN 978-979-9226-97-6.
- "Filmnieuws: Sampoerna: 'Soeara Berbisa'" [Film News: Sampoerna: 'Soeara Berbisa']. De Indische Courant (in Dutch). Surabaya. 15 January 1942. p. 2.
- Heider, Karl G (1991). Indonesian Cinema: National Culture on Screen. Honolulu: University of Hawaii Press. ISBN 978-0-8248-1367-3.
- "Oedjang". filmindonesia.or.id (in Indonesian). Jakarta: Konfiden Foundation. Archived from the original on 21 May 2014.
- "Ratna Djoewita". filmindonesia.or.id (in Indonesian). Jakarta: Konfiden Foundation. Archived from the original on 21 May 2014.
- "Soeara Berbisa". filmindonesia.or.id (in Indonesian). Jakarta: Konfiden Foundation. Archived from the original on 10 November 2013.
- "Soeara Berbisa" [Venomous Voice]. Pertjatoeran Doenia Dan Film (in Indonesian). 1 (5). Batavia: 29. October 1941.
- "Studio Nieuws" [Studio News]. Pertjatoeran Doenia Dan Film (in Indonesian). 1 (4). Batavia: 26–28. September 1941.
- "Studio Nieuws" [Studio News]. Pertjatoeran Doenia Dan Film (in Indonesian). 1 (5). Batavia: 26–28. October 1941.
- "Tirai Terbentang" [Open Curtains]. Pertjatoeran Doenia Dan Film (in Indonesian). 1 (7). Batavia: 28–29. December 1941.
- "(untitled)". De Sumatra Post (in Dutch). Medan. 4 November 1941. p. 8.
- "(untitled)". Soerabaijasch Handelsblad (in Dutch). Surabaya. 15 January 1942. p. 7.
- "(untitled)". Pelita Rakjat (in Indonesian). Surabaya. 9 February 1949. p. 2. Archived from the original on 17 May 2014.
