= M.H. Laddé =

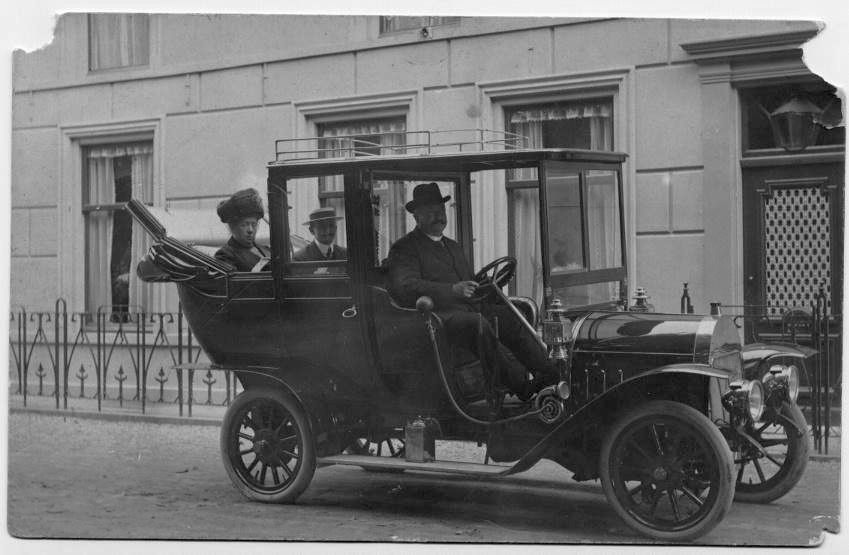
M.H. Laddé at the wheel of his Willys-Knight in front of his house in Nigtevecht

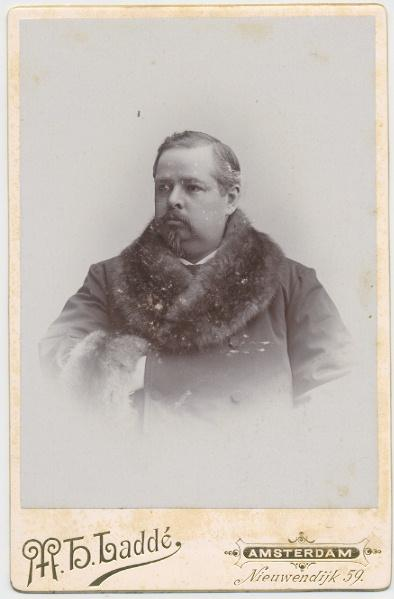
Photograph by M.H. Laddé of J.W. Merkelbach

M.H. (Machiel Hendricus) Laddé (5 November 1866 – 18 February 1932) was a Dutch photographer and film director. He was the director of the first Dutch fictional film, the 1896 comedy Gestoorde hengelaar (English: Disturbed Angler).

Between 1896 and c.1906 Laddé made several short silent movies for the studio Eerst Nederlandsch Atelier tot het vervaardigen van Films voor de Bioscoop en Cinematograaf M.H. Laddé & J.W. Merkelbach. These were shown by the traveling cinema of Christiaan Slieker (1861-1945).

None of Laddé's films have been preserved.

Laddé also was a well-known photographer with his own studio in Buiksloot (now part of Amsterdam) and was the son-in-law of the photographer J.W. Merkelbach (Johannes Wilhelm, known as Wim) (1873-1922) who was his business partner.

== Filmography ==
- Gestoorde hengelaar (1896)
- Spelende kinderen (1896)
- Zwemplaats voor Jongelingen te Amsterdam (1896)
- Solser en Hesse (1900)

== See also ==
- Dutch films before 1910
